= Brendan Dassey =

American convicted of murder, subject of "Making a Murderer"

- Born: Brendan Ray Dassey; October 19, 1989 (age 37); Manitowoc County, Wisconsin, U.S.
- Relatives: Peter Dassey (father), Barb Tadych (mother), Steven Avery (uncle)
- Status: Incarcerated at Oshkosh Correctional Institution
- Convictions: First-degree intentional homicide; Second-degree sexual assault; Mutilation of a corpse
- Penalty: Life in prison with the possibility of parole in 2048

Brendan Ray Dassey (born October 19, 1989) is an American prisoner from Manitowoc County, Wisconsin, who was convicted of being a party to first-degree murder, mutilation of a corpse, and second-degree sexual assault. He was sentenced to life in prison with the earliest possibility of parole in 2048. A videotaped interrogation and confession when he was 16, which he recanted, was central to his trial. Parts were shown in the Netflix documentary series Making a Murderer (2015). The series examined the 2005–2007 investigation, pretrial publicity, and trials of Dassey and his uncle, Steven Avery, who was convicted of murdering the photographer Teresa Halbach on October 31, 2005. No forensic trace of Dassey was found at any alleged crime scene.

After his conviction, Dassey's case was taken by the Center on Wrongful Convictions of Youth. In August 2016, a federal magistrate judge ruled that Dassey's confession had been coerced and overturned his conviction and ordered him released, which was delayed during appeal. In June 2017, a small panel of the United States Court of Appeals for the Seventh Circuit affirmed the magistrate judge's order overturning Dassey's conviction. In December 2017, the full en banc Seventh Circuit upheld Dassey's conviction by a vote of 4–3, with the majority finding that the police had properly obtained Dassey's confession.

== Early life ==
Brendan Ray Dassey was born in 1989 to Barbara (nee' Avery) and Peter Dassey in Manitowoc County, Wisconsin. He lived with his three older brothers (Blaine, Bryan and Bobby), and an older half-brother (Brad) on his father's side. After his parents divorced when he was two, his father married Lori Mathieson, and they lived nearby. His mother married Tom Janda, who moved in until they separated in 2005 pending divorce. His mother started dating Scott Tadych, who she subsequently married.

Dassey lived in a trailer by Avery Auto Salvage in the town of Gibson, within the mailing area of Two Rivers. His grandparents, Allan and Dolores Avery, also lived in a trailer there, as well as uncles. The family often spent weekends at their cabins near Crivitz, Marinette County.

Dassey attended Mishicot High School, traveling on the school bus with his brother Blaine.

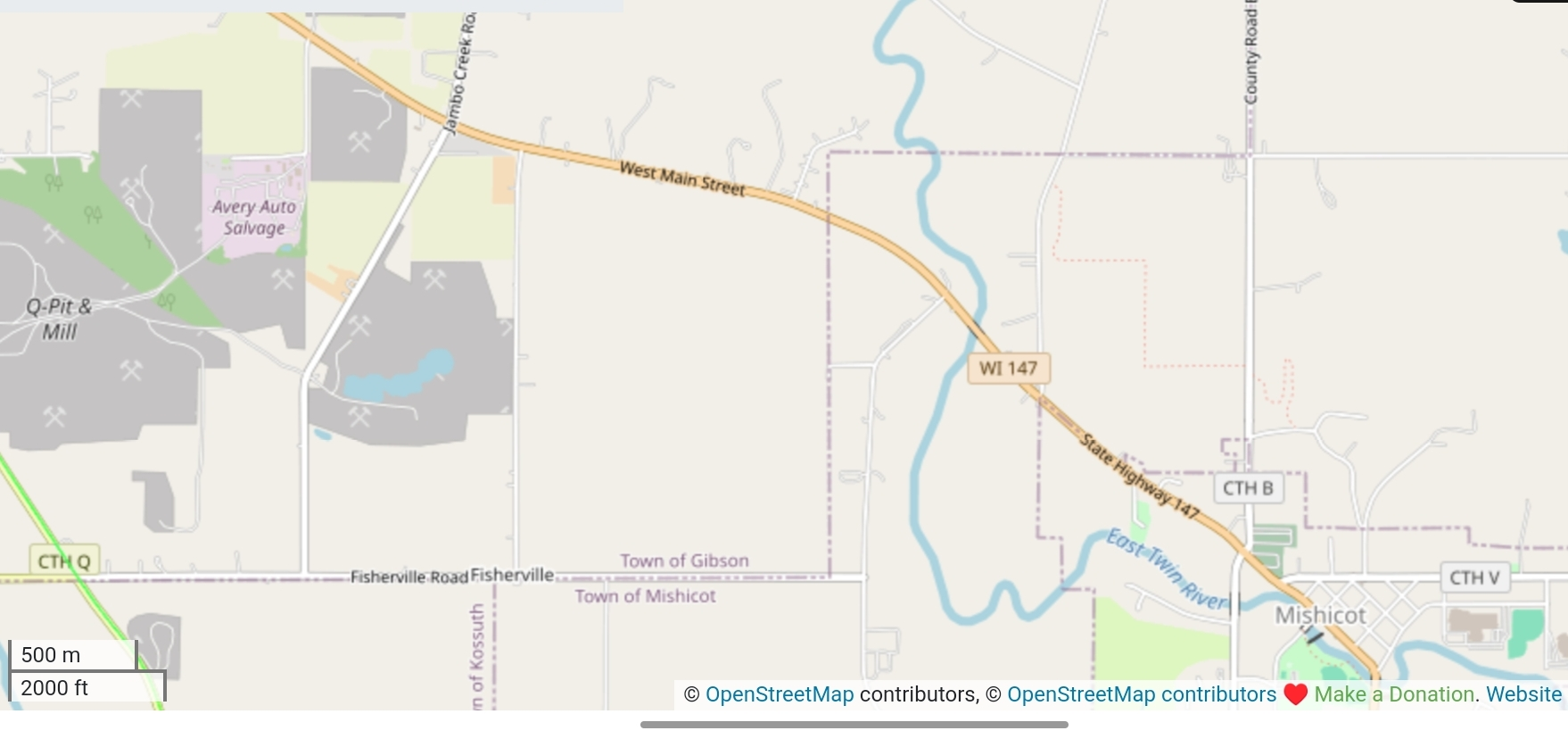
Avery Salvage and Mishicot Village

Dassey was quiet and polite to teachers. Dassey was enrolled in special education classes as well as some regular classes due to federal regulations. He was failing three courses. On school tests, his overall IQ classification would be either "borderline deficiency" or "low average". On subtests, he was sometimes average in math and thinking, but his verbal IQ was in the very lowest category.

Dassey could read and speak intelligibly in sentences, a developmental milestone achieved between the ages of four and six. However, when Dassey was nearly sixteen, he was tested for range of language fundamentals, which included receptive and expressive language, verbal memory and social context – the results indicated that he performed at level of an average six to twelve year old. The school psychologist observed that he willingly engaged in speech and language therapy, and generally had minimal eye contact, gestures and vocal range. His school records show that he had a profound language-based learning disability.

His uncle Steven Avery, who had been in prison since before Brendan was born, was exonerated of a violent rape and released in September 2003, eventually moving into a trailer next door. There was a lot of media coverage and public support, but no parole officer, though several years of his sentence had also been for a violent crime he committed. Having received minimal financial compensation, Avery was pursuing a multimillion dollar civil lawsuit against the Sheriffs and District Attorney. He also sought the passage of an "Avery Bill" to regulate police handling of eyewitnesses and custodial interrogations.

== Murder of Teresa Halbach ==
Photographer Teresa Halbach, 25, from St John in neighboring Calumet County, was reported missing by her parents on November 3, 2005. Halbach was known to have visited the Avery property in Manitowoc County on Monday, October 31, the day she worked for Auto Trader. Steven Avery had called Auto Trader in the morning requesting the same lady again, and Halbach had arrived around 2:35pm to photograph a red minivan parked outside. Avery kept a copy of the magazine that she would hand out at appointments. Bobby Dassey, who was also home alone, said he saw her from his window before he left. The last time Halbach's cell phone showed as active with Cingular was around 2:42pm, when an incoming call went to voicemail.

On November 5, 2005, Halbach's Toyota RAV4 vehicle was discovered partially concealed on the Avery Salvage Yard. Calumet County Sheriffs obtained search warrants and, on November 7 and 8, Manitowoc County Sheriffs and others retrieved her charred electronics (cell phone, camera and personal digital assistant), license plates, car key and some burned bone fragments and clothing rivets. Some of the fragments were visually determined to be human on November 9 and 10, and one gave a partial DNA profile matching Halbach. Blood found in the RAV4 was matched to both Halbach and Avery. Avery had a cut on his right hand, which he said happened at Crivitz the day before Halbach's visit while handling sheet metal.

On November 15, Avery was charged with the murder of Halbach and with mutilating the corpse. He had already been under arrest since November 9, for illegally keeping two guns in his trailer. Shell casings had been found on his garage floor on November 6, but guns were fired regularly on the Avery property. In addition, novelty restraints had been found in Avery's trailer, and the media reported that the police suspected he planned to commit violent or sexual torture, though there was no forensic evidence.

Out of respect for the Halbach family, the Avery Bill, which had passed both houses of the legislature on November 1 but would not be signed into law until the end of the year, was renamed the Criminal Justice Reforms Bill.

== Interrogations ==
=== November 2005 ===
Brendan Dassey was in school in Mishicot when Halbach arrived at the Avery property. He arrived home around 3:40pm as usual, with his brother Blaine, and according to them he played on their PlayStation. Family members came and went throughout the evening.

Dassey was interviewed on Sunday, November 6, by Marinette County Sheriffs Deputies O'Neill and (Todd) Baldwin, in their squad car. Dassey mentioned in passing that the family had talked about having a bonfire for schoolkids on Thursday, November 3, but it was cancelled. After 20 minutes the officers became confrontational and suggested, based on information they believed at the time, that he should have seen Halbach when he arrived on the school bus on Monday, October 31. Dassey then talked about seeing her. Apart from that, when asked about the evening, he said Avery came by to get help to push a broken vehicle (Suzuki Samurai) into his detached garage. Avery, in a recorded jail call from his fiance around 9pm that day while outside, said he had brought Brendan over to help.

Dassey was interrogated again on November 10, about a bonfire alleged by Bobby Dassey to have occurred at Avery's on November 2 or 1, which Dassey then talked about attending on November 1 or 2. These were crucial contributors to Dassey's later interrogations. Avery did not state any memory of Dassey being over that evening in any of his early interviews, but later when he started agreeing he had a fire on October 31, he said Dassey was with him.

=== February–March 2006 ===
On February 27, DoJ DCI special agent Fassbender and Calumet Sheriff Deputy Wiegert went to Dassey's school and told him he was at a bonfire on October 31 (reportedly based on an unnamed witness), and they believed Halbach was burned there, so he would have seen body parts. After going through several stages of the adult Reid method of interrogation, including legalistic threats and promises, Dassey talked about seeing body parts in a fire on October 31. Bloody clothes were also suggested and talked about, explained as the result of an unwitnessed stabbing by Avery.

Dassey was taken with his mother to the police station, where he repeated such answers on video. They were then taken to a motel and, that night, interrogated about old bleach stains on Dassey's jeans, which was not recorded. The next day Dassey returned to school and home.

The following morning, March 1, he was taken from his school to the police station. A central issue was interrogators asking what Avery did to Halbach's head, because they knew a report had concluded that a skull fragment showed bullet marks. But after Dassey gave different answers, such as cut her hair, they told Dassey she was shot by asking who shot her in the head. Dassey replied that Avery shot her outside, then changed the location to the garage after prompting. There had been discussion about Halbach being dressed or not, and something else they said they knew was done to her, to which Dassey had replied that Avery said he raped her. Dassey said he didn't know where, but after being prompted about knowing she was alive, he recounted hearing screaming and going into Avery's trailer as he raped her, having a soda, and participating in rape. After being told he was there when she was killed, he said they stabbed her and Avery strangled her to death. The interrogators also introduced the idea that Avery raised the hood of her vehicle and for a reason to do with the engine.

Investigators could now obtain further search warrants, and reported finding two bullet fragments in Avery's garage, in addition to casings which were also found back in 2005. Although they jackhammered the concrete floor looking for blood, no trace of Halbach or Dassey was ever found there or in Avery's trailer. But the crime lab would find Halbach's DNA on one of the bullet fragments, in an uncommon test which could not be repeated despite a contaminated control sample.

=== Arrest and Press ===
Overall, Dassey was interrogated on four occasions over a 48-hour period, including three times in a 24-hour time frame. He had no counsel or parent present, although Dassey and his mother consented to the interrogations, in which investigators made false promises to Dassey using approved interrogation techniques. He was interrogated via the Reid technique, which was developed to permit and encourage law enforcement officers to use tactics that pressure suspects to confess, whether true or false. Dassey had several of the traits which can make false confessions more likely. In the two interrogations at the police station, the officers asked 1,525 questions, 98% of them a type which contained and suggested content relating to the case.

Dassey was arrested and charged with being party to a first-degree homicide, sexual assault, and mutilation of a corpse. As a result, extra charges of kidnapping, false imprisonment and sexual assault were brought against Avery, though they would all be dismissed by the trial judge at the request of prosecutors, likely due to lack of forensic evidence. The special prosecutor Ken Kratz held a major live press conference about the two cases, alongside Calumet Sheriff Pagel, discussing the charges against Dassey and Avery, and reading verbatim elements of Dassey's confession. Kratz was trying to counter the public accusations against the police. It was widely covered by TV and newspapers, and changed the public perception of Avery.

As a result, a trainee school counselor from Mishicot High School contacted investigators to say Kayla Avery had previously expressed concern that Avery had asked a cousin how to move a body - but the counselor didn't know which cousin (Bobby Dassey reported that Avery made such a joke in reply to Osmunson). Detectives therefore interrogated Kayla Avery again, who now said Brendan had told her several different incriminating things. She would later retract all those responses.

Dassey's first appointed lawyer, Ralph Sczygelski, left the case due to being on the Halbach family tree, after waiving a right to a preliminary hearing, which Dassey would never have. On March 10, when he first spoke with his new state-appointed attorney, Len Kachinsky, Dassey said his confessions under interrogation were false, and asked to take a lie detector test.

=== April–May 2006 ===
After Dassey repeated the request on April 3, Kachinsky found Michael O'Kelly on the internet, who administered the unreliable polygraph to Dassey on April 16. Kachinsky, who wanted Dassey to cooperate with the prosecution of Steven Avery, then agreed that O'Kelly would interrogate Dassey alone on May 12. O'Kelly told Dassey the polygraph showed deception and so he would go to prison for life if he did not say sorry and help. Dassey confessed for O'Kelly, while also telling him his confessions had been false because of what the police were telling him.

On May 13, under O'Kelly's supervision, Dassey was interrogated again by the police, where the confession developed into a planned murder. It now took place in Avery's garage, rather than her first being killed in the trailer, where no forensic trace had been found. After the officers warned him to also tell his mother, he then confessed to his mother by phone, partially, while referring to O'Kelly's test result and warning. Later evaluation of the polygraph data by expert Charles Honts reportedly concluded it did not indicate deception.

In June 2006, Dassey recanted in writing to the trial judge, except for keeping the suggestion that he attended a bonfire on October 31, 2005. Kachinsky told the media he believed the letter was influenced by Dassey's family. In August 2006, the Wisconsin public defenders office decertified Kachinsky from serious cases, because he had allowed Dassey to be interrogated by police on May 13 without a lawyer, and the judge then removed him from the Dassey case.

== Trial ==
Kachinsky was replaced by public defender Mark Fremgen. He had declined but then agreed on condition that expert fees were paid to hire lawyer colleague Ray Edelstein, who dealt with the interrogation tapes. Fremgen dealt with the forensics, the client and their psychologist Robert H. Gordon. He did not hire a psychology expert who could testify on specific police interrogation methods, such as Richard Leo or Lawrence T. White. Edelstein mentioned Dassey's language impairments but he did not specifically connect them to the interrogations.

In March 2007, Steven Avery was convicted of murdering Halbach. He did not testify, and the prosecution did not say that anyone else was involved. The forensic anthropologist, Leslie Eisenberg, said she had visually determined some of the bone fragments from a "Janda barrel" to be human, but the prosecution case was that Avery put them there. Dassey was barely mentioned, although during jury selection it was apparent the jurors were aware of the Dassey story from press conferences. The forensic lab confirmed that they had a sample of DNA of Brendan Dassey, but that no trace of him was ever found. The school bus driver, Lisa Buchner, testified that she took Brendan and his brother Blaine to school in the morning and dropped them back at Avery Road between 3.30pm and 3.40pm as usual. She had a recollection (originally volunteered to police on November 5, 2005) of seeing a lady photographing a junk vehicle nearby, but accepted she wasn't sure which day or week.

The Dassey trial began on April 16, 2007, with a sequestered jury from Dane County, Wisconsin. The central evidence was the March 1 interrogation, which was played to the jury. The defense sought to introduce the interrogation at his school on February 27, 2006, and on May 13, 2006, but Judge Fox ruled them inadmissible hearsay. He allowed the subsequent phonecall with his mother on May 13, however, which was used by the prosecution. There was press speculation that the jury would remember it the most, because in that moment his mother responded as if his statements were true, regarding events prior to her arriving home around 5pm.

Contrary to his own defense that held the police interrogators responsible along with his own suggestibility, Dassey testified that he did not know why he said what he did. Or that he could have got some from books, mentioning Kiss the Girls. His lawyers were surprised and Edelstein rushed to a store to find a copy, although a day or two prior Dassey had started saying to them maybe he got the ideas from books or dreams. Dassey was on the stand for about 100 minutes. He was cross-examined by state special prosecutor Tom Fallon, while Ken Kratz dealt with the defense psychologist.

The prosecution did not make a case that any forensic evidence of Dassey was found at any alleged crime scene or item. They argued that some of his statements in 2006 and at trial were truly from him and thus linked him to some evidence found in 2006, such as the DNA of Avery on the RAV4 hood latch, the DNA of Halbach on a bullet, and bleach stains on his jeans.

In closing argument, Edelstein, to the surprise of Fremgen and without consulting Dassey, offered to the jury that Dassey had seen Halbach in a fire, even though Dassey had testified he had not. Fallon, the lead prosecutor, stated to the jury that innocent people don't confess in such detail, then just "innocent people don't confess".

The trial lasted nine days, with a verdict delivered on April 25, 2007. The jury deliberated for four hours before finding Dassey guilty of being a party to first-degree intentional homicide, second-degree sexual assault, and mutilation of a corpse. Dassey maintained his innocence to the families in court and afterwards, referring to the interrogators wanting particular answers.

On May 5, 2007, the Wisconsin Criminal Justice Study Commission, a group set up in 2005 to deal with issues beyond the Avery Task Force, published its position paper on the causes and prevention of false confessions.

On August 2, 2007, Dassey was sentenced to life in prison with eligibility for parole in 2048. The Halbach family had requested life without parole, on the basis he had not apologized or shown remorse. The judge cited Dassey's young age, no prior criminal record, and lesser role than Avery. Dassey would be incarcerated at the maximum security Columbia Correctional Institution. Two years later he was moved to the maximum security Green Bay Correctional Institution. In 2016 he was moved back to Columbia Correctional Institution.

On June 6, 2007, prior to the sentencing of Avery to life without parole, Judge Willis wrote that the Dassey case would not influence his decision. He referred to expert doubts about the interrogations and Dassey, and a lack of forensic evidence.

== Public response and appeals ==
=== Postconviction hearings ===
Dassey's case was taken up in 2008 by confession expert Professor Steven Drizin, from the Northwestern University Pritzker School of Law in Chicago, who thought his wrongful convictions clinic could help and it would be good for his students to work on. He assigned it to a third-year law student Laura Nirider, who gradually became the lead attorney. Experienced trial lawyer Thomas Geraghty also represented Dassey at times. Robert Dvorak, a local Milwaukee lawyer working with them, uncovered O'Kelly's interrogation of Dassey. In August 2009, they entered a motion for retrial. In October, Drizin co-founded the Center on Wrongful Convictions of Youth within the law school's Bluhm legal clinic, which took on Dassey's case. The televised postconviction hearing took place over several days in January 2010. The motion was denied in December by Judge Fox. The denial was affirmed by the Wisconsin Court of Appeals in January 2013, and the Wisconsin Supreme Court declined to review.

=== Making a Murderer ===
The release of Making a Murderer in December 2015 generated a wide, international audience and was met with significant media attention. The Halbach family criticized it as trying to entertain for profit, from the Averys' perspective, while they remembered Teresa. Former juror Robert Covington said he had questioned Dassey's competency on the stand and thought there should be a retrial.

The Netflix series, which chronicles the trials of Avery and Dassey, generated global dialogue centered around wrongful convictions, coerced confessions, interrogation of minors, and criminal justice reform. There were petitions for Dassey's freedom and the implementation of the "Juvenile Interrogation Protection Law in Wisconsin", which would prohibit police from questioning minors without a lawyer present. Petitions were also submitted for the investigation of the police officers who interrogated Dassey. Rallies in support of Dassey and Avery were held in the United States, UK and Australia. Prominent legal analyst Dan Abrams pointed out that much of the country was divided over whether “they” did it, ignoring the likelihood that Dassey is innocent regardless of Avery's guilt. Director Peter Jackson and others compared the interrogations of Dassey to those of Jessie Miskelly. By July 2016, Making a Murderer 2 was in production, focusing on the post-conviction process for Dassey and his family. It would broadcast in October 2018 to mixed reviews.

=== District Court ===
In December 2015, Dassey's attorneys filed a writ of habeas corpus (unlawful detention) in federal district court for release or retrial, citing constitutional rights violations due to ineffective assistance of counsel and a coerced confession.

In August 2016, William E. Duffin, magistrate judge for the Eastern district of Wisconsin, ruled that Dassey's confession had been coerced, and was therefore involuntary and unconstitutional, and ordered him released or retried. Legal analysts suggested the state would not want a retrial, due to lack of independent evidence and to the solid alibi Dassey had until at least 5.20pm. A former teacher of Halbach said she did not think Dassey should be released, saying the interrogators just asked him questions.

=== US 7th Circuit Court ===
In November 2016, the Wisconsin Justice Department appealed Duffin's decision to the United States Court of Appeals for the Seventh Circuit (a region covering Wisconsin), which blocked Dassey's release pending a hearing.

In June 2017, after a hearing in February, a three-judge panel of the Seventh Circuit upheld the decision to overturn Dassey's conviction. Judge Ilana Rovner, joined by Judge Ann Claire Williams, affirmed, over the dissent of Judge David Hamilton.

However, on July 5, 2017, the Wisconsin Department of Justice submitted a petition requesting a rehearing en banc (all available 7th Circuit judges). In August, the Seventh Circuit Court of Appeals granted the request for September 26. Judge Richard Posner unexpectedly resigned earlier that month. In the hearing on September 26, the confession was viewed through the lens of the restrictive Antiterrorism and Effective Death Penalty Act of 1996.

On December 8, 2017, the en banc Seventh Circuit upheld Dassey's conviction by a vote of 4–3, with the majority finding that the police had properly obtained Dassey's confession. Judge Hamilton's majority opinion was joined by Judges Frank H. Easterbrook, Michael Stephen Kanne, and Diane S. Sykes. Then-Chief Judge Diane Wood and Judge Rovner both wrote dissents, joined by Judge Williams.

=== US Supreme Court ===
On February 20, 2018, Dassey's legal team, including former U.S. Solicitor General Seth P. Waxman, filed a petition for a writ of certiorari (review) to the United States Supreme Court. The court had not addressed the issue of juvenile false confessions for nearly 40 years, and on June 25, 2018, certiorari was denied without comment. Any further options for Dassey were said to be extremely unlikely, unless new evidence were uncovered such as by Avery's lawyer Kathleen Zellner.

=== Continued imprisonment ===
In April 2019, Dassey was moved to the medium security prison Oshkosh Correctional Institution. In December, Wisconsin Governor Evers stated he is not exercising the power to commute sentences, and is only considering pardons after a sentence is served.

Zellner continued to file appeals for Avery, which were not successful. In 2024, she objected that the Manitowoc County Circuit Court had relied on Dassey's statements which were not part of Avery's trial, and had referred to Dassey being directly forensically linked to the crime. The Attorneys General, on behalf of the state of Wisconsin, argued in response that Brendan was convicted of the crime regardless of not being “forensically linked” to it.
