= Thomas J. Fallon =

American lawyer

Thomas J. Fallon is a lawyer who works in the criminal litigation department of the Attorney General in Wisconsin, USA. He is also the state's first Child Abuse "Resource Prosecutor", a post recently created by former AG Brad Schimel. Fallon has authored books and presentations on prosecutor ethics, interrogations, sexually violent person proceedings and child abuse. He has written a guide on how to prepare children as prosecution witnesses in court. He has also written "The Basic Do's and Dont's of Interviewing"; "The Miranda Primer-Revised, a training manual for prosecutors and law enforcement officers on Wisconsin Interrogation Law"; and the "Safe Schools Legal Resource Manual". He was a national advisor on shaken baby syndrome.

Fallon began his career in the Kenosha County child support agency and District Attorney's office. He became an assistant DA with the Wisconsin Department of Justice, specializing in sex crimes. He then moved to the Dane County DA' s office. In 2016, Fallon returned to the state DoJ.

In 2007, Fallon was a special prosecutor alongside Ken Kratz in the trials of Steven Avery and schoolboy Brendan Dassey, which were made internationally known by the Netflix series Making a Murderer in 2015. Fallon was the lead prosecutor at Dassey's trial, telling the jury in closing that innocent people don't confess. Fallon conducted the examination of the forensic anthropologist Leslie Eisenberg and, at Avery's trial, Scott Fairgrieve. Fallon has been a frequent name in Avery's subsequent legal appeals, especially concerning burned bone fragments. Fallon previously worked on the report which cleared the state of criminal wrongdoing in Avery's prior wrongful conviction for a violent rape.

In 2014, Fallon was one of two prosecutors accused by a coroner, Dr Michael Stier, of having pressured him into withholding his expert opinion in 2007 that a skull irregularity was not from a fracture. The accused, state-registered day care provider Jennifer Hancock, was found guilty and served 13 years.
