= Center on Wrongful Convictions of Youth =

- Formation: 2009; 17 years ago
- Founder: Clinical Professor of Law Steven Drizin
- Founded at: Northwestern University Pritzker School of Law's Bluhm Legal Clinic
- Type: Legal clinic
- Purpose: The Center on Wrongful Convictions of Youth represents children and adolescents thought to be wrongly convicted
- Headquarters: 375 East Chicago Avenue, Chicago, IL 60611-3069
- Region served: United States
- Director and Clinical Assistant Professor of Law: Laura Nirider
- Website: www.cwcy.org

The Center on Wrongful Convictions youth clinic, part of the Center on Wrongful Convictions within Northwestern University Pritzker School of Law's Bluhm Legal Clinic, is a non-profit legal clinic that represents children thought to have been convicted of crimes they did not commit. Co-founded by Northwestern Law Professor Steven Drizin and directed by Professor Laura Nirider, it was the first organization in the world to focus exclusively on wrongfully convicted children. Through its research, scholarship, teaching, and advocacy, the Center has developed expertise in the problem of false confessions, police interrogation practices, and constitutional doctrine governing the interrogation room.

In collaboration with partners across the United States, the clinic is active in federal and state appellate, post-conviction, and habeas corpus proceedings. Its faculty and students not only represent individuals but also submit amicus curiae (friend-of-the-court) briefs before courts around the globe, including the United States Supreme Court, which cited the Center as an authority on juvenile false confessions in the 2011 case J.D.B. v. North Carolina. The Center's faculty have been particularly active in public outreach and professional education, speaking about interrogations and confessions before audiences that range from legal stakeholders like judges, attorneys, police, and law professors to the general public at events hosted by institutions of higher education, religious organizations, and corporate sponsors. Its faculty have also been quoted widely in media reports and academic articles addressing wrongful convictions, interrogations, and confessions.

== History ==
Launched at Northwestern Pritzker School of Law in October 2009, the Center on Wrongful Convictions of Youth was a joint initiative between Northwestern Law's Center for Wrongful Convictions and its Children and Family Justice Center, with a defined purpose of representing and advocating for accused or convicted youth. It was a grants-based project that developed from a symposium. The stated goal was that only reliable evidence be used in prosecuting and convicting youth. The coordinator was Joshua Tepfer, a staff attorney along with Nirider.

Co-founded by the then-legal director of the Center on Wrongful Convictions, scholar and advocate Professor Steven Drizin, the CWCY was spearheaded by Drizin. A student in Drizin's third year law class, Laura Nirider, became the director. From 2016 to 2018, Nirider was funded by the Bureau of Justice Assistance. A group of Northwestern Law students worked alongside CWCY faculty and pro bono attorneys in an environment said to be rigorously intellectual.

In addition to its high-profile representation of Making a Murderer subject Brendan Dassey, who is still in prison, and West Memphis Three member Damien Echols, who is free but still convicted via Alford Plea, the CWCY stated it played a central role in more than 20 cases that resulted in exoneration through the post-conviction and habeas process. In 2011, CWCY faculty and students used DNA evidence to help exonerate two groups of wrongfully convicted Chicago-area teenagers in widely followed twin murder cases known as the Dixmoor Five and Englewood Four. Both cases involved multiple false confessions from teens. Those cases were nationally noted because in each case, groups of children were convicted of rape-murder charges—despite DNA evidence excluding all of them at the time of trial—on the basis of false confessions. In 2017, the Center helped, with law firm Kirkland & Ellis, exonerate Charles Johnson and the Marquette Park Four. That same year they had a cocktail event with the lawyers who represented Steven Avery when he was convicted of murder.

Some time after 2018, the clinic was merged into its sister clinic the Center for Wrongful Convictions.

=== Film ===
- Making a Murderer Seasons 1 & 2, Emmy-winning Netflix Global series addressing the case of Brendan Dassey
- West of Memphis BAFTA-nominated documentary about the West Memphis Three.
- Dateline NBC, "The Interrogation," featuring Laura Nirider as an interrogation expert in the case of Virginia teenager Robert Davis.
- A True Story of a False Confession: The Brendan Dassey Case a discussion on Brendan Dasseys case, police interrogations, and false confessions. Livestream from Northwestern Pritzker School of Law.

=== Podcasts ===
- Concord Law School: Discussion between Professor Steven Drizin and Martin Pritkin (Dean of Concord Law School) concerning the wrongful conviction of juveniles.
- Undisclosed: with Rabia Chaudry and Professors Drizin and Nirider. Discussion on Dassey v Dittman before the United States Supreme Court
- Scalar Learning Podcast: Huzefa interviews Professor Steve Drizin.
- Planet Lex Podcast: Professors Drizin and Nirider interviewed on defending Brendan Dassey of Making a Murderer.

== See also ==
- List of wrongful convictions in the United States
- Juvenile Law Center
- Centurion Ministries
- Innocence Project
- Saul Kassin
- International Association of Chiefs of Police
- Martin Tankleff
- Jeffrey Mark Deskovic
- Miscarriage of Justice
