= Debra Tolchinsky =

American film director

- Education: Art Institute of Chicago
- Occupations: Filmmaker, Associate Professor
- Website: www.crossxproductions.com

Debra Tolchinsky is a filmmaker, an associate chair and associate professor of radio, TV, and film at Northwestern University, and founding director of Northwestern University's MFA program in documentary media. Tolchinsky is most known for her true-crime documentary short published by The New York Times that explores the story of Penny Beerntsen and Steven Avery, which is at the center of Netflix's series Making A Murderer.

== Early life and education ==
Tolchinsky grew up in Los Angeles, California. She earned a BA and MFA at the Art Institute of Chicago.

== Career ==
Tolchinsky is the founding director of Northwestern University’s MFA program in documentary media and is the associate chair and associate professor of radio, TV, and film. She co-founded the Chicago chapter of Film Fatales, an organization that supports women directors based in Chicago. She has shown her films at the Sundance Film Festival, the John F. Kennedy Center, the Gene Siskel Film Center, and the Supreme Court Institute.

== Films ==
Year	Title	Role
1988	Saint Catherine's Wedding Ring	co-producer, director
2002	Lucky	producer, director
2002	Dolly	producer, director
2011	Fast Talk	producer, director, cinematographer
2019	Contaminated Memories	producer, director

=== Contaminated Memories ===
Tolchinsky's most widely-known work is true-crime documentary Contaminated Memories, published by The New York Times. The 13-minute film follows Penny Beerntsen, who returns to where her assault took place and recounts the attack that led her to mistakenly identify Steven Avery as the perpetrator. Beerntsen and Avery's story is documented in Netflix's series Making A Murderer. Tolchinsky worked closely with Beerntsen in the making of the film to share her story. The film primarily explores memory contamination, or the ability for a memory to be corrupted by external factors so that facts are difficult to parse out. The film cites cognitive scientists like Elizabeth Loftus.

== Awards ==
Tolchinsky's film, Fast Talk, which she directed and produced, won Best Documentary at the LA Femme International Film Festival and Best Documentary Feature at the Chagrin Documentary Film Festival.
