= Ken Kratz =

American lawyer

Calumet County District Attorney
- In office May 1992 – October 2010
- Succeeded by: Jerilyn Dietz

Personal details
- Born: Kenneth R. Kratz; 1960 or 1961 (age 65–66) Milwaukee, Wisconsin, U.S.
- Party: Republican
- Spouse: Leah Kratz (m. 2017)
- Education: University of Wisconsin–Whitewater (BA); Marquette University (JD)
- Occupation: Attorney

Kenneth "Ken" R. Kratz (born 1960/61) is a former American lawyer who served as district attorney of Calumet County, Wisconsin. He gained attention for trying a highly publicized homicide case, State of Wisconsin v. Steven Avery (2007), in which Avery and his nephew Brendan Dassey were both convicted. The trial served as the subject of Making a Murderer (2015), a 10-episode documentary series produced by Netflix.

Kratz resigned from his office in October 2010 after a sexting scandal; he had sent sexual texts to a 26-year-old domestic violence victim whose ex-boyfriend he was prosecuting. Several other women whom he met as district attorney also complained to authorities that he had approached them with inappropriate sexual behavior including inviting a woman to a date to an autopsy of a murdered woman. As a result, in 2014, Kratz's law license was suspended for four months by the Wisconsin Supreme Court. In 2013, he settled a civil suit by the first woman who had brought the complaint against him.

== Early life and education ==
Kratz is a native of Milwaukee, Wisconsin. He later lived in Onalaska, Wisconsin. After graduating from the University of Wisconsin–Whitewater in 1983 and Marquette Law School in 1985, Kratz was admitted to the bar and licensed to practice law in Wisconsin in 1985.

== Career ==
He worked in the La Crosse, Wisconsin City Attorney's Office as an assistant city attorney from 1985 to 1987. He served as an assistant district attorney in La Crosse County, Wisconsin, from 1987 to 1992, and said his specialties were drug-related cases and child sex abuse cases.

Kratz was appointed district attorney of Calumet County (replacing Donald Poppy, who became a judge) by Wisconsin Governor Tommy Thompson in 1992; he was the only applicant for the post. He served as president of the Wisconsin District Attorneys Association in 1996. Kratz chaired the Wisconsin Victim Rights Council in 1993 as well as its successor, the Wisconsin Crime Victims Rights Board, from 1998 to 2010.

In 1997, Kratz prosecuted a prominent child abuse case in which parents allegedly locked their daughter in a cage. The mother pleaded guilty. In 2008, Kratz explored a run for the Republican nomination in Wisconsin's 6th congressional district.

=== Prosecution of 2005 murder of Teresa Halbach ===
Kratz was appointed special prosecutor and headed the investigation and prosecution of Steven Avery in neighboring Manitowoc County for the murder of Teresa Halbach on October 31, 2005. Manitowoc County had recused its officials because it was being sued by Avery for wrongful conviction, following his exoneration in 2003 of a 1985 conviction for which he had served 18 years in prison for a crime he did not commit. Kratz was also co-counsel to lead prosecutor Tom Fallon against Brendan Dassey, after conducting notorious press conferences against him and Avery.

Kratz gained convictions of both defendants in trials in 2007. Avery was sentenced to life without parole. Dassey, then 17, was sentenced to life imprisonment, with no parole before he reached the age of 56. Dassey's conviction was provisionally overturned in August 2016, subject to appellate review, which reinstated the conviction.

== 2009 sexual harassment scandal ==
=== Behavior ===
In October 2009, Kratz was prosecuting a domestic violence case against the ex-boyfriend of a 26-year-old victim, who was a college student and part-time preschool teacher. She filed a police report in Kaukauna, Wisconsin, reporting that after interviewing her in his office, Kratz had sent her 30 sexually coercive text messages over the span of three days. She said that she felt that he was trying to coerce her into a sexual relationship, fearing if she refused him he would dismiss the case against her ex-boyfriend.

Kratz wrote her, among other things, "Are you the kind of girl that likes secret contact with an older married elected DA ... the riskier the better?" And: "I would not expect you to be the other woman. I would want you to be so hot and treat me so well that you'd be THE woman! R U that good?" He wrote her as well: "I'm serious! I'm the atty. I have the $350,000 house. I have the 6-figure career. You may be the tall, young, hot nymph, but I am the prize!" Kratz did not deny sending her the text messages.

The report was referred to the state's Division of Criminal Investigation. During the DCI investigation, a dozen or so more women came forward accusing Kratz of harassing and intimidating them.

One woman complained that Kratz had invited her to a date at a slain woman's autopsy "provided I act as his girlfriend and would wear high heels and a skirt," and another woman said after meeting her in his office he texted her asking how she would impress him in bed. At the time, Kratz was serving as chairman of the Wisconsin Crime Victims' Rights Board, a quasi-judicial agency that he helped create that can reprimand judges, prosecutors, and police officers who mistreat crime victims.

Kratz had also met a woman when he prosecuted her for shoplifting in 2006. According to an investigatory report, she said that in 2009 he called her "out of the blue," said he was getting a divorce, came to her apartment, and told her in a threatening manner that he "knew everything about her" and "if she did not listen to him, he could get her 'jammed up.'" "While Kratz was at [the woman's] apartment, [he] said he ties women up, they listen to him, and he is in control. [The woman] stated that Kratz wanted her to engage in bondage with him. She said he instructed her to give him a 'blow job,' and she did." Kratz then left $75 on her kitchen counter, and subsequently called and texted her 50 or 60 times, leaving angry messages when she ignored him. Kratz also allegedly put his hand up the skirt of another domestic violence victim in 1999, when he was prosecuting her husband. In addition, the initial complainant, in a later lawsuit, charged that Kratz told another domestic abuse victim 10 years prior that "he could have a dominatrix from Chicago with whom he was familiar train the victim/witness to be more submissive to his advances."

=== Aftermath ===
Wisconsin Governor Jim Doyle said Kratz's actions "appalled" him. After Doyle began removal procedures against him, in October 2010 Kratz resigned from his $105,000 Calumet County district attorney position and later filed for Chapter 7 bankruptcy.

In March 2011, the Wisconsin Department of Justice decided that Kratz's "conduct appears to fit the connotation of 'misconduct' and demonstrates inappropriate behavior, but does not satisfy the elements required to prosecute." That same month, he opened a private practice in Kimberly, Wisconsin. He practiced as a defense attorney. He closed the practice in January 2012. After his accuser filed a federal civil suit against him, Kratz settled with her out of court in 2013, a week before trial.

In June 2014, Kratz's law license was suspended for four months by the Wisconsin Supreme Court, which termed his actions "sophomoric". The court called his actions "appalling," writing "This was exploitative behavior, harassing behavior, and a crass placement of his personal interests above those of his client, the State of Wisconsin." The court wrote further that Kratz "raised arguments that ranged from the incredible (e.g., disputing his text messages ... contained sexual overtones); to the hyper-technical ...; to the inconsistent ...; to the puzzling (arguing that he could not have told ... that a reporter had "big beautiful breasts" because the reporter in question was beautiful, but not large breasted)." During the disciplinary hearing, Kratz said he abused prescription drugs Ambien, Vicodin, and Xanax, and was being treated for sexual addiction and narcissistic personality disorder.

According to the State Bar of Wisconsin, Kratz has since voluntarily resigned his law license in the state.

== In popular culture ==
Kratz's role in the Steven Avery case was documented in the Netflix documentary series Making a Murderer (2015). Kratz did not cooperate with the producers or interviewers in the series. He later criticized them, saying they had left out key pieces of evidence. After the release of the series, Kratz began receiving death threats. His Yelp page was flooded with negative comments criticizing his tactics during the case. In 2017, he published the book Avery: The Case Against Steven Avery and What Making a Murderer Gets Wrong to rebut the allegations of the Netflix documentary.

== Personal life ==
As of 1992, Kratz was married and had one child. Kratz said he and his then-wife separated in October 2009, and that he filed for divorce in December 2009.
