= OSCI =

OSCI can refer to:

- Open SystemC Initiative, now Accellera
- Oshkosh Correctional Institution
