= Fox Lake Correctional Institution =

Medium-security Wisconsin state prison for men

Coordinates: 43°36′53″N 88°54′48″W

The Fox Lake Correctional Institution is a medium-security state prison for men located in Fox Lake, Dodge County, Wisconsin, owned and operated by the Wisconsin Department of Corrections.

In 2008, the facility had a rated capacity of 691 inmates but an actual population of 1,033.

In 2024, the facility's official capacity had increased to 979; however, the actual population had already grown to 1,365.

The facility first opened in September 1962.

== Notable inmates ==
- Steven Avery, Serving a life sentence after his 2007 conviction for the first-degree intentional homicide of Teresa Halbach, a case later widely publicized in the Netflix documentary Making a Murderer.

== See also ==
- List of Wisconsin state prisons
