= Steven Drizin =

American lawyer and academic

- Born: Philadelphia, Pennsylvania, U.S.
- Education: Haverford College (BA); Northwestern University Pritzker School of Law (JD)
- Occupations: Co-founder, Center on Wrongful Convictions of Youth; Clinical Professor of Law Emeritus, Northwestern University Pritzker School of Law; Assistant Dean, Bluhm Legal Clinic; Co-director, Northwestern Center on Wrongful Convictions
- Known for: Scholarship on police interrogations and false confessions

Steven A. Drizin is an American lawyer and academic. He is a Clinical Professor of Law Emeritus at the Northwestern University Pritzker School of Law in Chicago, where he was on the faculty from 1991. At Northwestern, Drizin taught courses on wrongful convictions and juvenile justice. He has written extensively on the topics of police interrogations and false confessions. Among the general public, Drizin is known for his ongoing representation of Brendan Dassey, one of the protagonists in the Netflix documentary series Making a Murderer.

== Early life and career ==
Drizin was born in Philadelphia, Pennsylvania. Both his parents worked as teachers in the School District of Philadelphia. In 1983, he graduated from Haverford College with a B.A. in political science. In 1986, he earned a J.D. from Northwestern University Pritzker School of Law in Chicago. At Northwestern, Drizin served as editor-in-chief for the Journal of Criminal Law and Criminology from 1985 to 1986.

Upon completing his J.D., Drizin worked for a few years in commercial litigation at the Chicago-based law firm Sachnoff & Weaver. Sachnoff & Weaver later merged with the firm Reed Smith. In 1988, Drizin left Sachnoff to clerk for Judge Ilana Rovner, who at that point in her career was on the bench at the United States District Court for the Northern District of Illinois.

He is a contributor to HuffPost. Drizin has authored law review articles, books chapters, psychological journal articles, book reviews, position papers, and essays.

== Northwestern University Bluhm Legal Clinic ==
In 1991, Drizin returned to his alma mater to become a supervising attorney at the Children and Family Justice Center at Northwestern Law's Bluhm Legal Clinic. From 2005 to 2013, he took over as Legal Director of the Clinic's Center on Wrongful Convictions. From 2013 to 2017, Drizin served as the Assistant Dean of the Bluhm Legal Clinic. In addition to teaching Northwestern law students how to represent wrongfully convicted clients in post-conviction proceedings, Drizin is a prominent criminal justice reform advocate. In 2004, Drizin co-authored an amicus brief that played a role in the United States Supreme Court's landmark decision Roper v. Simmons, which abolished the juvenile death penalty.

His policy work also involves working with state governments around the country to require law enforcement agencies to electronically record all custodial interrogations. In 2005, Drizin filed a non-party brief in the case of State vs Jerrell C.J, a Wisconsin Supreme Court case which mandated the electronic recording of all interrogations of minors in that state.

== Center on Wrongful Convictions of Youth ==
In 2008, Drizin co-founded the Center on Wrongful Convictions of Youth (CWCY), the nation's first innocence project dedicated to the representation and advocacy of wrongfully convicted children and adolescents. A joint enterprise between the Center on Wrongful Convictions and the Children and Family Justice Center, the center currently represents Brendan Dassey and has successfully exonerated over 20 wrongfully convicted juveniles.

The CWCY is active in the areas of appellate litigation, juvenile policy reform, interrogation processes, and the enforcement of juvenile constitutional protections. The Center on Wrongful Convictions of Youth represents many juveniles who have falsely confessed to a crime they have not committed, and are prominent collaborators in the juvenile justice space. Drizin and co-director Laura Nirider have authored numerous amicus curiae briefs, and conducted professional training in the area of false confessions and interrogation practices for legal professionals including judges, attorneys, and the greater law enforcement community.

== Notable federal appellate cases ==
- Brendan Dassey v Michael Dittman: 201 F. Supp. 3d 963 (E.D. Wi. 2016). Federal habeas corpus decision granting relief to 16-year-old Dassey, who gave “involuntary” confession, aff’d 860 F.3d 933 (7th Cir. 2017), rehearing en banc granted and district court's grant of habeas relief reversed, 877 F.3d 297 (7th Cir. 2017).
- Montgomery v. Louisiana: 577 U.S. ___, 136 S. Ct. 718 (2016). Co-authored amicus brief on behalf of juvenile advocacy organizations arguing that Miller v. Alabama’s holding abolishing mandatory life without parole sentences is retroactive.
- J. D. B. v. North Carolina: 564 U.S. 261 (2011). Co-authored amicus brief concerning juvenile false confessions that was cited by the US Supreme Court in majority opinion.

Pre-Roper minimum ages for executions by state No capital punishment Minimum age of 18 Minimum age of 17 Minimum age of 16

- Roper v. Simmons: 543 U.S. 551 (2005). Joined the Juvenile Law Center, Amnesty International, and other organizations representing over 50 child welfare, juvenile justice, and juvenile advocacy organizations in a landmark juvenile death penalty case. The US Supreme Court determined that it was unconstitutional to impose the death penalty on juveniles under the age of 18 as a result.
- U.S. ex rel A.M. v. Butler: 2002 WL 1348605 (N.D. IIl. June 19, 2002). Federal habeas decision vacating murder conviction of 11-year-old minor. Argued and briefed before United States Seventh Circuit Court of Appeals September 2004. Conviction reversed in published opinion A.M. v. Butler, 360 F.3d 787 (7th Cir (Ill.), Mar 2, 2004).
- U.S. ex rel. Hardaway v. Young: 162 F. Supp.2d 1005 (N.D.Ill. Sep 13, 2001) (NO. 01 C 3963). Judgment reversed by Hardaway v. Young, 302 F.3d 657 (7th Cir.(Ill.) 2002). Federal habeas corpus decision concerning the involuntariness of juvenile confessions.
- Yarborough v. Alvarado: 541 U.S. 652 (2004). Co-authored amicus brief with the Juvenile Law Center in police interrogation case involving a juvenile before the US Supreme Court - the Miranda test.

== Notable state appellate cases ==
- State v. Jerrell C.J: No. 02-3423, Wisconsin Court of Appeals and Wisconsin Supreme Court (2003). Authored an amicus brief in the reversal of an armed robbery conviction of a juvenile defendant. The opinion mandated a new rule requiring that all custodial interrogations of juveniles must be electronically recorded.
- People of the State of New York v. David McCallum: Juvenile who falsely confessed at age 16 to a 1985 murder was exonerated after post-conviction proceedings in 2014 by King's County District Attorney's Office's Conviction Review Unit.
- Michigan v. Davontae Sanford: 14-year-old developmentally impaired juvenile who falsely confessed after two days of interrogation to a quadruple murder in Detroit was exonerated in 2016.
- People of the State of Illinois v. Terrill Swift, et al: 17-year-old who falsely confessed to a 1995 murder was exonerated by DNA evidence in January 2012 (Englewood Four).
- People of the State of Illinois v. Robert Taylor, et al: 14-year-old adolescent who falsely confessed to a 1991 murder exonerated by DNA evidence in November 2011, freeing Taylor and four co-defendants (Dixmoor Five).
- People of the State of Illinois v. John Horton: 17-year-old who falsely confessed to a murder in 1993 was exonerated in 2017 after serving 23 years as appellate court tosses conviction and state decides not to retry.
- People of the State of Illinois v. Justin Doyle: In 2017 Governor Bruce Rauner granted clemency to Justin Doyle who was convicted under the Illinois felony murder rule in 2008, commuting a 30-year sentence to 9 years of time-served.

== Works ==
- Warden, Rob; Drizin, Steven A., eds. (2009). True Stories of False Confessions. Northwestern University Press.
- Drizin, Steven A.; Leo, Richard A. (2008). "The Problem of False Confessions in the Post-DNA Age". Translated into Japanese by Kazuko Ito and published as a book (Tokyo: Japan UNI Agency, 2008) and amicus brief which was filed by the Center on Wrongful Convictions before the Supreme Court of Japan.

== Recognition ==
- The Arc of the United States Perske Award (2018)
- Pritzker School of Law Dawn Clark Netsch Public Service Award (2017)
- Campaign for Fair Sentencing of Youth Healing and Hope Award (2016)
- Congressional Black Caucus Veterans Braintrust Award (2016)
- American Bar Association Livingston Hall Award (2005)
- National Juvenile Defender Center Juvenile Defender Leadership Award (2000)

== Film appearances ==
- Making a Murderer: seasons 1 & 2, Netflix series about the case of Brendan Dassey.
- West of Memphis: documentary about the West Memphis Three.
- Brendan Dassey: A True Story of A False Confession: discussion on the case of Brendan Dassey, livestreamed from the Pritzker School of Law.
- David & Me: documentary on the wrongful conviction of David McCallum, exonerated after 29 years in prison.
- The Injustice System in America: documentary on Jason Strong, exonerated after 15 years in prison.

== Podcast appearances ==
- Concord Law School: discussion between Drizin and Martin Pritkin (dean of Concord Law School) concerning the wrongful conviction of juveniles.
- Undisclosed: discussion between Rabia Chaudry, Drizin, and Laura Nirider on Dassey v Dittman before the United States Supreme Court.
- Scalar Learning Podcast: Huzefa Kapadia interviews Drizin.
- Planet Lex Podcast: Drizin and Nirider interviewed by Dan Rodriguez on defending Brendan Dassey.
- Tunnel Vision Podcast: discussion between Drizin and Avery Tatro about the false confession of KC Grondin.

== See also ==
- List of wrongful convictions in the United States
- Juvenile Law Center
- Arc of the United States
- Innocence Project
- Saul Kassin
- Rob Warden
- West Memphis Three
- False confession
- American juvenile justice system
- Miscarriage of justice
- Making a Murderer
