= Laura Nirider =

American attorney and legal scholar

Laura Nirider (née Hepokoski, born October 16, 1981) is an American attorney and legal scholar working as an associate professor of law and the co-director of the Center on Wrongful Convictions at Northwestern University Pritzker School of Law. An expert on law relating to false confessions, Nirider specializes in representing young people who confessed to crimes that it is thought they did not commit, and working to reform the process of police interrogation. Nirider's work gained international visibility following her involvement in several high-profile cases involving juvenile confessions. Her clients have included Brendan Dassey, whose case was profiled on the Netflix documentary Making a Murderer, and who is still in prison, and Damien Echols of the West Memphis Three, whose case was profiled on the HBO series Paradise Lost and the documentary West of Memphis, who was freed but still convicted under an Alford Plea. She also hosts a podcast on false confessions, entitled Wrongful Conviction: False Confessions.

== Education ==
Nirider earned a Bachelor of Arts degree in political science from the University of Chicago. She then earned a Juris Doctor from the Northwestern University Pritzker School of Law, graduating magna cum laude in 2008.

== Career ==
After a year-long stint at Sidley Austin as a litigator, she returned to Northwestern University as a clinical fellow in law in 2009, and was promoted to assistant professor in 2013.

Nirider has stated that one of her reasons for entering juvenile law (in particular focusing on false confessions) was her involvement in the Dassey case while Drizin's postgraduate student in 2007. While working briefly in commercial law Nirider says she continued to contribute to the Dassey case.

=== Center on Wrongful Convictions of Youth ===
From 2009 to 2019, Nirider was co-director of the Center on Wrongful Convictions of Youth, alongside Prof. Steven Drizin. The clinic was then merged back into the Center of Wrongful Convictions.

Becoming legally expert on how children can be coerced into giving a confession for crimes that they did not commit, Nirider often discusses purposeful or inadvertent tactics which can break down or mislead young people. She states that even well-meaning police interrogators can induce a false confession from vulnerable people. Interrogation is often taught with the aim of extracting information from stubborn, hardened, and fully-grown individuals, hence making it unsuitable for use on young people and especially vulnerable young people. The center aims to tackle this issue through teaching upcoming law students, as well as attorneys and judges, and lobbying policy-makers. One such law that Drizin helped to introduce was one requiring juvenile custodial interviews in Wisconsin to be videotaped, which was enacted before the 2006 interrogations of Brendan Dassey.

Nirider currently teaches law students about false confessions in young people, a course she attended herself when she was a student. She has published extensively on the causes of false confessions, and has been invited to give keynote talks at multitudes of conferences and symposia concerning issues within the justice system and forensic science. Alongside the International Association of Police Chiefs, Nirider and members of the Center have published guidelines on how to effectively interview young people without coercing a false confession.

Nirider has been interviewed about the concerning role of Reid technique interrogation being taught to school officials in order to extract confessions from students, highlighting the stark differences in awareness between adult and juvenile individuals. Changes to interrogation techniques, such as a move away from the Reid technique, could benefit both innocent juveniles and adults.

Nirider, alongside Drizin, has undertaken tours of the UK and Ireland discussing her work on Making a Murderer and the science of coerced confessions. She has been interviewed extensively by the media, and also Innocence Project, as a result of publicity from the documentary.

In 2017 she and Drizin were jointly awarded the Northwestern Law Alumni Award for Public Service, dedicated to the memory of Dawn Clark Netsch, in recognition of their work for the CWCY.

== Notable cases ==
=== Brendan Dassey ===
Brendan Dassey was featured on Making a Murderer. Nirider featured briefly in the final episode of the first season of the documentary, which propelled her to fame among some fans of the show. She is featured throughout the second series as it chronicles the CWCY's efforts to remove Dassey's confession being confirmed as evidence, the only piece of evidence that links him to the murder of Teresa Halbach. Nirider has been very critical of the methods used to interrogate a vulnerable and "mentally-limited" 16 year-old, as well as of Dassey's pretrial legal representation.

Dassey remains behind bars. After the US Supreme Court did not review, Dassey's remaining options were said to be extremely limited unless new evidence were brought forth. A plea for clemency to the Wisconsin governor also failed, in response to which Nirider wrote an impassioned op-ed.

Nirider and colleagues repeatedly stated in legal briefs, academic papers and media interviews that Dassey had always said he was at a bonfire on Monday (October 31, 2005), contrary to the record that he adopted the suggestion in 2006 when interrogators claimed they knew he was.

=== Damien Echols ===
Damien Echols was a member of the West Memphis Three who had been sentenced to death but, after new DNA testing and litigation by various attorneys, he was released in 2011. The Center on Wrongful Convictions, with Nirider as co-counsel, had prepared an amicus brief. Nirider uses the cases of Echols and Dassey both to highlight the potential benefits of media attention to cases of wrongful guilt. Featured briefly in the documentary West of Memphis.

=== Dixmoor 5 ===
The Dixmoor 5 were a group of men believed to have given false confessions in police interviews. Nirider was co-counsel for three members, and they were exonerated in 2011.
