= Journal of Criminal Law & Criminology =

- Discipline: Criminal law, criminology
- Language: English
- Edited by: Joseph McInerney

Publication details
- Former names: Journal of the American Institute of Criminal Law and Criminology, The Journal of Criminal Law, Criminology, and Police Science
- History: Since 1910
- Publisher: Northwestern University School of Law (United States)
- Frequency: Quarterly

Standard abbreviations
- Bluebook: J. Crim. L. & Criminology
- ISO 4: J. Crim. Law Criminol.

Indexing
- CODEN: JCLCFB
- ISSN: 0091-4169
- LCCN: 80644520
- OCLC no.: 803836960

Links
- Journal homepage; Online archive

The Journal of Criminal Law & Criminology is a quarterly peer-reviewed, student-run academic journal published by the Northwestern University School of Law. It hosts an annual symposium focused on a select topic of criminal law.

== History ==
The journal was established in 1910 as the Journal of the American Institute of Criminal Law and Criminology by Dean John Henry Wigmore. From 1931 to 1951 it was renamed Journal of Criminal Law and Criminology and from 1951 to 1972 The Journal of Criminal Law, Criminology, and Police Science. It received its current name in 1973.

The journal was an outgrowth of the "National Conference on Criminal Law and Criminology," hosted at Northwestern University School of Law in 1909 in celebration of the law school's fiftieth anniversary. Consistent with the progressive agenda in the early twentieth century, the purpose of the journal was to articulate and promote criminal justice reform.

== Notable alumni ==
- Steven Drizin, lawyer and law professor at the Northwestern University Pritzker School of Law, Editor-in-Chief 1967-68
