= Patrick Willis (judge) =

Retired American judge

The Honorable Patrick Willis

Wisconsin Circuit Court Judge for the Manitowoc Circuit, Branch 1
- In office July 1997 – October 5, 2012
- Appointed by: Tommy Thompson
- Preceded by: Allan J. Deehr
- Succeeded by: Mark R. Rohrer

Personal details
- Born: Patrick Lee Willis; February 1, 1950 (age 76) Manitowoc, Wisconsin, U.S
- Education: Marquette University; University of Wisconsin Law School
- Occupation: Lawyer, Judge

Patrick Lee Willis (born February 1, 1950) is an American lawyer and retired judge. He was a Wisconsin Circuit Court judge in Manitowoc County, Wisconsin, from 1997 until 2012. Willis gained national recognition when he presided over the highly publicized Steven Avery homicide trial in 2007; his rulings regarding the admissibility of certain key pieces of evidence were frequent sources of news stories.

== Early life ==
Willis grew up in Manitowoc, Wisconsin. He graduated from Marquette University in Milwaukee, Wisconsin, in 1972 with an honors degree in history. Willis attended law school at the University of Wisconsin–Madison, graduating with a J.D. degree in 1975. During law school, he served as an editor of the Wisconsin Law Review.

== Legal career ==
Willis was admitted to the State Bar of Wisconsin in June 1975. He first worked as an attorney for the law firm of Muchin & Muchin in Manitowoc. In May 1977 he was hired as the City Attorney for the city of Manitowoc. His tenure as city attorney involved serving as a legal advisor to the mayor and the common council. Willis helped bring the S.S. Badger car ferry back to Manitowoc and was instrumental in the revival of the Burger Boat Company.

Wisconsin Governor Tommy Thompson appointed Willis as Manitowoc County Circuit Court judge in 1997 to fill a vacancy left by Allan Deehr. Upon completion of his interim term, Willis successfully ran for the same position in 1998, receiving more than 80% of the vote. He was re-elected in 2002 and 2008, and retired from the bench in October 2012.

Willis presided over the highly publicized Steven Avery/Teresa Halbach murder case in 2007. Because Avery had been exonerated of rape and freed in 2003 after serving 18 years in prison, the trial attracted national media attention. In 2015, the Avery trial was the subject of Netflix's true crime documentary series Making a Murderer.

Legal offices
Preceded by Allan J. Deehr	Wisconsin Circuit Court Judge for the Manitowoc Circuit, Branch 1; 1997 – 2012	Succeeded by Mark R. Rohrer
