= Pritzker School of Law =

Law school in Chicago, Illinois, US

Northwestern University Pritzker School of Law
- Motto: Quaecumque sunt vera (Latin); Ὁ Λόγος πλήρης χάριτος καὶ ἀληθείας - Ho logos pleres charitos kai aletheias (Greek); Whatsoever things are true (Philippians 4:8 AV); The word full of grace and truth (Gospel of John 1:14)
- Established: 1859 (as law department of the Old University of Chicago); 1873 (as Union College of Law); 1891 (as Northwestern University School of Law); 2015 (current name)
- School type: Private law school
- Parent endowment: $14.3 billion
- Dean: Zachary Clopton
- Location: Chicago, Illinois, U.S. 41.8963°N 87.6174°W
- Enrollment: 658
- Faculty: 190
- USNWR ranking: 9th (tie) (2026)
- Bar pass rate: 92% (2017)
- Website: law.northwestern.edu
- ABA profile: Standard 509 Report

The Northwestern University Pritzker School of Law, formerly known as Northwestern University School of Law from 1891 to 2015, is the law school of Northwestern University and located in the Streeterville neighborhood of Chicago, Illinois, United States. It is considered part of the T14, an unofficial designation in the legal community for the best law schools in the United States.

Founded in 1859, it was the first law school established in the city of Chicago. Notable alumni include numerous governors of several states; Arthur Goldberg, United States Supreme Court justice; Adlai Stevenson, governor of Illinois, cabinet secretary, and Democratic presidential candidate; John Paul Stevens, United States Supreme Court justice; Newton Minow, former chairman of the Federal Communications Commission (FCC); Harold Washington, the first black mayor of Chicago (1983–87) and, previously, a member of the United States House of Representatives; and JB Pritzker, current governor of Illinois.

== History ==
Founded in 1859, the school now known as the Northwestern University Pritzker School of Law was the first law school established in Chicago. The school was originally the law department of the Old University of Chicago under the founding direction of Henry Booth and enrolled twenty-three students. The law school became Union College of Law when it was jointly affiliated with Northwestern University in 1873. In 1891, the law school formally became the Northwestern University School of Law when Northwestern assumed total control.

During the 20th century, programs such as the JD-MBA and JD-PhD were added, helping to maintain the school's position among America's top-ranked law schools. In the 1930s, the school was home to the Scientific Crime Detection Laboratory, which student Fred E. Inbau would direct and from which he would train prosecutors and police, leading to the Reid technique of deceptive interrogation to obtain confessions.

In October 2015, the Northwestern University School of Law was renamed the Northwestern University Pritzker School of Law following a US$100 million donation to the law school by JB Pritzker and his wife, MK Pritzker.

In July 2024, a lawsuit was filed by a conservative group against the university citing its activities to increase the hiring of women and people of color for its faculty, as a violation of federal law prohibiting discrimination for reasons of race or sex, one year after affirmative action college admissions in the United States was struck down by the Supreme Court of the United States. The suit asserts that the law school discriminates against, specifically, white men in faculty hiring, as well as in selection of articles published in its noted law review.

== Academics ==
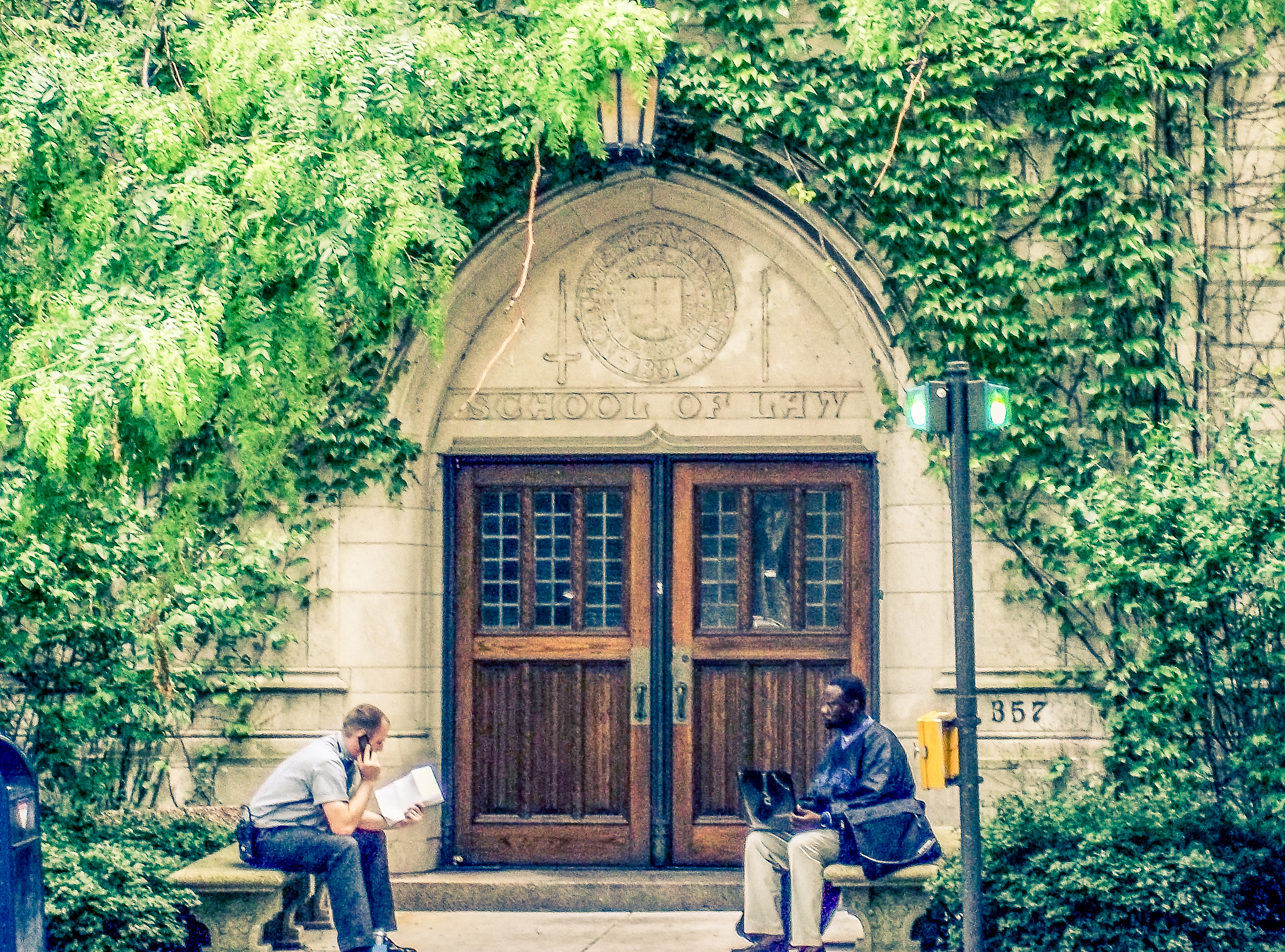
Entrance to Levy Meyer Hall

=== Admissions ===
Admission to Northwestern Law is highly selective. For the class entering in the fall of 2024, 972 out of 6,327 (15.4%) were offered admission, with 242 matriculating. The 25th and 75th LSAT percentiles for the 2024 entering class were 166 and 174, respectively, with a median of 172. The 25th and 75th undergraduate GPA percentiles were 3.77 and 4.00, respectively, with a median of 3.95.

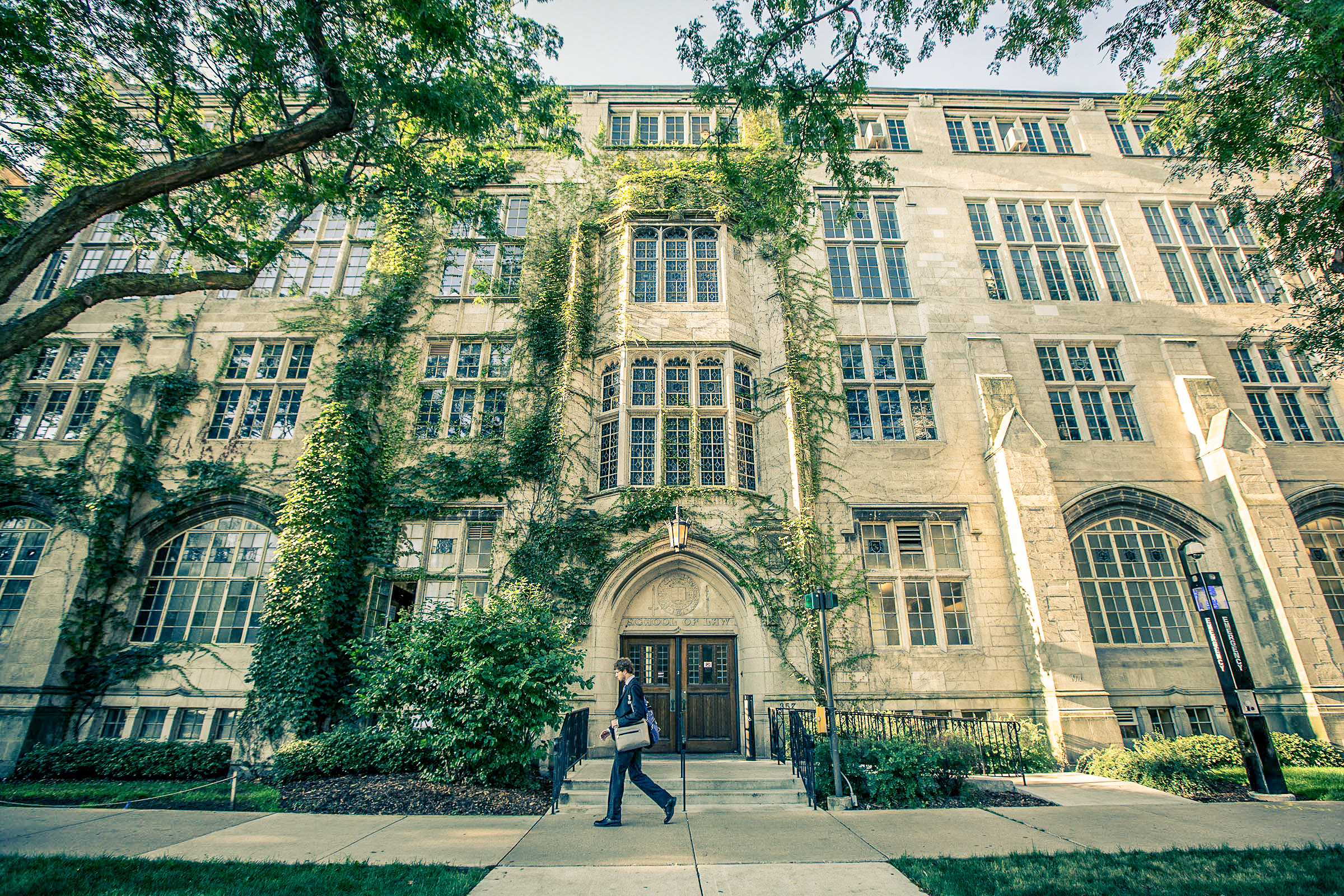
Levy Mayer Hall

The law school's practical philosophy is manifested in a strong preference for applicants with at least two years of work experience. Approximately 90% of the school's students enter with at least one year of full-time work experience; 70% possess more than two years of experience.

=== Costs ===
The total cost of attendance (indicating the cost of tuition, fees, living expenses, books, and other miscellaneous expenses) at Northwestern Law for the 2022-2023 academic year is $104,564. The Law School Transparency estimated debt-financed cost of attendance for three years is $367,588.

2022-23 Expenses
| Category | Per Annum |
|---|---|
| Tuition and Fees | $71,432 |
| Room and board | $19,026 |
| Books | $1,650 |
| Miscellaneous expenses | $12,456 |
| Total | $104,564 |

=== Journals ===
Northwestern Law sponsors seven student-run scholarly legal journals. Student staff members are selected based on a writing competition, editing competition, and first-year grades, or a publishable note or comment on a legal topic.

==== Northwestern Journal of International Law & Business ====
The Journal of International Law and Business has a substantive focus on private international law, as opposed to public international law or human rights. It seeks scholarship analyzing transnational and international legal problems and their effect on private entities. The Journal's stated goal is to promote an understanding of the future course of international legal developments as they relate to private entities.

==== Northwestern University Law Review ====
The Northwestern University Law Review was first published in 1906 when it was called the "Illinois Law Review." Prior editors include: Roscoe Pound, long-time dean of Harvard Law School; Judge Robert A. Sprecher of the United States Court of Appeals for the Seventh Circuit; US Supreme Court Justice John Paul Stevens; Dean James A. Rahl; Illinois Governor Daniel Walker; and former chairman of the Federal Communications Commission Newton N. Minow; US Supreme Court Justice Arthur Goldberg and Presidential Candidate Adlai Stevenson.

==== Northwestern Journal of Technology and Intellectual Property ====
The Northwestern Journal of Technology and Intellectual Property addresses subjects relating to law at the intersection of technology and intellectual property, including law and biotechnology, copyrights, the Internet, media, patents, telecommunications, and trademarks.

==== Journal of Criminal Law and Criminology ====
The School states that its Journal of Criminal Law and Criminology "is one of the most widely read and widely cited publications in the world". It is the second most widely subscribed journal published by any law school in the country. It is one of the most widely circulated law journals in the country. The journal was founded in 1910 by Dean John Henry Wigmore.

==== Journal of Law and Social Policy ====
The Journal of Law and Social Policy is an interdisciplinary journal that explores the impact of the law on different aspects of society. Topics covered include race, gender, sexual orientation, housing, immigration, health care, juvenile justice, voting rights, family law, civil rights, poverty, the environment, and privacy rights.

==== Journal of Human Rights ====
The Journal of Human Rights is an interdisciplinary journal for the discussion of human rights issues and law.

==== Northwestern Law Journal des Refusés ====
The Northwestern Law Journal des Refusés is a "journal of law for legal rejects and the legal avant-garde" founded in 2022. It was inspired by the Paris Salon des Refusés and aims to discuss legal issues in a way that is more accessible to the general public, as well as help readers trying to understand more difficult works. It publishes one print-issue each Spring and additional online articles throughout the year.

=== Clinics and centers ===
==== Pritzker Legal Research Center ====
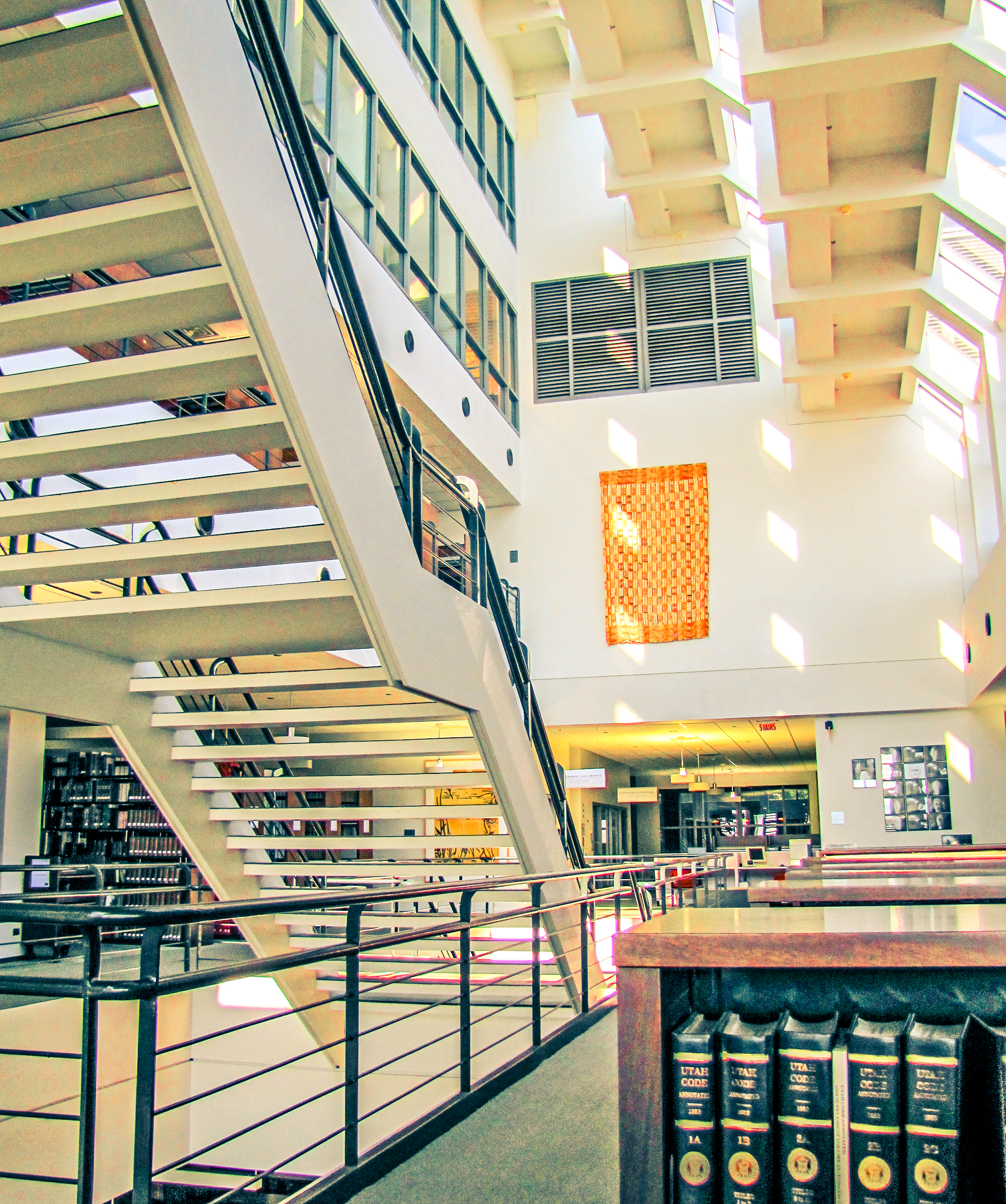
The Pritzker Legal Research Center is home to more than 829,974 books, journals, and other publications.

The Pritzker Legal Research Center is the library, and fulfills the research and information needs of the faculty and students of Northwestern Law. The Center is named after the Pritzker family, a philanthropic Chicago family. Jay A. Pritzker (1922-1999) graduated from Northwestern University in 1941 and Northwestern University School of Law in 1947.

==== Bluhm Legal Clinic ====
Clinical education at Northwestern dates back to the law school's beginnings. An innovative program developed by Dean John Henry Wigmore in 1910 with the Chicago Legal Aid Society evolved into the Legal Clinic, which opened its doors in 1969 with only two staff attorneys. In 2000, the Clinic was named for Northwestern University trustee and alum Neil Bluhm, a billionaire in real estate and casinos. Today, the Bluhm Legal Clinic houses around 20 clinics within 14 centers and is widely recognized as one of the most comprehensive and effective clinical programs in the country. Through the law school's clinical program, students gain direct experience representing clients and fine-tune their skills as advocates. They also work with clinical faculty and staff to challenge the fairness of our legal institutions and to propose solutions for reform. From 2000 to 2013, its director was Steven Drizin.

==== Center on Wrongful Convictions ====
The Center on Wrongful Convictions (CWC) is dedicated to identifying and rectifying wrongful convictions. The Center investigates possible wrongful convictions and represents imprisoned clients with claims of actual innocence. It also focuses on raising public awareness of the prevalence, causes, and social costs of wrongful convictions and promoting reform of the criminal justice system. In 2009, faculty member Prof Steven Drizin co-founded a sister project to this Center, a Center on Wrongful Convictions of Youth, which was merged back into the main center after 2018.

==== Appellate Advocacy Center ====
Established in 2006, the Appellate Advocacy Center includes the Federal Appellate Clinic and the Supreme Court Clinic, along with a moot program for practitioners. The Appellate Advocacy Center is directed by Xiao Wang.

In the Federal Appellate Clinic, students research and brief cases in federal appellate courts across the country. In certain instances, where a case involves significant federal issues or interests, students will also participate in state appellate court work. Clinic cases generally focus on immigration, qualified immunity, and criminal sentencing and post-conviction issues, although other topics and matters are covered as well. Where possible, Clinic students participate in oral argument before a United States court of appeals.

In the Supreme Court Clinic, students work with attorneys at Sidley Austin to draft certiorari, merits, and amicus briefs before the Supreme Court. Sidley attorneys Carter Phillips and Jeffrey Green co-direct the Supreme Court Clinic.

The Clinic works on a variety of legal matters. During any given year, the Clinic will file briefs in cases concerning international law, tribal law, sentencing, criminal procedure, habeas, and the First Amendment. The Clinic frequently collaborates with state and federal public defenders. The Clinic also works with nonprofit organizations, including the National Association of Criminal Defense Lawyers. In fall 2021, the Clinic partnered with Northwestern's Center for International Human Rights, Amnesty International, Global Justice Center, and Human Rights Watch to file an amicus brief in Dobbs v. Jackson Women's Health Organization, asserting that Mississippi's abortion ban was inconsistent with international law.

==== Children and Family Justice Center ====
The Children and Family Justice Center represents young people on matters of delinquency and crime, family violence, school discipline, health and disability, and immigration and asylum. Attorneys, a social worker, and affiliated professionals help second- and third-year law students meet with clients, research legal issues, learn pretrial investigation, interviewing, and counseling skills, and litigate cases.

==== MacArthur Justice Center ====
The MacArthur Justice Center focuses its work on police misconduct, wrongful detention compensation, post-9/11 work, and other public interest and civil rights issues. Of particular note is the Guantanamo Bay detainee representation led by Joseph Margulies, author of Guantanamo and the Abuse of Presidential Power and lead counsel in Rasul v. Bush.

==== Donald Pritzker Entrepreneurship Law Center ====
The Donald Pritzker Entrepreneurship Law Center (DPELC), founded as the Small Business Opportunity Center (SBOC), is a transactional clinic that was founded in 1998. Clients include technology executives, consultants, inventors, manufacturers and sellers of consumer products, musical groups, and persons interested in establishing nonprofit organizations.

The Center is also heavily involved in teaching in the field of entrepreneurship law, and hosts symposia and conferences to facilitate that endeavor.

==== Center for International Human Rights ====
The Center for International Human Rights works to advance human rights while enabling students to test and refine their academic learning in real cases. Stressing a comprehensive interdisciplinary approach, the center provides policy perspectives to the United Nations, the Organization of American States, the U.S. Department of State, foreign governments, and nongovernmental organizations. Over the years faculty and staff working in the center have addressed, among other matters, the role of the International Criminal Court, international terrorism, U.S. death penalty laws, truth commissions, economic rights, NATO's humanitarian intervention, and political asylum cases. Students have investigated cases and had summer internships in Guatemala, Indonesia, and at the U.N. Human Rights Centre in Geneva.

The Center also offers students an opportunity to earn an LLM in Human Rights. The degree program is designed for students from transitional democracies and for those with career interests in international human rights law.

==== Investor Protection Center ====
The Investor Protection Center provides assistance to investors with limited income or small dollar claims who are unable to obtain legal representation. Law students, under the supervision of faculty attorneys, represent customers in handling their disputes with broker-dealers.

During the last few years, the (Financial Industry Regulatory Authority)(FINRA) and other organizations have taken steps to make more information and services available to investors. Northwestern Law's Investor Protection Center operates with the aid of grants from the FINRA Investor Education Foundation and other organizations to focus on priority areas. In particular, the Center is focused on helping to meet the needs of women, novice investors, and the elderly, in connection with securities arbitration.

==== Fred Bartlit Center for Trial Advocacy ====
Named in honor of an innovative leader in litigation and business strategies, the Fred Bartlit Center for Trial Advocacy was established in 1999 to conduct research and teach innovative and technologically advanced trial strategy. The Bartlit Center focuses on changes in trial craft brought on by new technologies and compensation approaches.

The Bartlit Center sponsors and conducts academic research on the litigation process; support teaching skills in the JD program; and holds national conferences to explore and teach innovative trial and trial management strategies. The Bartlit Center works to complement the law school's program in simulation-based teaching of trial skills and builds on the research produced by Northwestern Law faculty.

== Campus ==
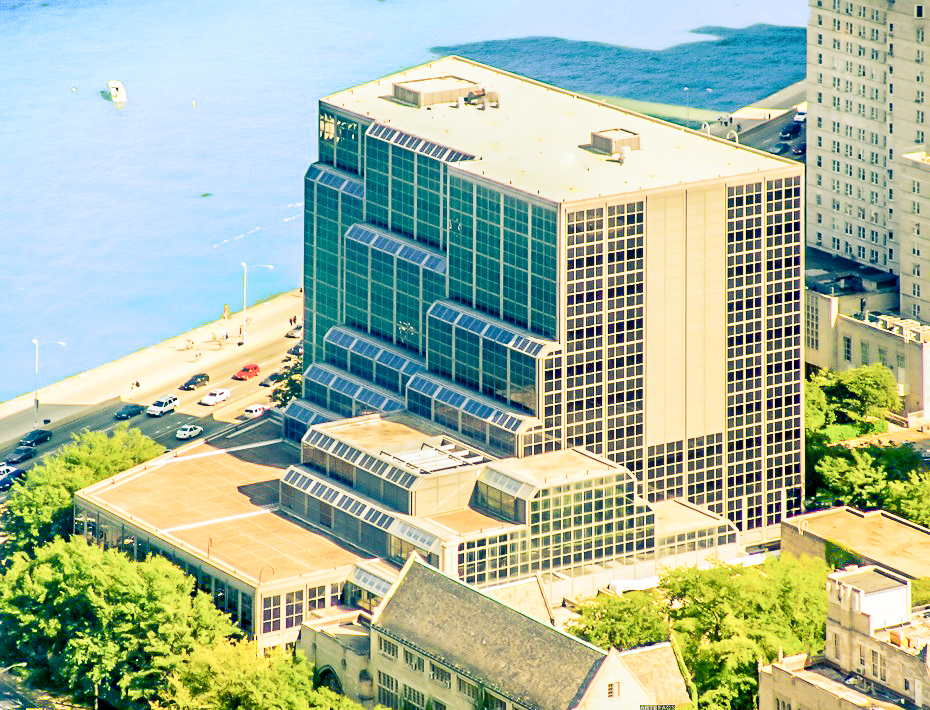
The modernist Rubloff Building is part of the law school section of Northwestern's Chicago campus and overlooks Lake Michigan. To its west in the foreground are partial views of the original law school buildings designed by James Gamble Rogers in the 1920s

Northwestern Law is located on Northwestern University's downtown campus in Chicago's Streeterville/Gold Coast neighborhood. The law school is on Lake Shore Drive and Chicago Avenue, adjacent to Lake Shore Park and Lake Michigan, and a few blocks from the John Hancock Center, Magnificent Mile, Water Tower, Oak Street Beach, and Navy Pier.

The law school's location in the heart of downtown Chicago provides a wealth of part-time employment options for students while in school and a setting in which to study law. The proximity to courts, commerce, and public interest activities enables students to experience the practice of law, as well as its theory.

== Reception ==
=== Employment ===
According to U.S. News & World Report's 2021 Edition, 94% of the law school's 2021 graduates obtained prospective, full-time employment prior to graduation, with a median starting salary of $215,000. According to Northwestern's official 2022 ABA-required disclosures, 94% of the Class of 2022 obtained full-time, long-term employment ten months after graduation. Northwestern's Law School Transparency under-employment score is 4.4%, indicating the percentage of the Class of 2018 unemployed, pursuing an additional degree, or working in a non-professional, short-term, or part-time job nine months after graduation.

Northwestern Law is well-established among BigLaw firms (defined as firms with 251 or more associates). In Vault's 2016 survey, of over 15,000 BigLaw associates, Northwestern Law ranked #2 as a "feeder" school for BigLaw firms, after accounting for school size. According to Vault, Northwestern Law outperforms its expected BigLaw representation by 315%. Northwestern Law ranked 2nd, 4th, and 3rd in 2021, 2022, and 2023 respectively for the highest percentage of juris doctor graduates who receive associate positions at the largest 100 law firms in the country.

The law school enrolls approximately 985 students in its J.D., LL.M., S.J.D. and M.S.L. (Master of Science in Law) programs. The school employs an interdisciplinary research faculty, and has a low student-faculty ratio. The 2016 student/faculty ratio was 6.5 to 1. According to Northwestern's 2016 ABA-required disclosures, 93% of the Class of 2016 obtained full-time, long-term employment nine months after graduation.

=== Rankings and honors ===
The 2026 edition of U.S. News & World Report Best Grad Schools ranked Northwestern Law:
- 9th (tied) in the country Overall

The Above the Law 2019 law school rankings ranked Northwestern Law:
- 4th in the country Overall

Leiter's Law School Rankings placed the law school:
- 5th in Percentage of Federal Appellate Clerkships for 2008–2009
- 6th in Success Rate of Graduates on the Teaching Market 2006-2008
- 9th in Student Quality
- 10th in Total Supreme Court Clerks for 2000-2007 terms
- 11th for Largest Gross Endowment

The Princeton Review (2007) placed the law school:
- 1st for Best Career Prospects
- 7th for Toughest to Get Into
- 9th for Best Quality of Life
- 10th for Best Overall Academic Experience

Judging the Law Schools (2009) ranked the law school:
- 7th in the country Overall

The 2010 National Law Journal "Go-To Schools" list ranked Northwestern Law:
- 1st for Percentage of Graduates Hired by NLJ250 Firms

=== In popular media ===
- The Chicago Code was substantially filmed on the Northwestern Law campus in Chicago. This television drama premiered on Fox on February 7, 2011. Filming at Northwestern Law began in August 2010. Classrooms in the law school are depicted as interior offices for the fictional offices for City administration. Levy Mayer 212 served as the main taping location at the law school.
- In The Judge, Robert Downey Jr. plays the role of a Chicago defense attorney who is a Northwestern Law graduate.
- Prof Steven Drizin and Prof Laura Nirider feature heavily in the 2016 Netflix documentary Making a Murderer as the post-conviction legal representatives of Brendan Dassey. Dassey’s confession is thought by many to be false and coerced, so both Drizin and Nirider are acting as part of work by the Center on Wrongful Convictions of Youth.

== People ==
=== Notable faculty ===
Notable Northwestern Law faculty, past and present, include:

- Ronald J. Allen, renowned evidence scholar and adviser to foreign governments on law reform
- Steven Calabresi, constitutional scholar and founder and chairman of the Federalist Society
- Steven Drizin
- Edwin R. Keedy, dean of the University of Pennsylvania Law School
- Andrew Koppelman, noted legal scholar on same-sex marriage
- Leon Green, former dean; known for pioneering work in the law of torts, especially causation and injuries to relations
- Charles T. McCormick, expert on evidence, damages, and federal court procedure; writings include the classic hornbooks, Handbook on the Law of Damages (1935) and Handbook on the Law of Evidence (1954).
- John O. McGinnis, expert on trade law and one of nation's leading scholars in the field of Constitutional Law.
- Dawn Clark Netsch, expert in governmental organization law and the first woman to be nominated by a major political party to run for Governor of Illinois.
- James E. Pfander, civil procedure, federal courts, and constitutional law scholar
- Roscoe Pound, former dean of Harvard Law School, founder of the movement for "sociological jurisprudence"
- Martin Redish, civil procedure and constitutional law scholar
- David S. Ruder, former chairman of the Securities and Exchange Commission
- David Scheffer, international law and war crimes expert who served as the first United States Ambassador-at-Large for War Crimes Issues
- Charles Taylor, political philosopher, Royal Society of Canada fellow, British Academy fellow, member of the American Academy of Arts & Sciences
- David E. Van Zandt, former dean of Northwestern University School of Law
- John Henry Wigmore, the "father of modern evidence," first full-time dean of Northwestern Law (1901) and author of Treatise on Evidence

=== Alumni ===
Selected prominent Northwestern Law alumni include:

==== Academia ====
- Diane Marie Amann, the Emily & Ernest Woodruff Chair in International Law and Faculty Co-Director of the Dean Rusk International Law Center at the University of Georgia School of Law, and Special Adviser to the Prosecutor of the International Criminal Court on Children in & affected by Armed Conflict.
- Raoul Berger, one of America 's foremost legal historians, former Senior Fellow in American Legal History at Harvard University and author of Government by Judiciary: The Transformation of the Fourteenth Amendment
- George Burditt, adjunct member of the faculty
- G. Marcus Cole, Professor of Law, Helen L. Crocker Faculty Scholar, and Associate Dean for Curriculum, Stanford Law School
- Steven Drizin, lawyer and law professor at the Northwestern University Pritzker School of Law
- T. Markus Funk, law professor at the University of Chicago and Oxford University (where he received hi PhD), federal prosecutor (Chicago) who prosecuted the Operation Family Secrets mob case, Section Chief with the US State Department (Kosovo) and partner at White & Case.
- Thomas F. Geraghty, Associate Dean for Clinical Education; Professor of Law; Director, Bluhm Legal Clinic, Northwestern University School of Law
- Kristin E. Hickman, Distinguished McKnight University Professor and the Harlan Albert Rogers Professor in Law at the University of Minnesota Law School
- Charles P. Kindregan, Jr., expert in assisted reproduction law, Professor at Suffolk University Law School
- James Nabrit Jr., president of Howard University and pioneering civil rights law academic and attorney
- Kate A. Shaw, law professor at Benjamin N. Cardozo School of Law, podcast co-host and ABC News Supreme Court contributor
- Jonathan Turley, J.B. and Maurice C. Shapiro Professor of Public Interest Law, The George Washington University Law School

==== For-profit / Non-profit organizations ====
- Ferdinand Lee Barnett, founder of The Chicago Conservator
- Eddie Einhorn, owner of the Chicago White Sox
- Shari Dunn, non-profit executive and author
- Matt Ferguson, president and CEO of Careerbuilder.com
- Elbert Henry Gary, co-founder, president, and chairman of United States Steel Corporation; namesake of Gary, Indiana
- Michael Goodkin, quantitative finance entrepreneur and founder of Arbitrage Management Company ("AMC")
- Randall Kaplan, founder of Akamai Technologies
- Marc J. Lane, founder of The Marc J. Lane Wealth Group
- Robert R. McCormick, United States colonel; co-founder of law firm Stuart G. Shepard and Robert R. McCormick, (later Kirkland & Ellis); publisher of the Chicago Tribune
- Morgan E. O'Brien, co-founder and former chairman of Nextel
- Jay A. Pritzker, co-founder Hyatt Hotels Corporation
- Frank C. Rathje, founder of the Mutual National Bank of Chicago and president of the American Bankers Association
- Jerry Reinsdorf, owner of the Chicago White Sox and Chicago Bulls
- Howard A. Tullman, serial entrepreneur, venture capitalist
- Mark Walter, founder and CEO of Guggenheim Partners and Chairman of Los Angeles Dodgers

==== Government and politics ====
- George Wildman Ball (1933), former Undersecretary of State, former U.S. Ambassador to the United Nations
- Ferdinand L. Barnett, Civil Rights activist and Assistant State's Attorney in Illinois, husband of Ida B. Wells.
- Richard Ben-Veniste, Chief of the Watergate Special Prosecutor's Office Watergate Task Force
- Judy Biggert (J.D. 1963), U.S. representative, 1999–2013
- William Jennings Bryan, former U.S. Secretary of State and three-time Democratic Nominee for president
- Dale Bumpers, former governor of Arkansas and U.S. Senator for Arkansas
- Salem J. Chalabi, First General Director of the Iraqi Special Tribunal to try Saddam Hussein
- Alfred Cilella, Illinois state legislator
- Dennis Daugaard, Governor of South Dakota
- William Dawson, first African American to chair a Congressional Committee, beginning in 1949.
- Richard Devine, Cook County Former State's Attorney
- Edward Dunne, Former governor of Illinois, Former mayor of Chicago
- W. Neil Eggleston, White House Counsel under President Barack Obama
- Carl R. Feld, Wisconsin State Assembly
- Florence Kelley (1894), social reformer, early advocate for the minimum wage, eight-hour workdays, and children's rights; first general secretary of the National Consumers League; helped to create the National Association for the Advancement of Colored People (NAACP).
- Ada Kepley, first American woman to obtain a law degree (1870)
- Robert Todd Lincoln (1866), U.S. Minister to the United Kingdom (1889–1893); 35th United States Secretary of War (1881–1885)
- Wendy E. Long, Republican nominee for United States Senate from New York in 2012 and 2016
- Frank Orren Lowden, Former governor of Illinois, third-place finisher in the 1920 Republican party convention, second-place finisher in the 1928 convention
- J. Curtis McKay, Wisconsin State Assembly
- Albert E. Mead, former governor of Washington
- Newton Minow, former chairman of the Federal Communications Commission
- Dawn Clark Netsch, first woman to be elected to a state-wide constitutional office in Illinois
- Graham T. Perry, second African-American elected for assistant attorney general for the State of Illinois
- J. B. Pritzker, Managing Partner of Pritzker Group Venture Capital, and current governor of Illinois
- Pat Quinn, former governor of Illinois
- Tom Railsback, former United States Representative
- Henry T. Rainey, 40th Speaker of the United States House of Representatives
- José Abad Santos, 5th Chief Justice of the Supreme Court of the Philippines
- Jerry Springer, former Mayor of Cincinnati, television talk show host
- Seymour Stedman, former shepherd with only three years of education, admitted while working as a janitor; Socialist Party of America nominee for Vice-President of the United States (and for Mayor of Chicago)
- Halvor Steenerson, former U.S. representative
- Adlai Stevenson, former governor of Illinois, two-time Democratic nominee for president, and Ambassador to the United Nations
- Suhas Subramanyam, Member of the U.S. House of Representatives
- Charles M. Thomson, former U.S. representative
- Jim Thompson, former governor of Illinois
- Daniel Walker, former governor of Illinois
- Harold Washington, first black mayor of Chicago (1983–87), Member of the U.S. House of Representatives
- Richard E. Wiley, former chairman of the Federal Communications Commission
- Paul Ziffren, Democratic National Committee chair
- Albert Goldman (politician) (J.D. 1925), socialist lawyer and political activist, personal lawyer of Leon Trotsky during his stay in Mexico City

==== Judiciary ====
- Simeon R. Acoba, Jr., Hawaii Supreme Court Justice
- Mary Bartelme, influential pioneer in juvenile justice, first woman elected judge in Illinois.
- Dalveer Bhandari, Judge at the International Court of Justice, 2012–present
- Rubén Castillo, Chief Judge of the United States District Court for the Northern District of Illinois
- Edmond E. Chang, U.S. District judge for United States District Court for the Northern District of Illinois
- Joel Flaum, United States Court of Appeals for the Seventh Circuit Judge
- Michael B. Brennan, United States Court of Appeals for the Seventh Circuit Judge
- Michael Y. Scudder, United States Court of Appeals for the Seventh Circuit Judge
- Arthur Goldberg, former United States Supreme Court Justice, U.S. Secretary of Labor, and Ambassador to the United Nations
- Jim Jones, Chief Justice of the Idaho Supreme Court
- Carole Kamin, first woman to become president of a state bar in the United States; Cook County Circuit Court Judge
- Kenesaw Mountain Landis, first Commissioner of Major League Baseball, for U.S. District Judge for the United States District Court for the Northern District of Illinois
- Roberto A. Lange, U.S. District Judge for the United States District Court for the District of South Dakota
- Joan Larsen, U.S. Circuit Judge for the United States Court of Appeals for the Sixth Circuit
- Joan Lefkow, U.S. District Judge for United States District Court for the Northern District of Illinois
- John Paul Stevens, United States Supreme Court Justice
- Richard Tallman, United States Court of Appeals for the Ninth Circuit Senior Judge
- Horace Ward, challenged racial discrimination at the University of Georgia, and first African American to become a judge of the United States District Court for the Northern District of Georgia

==== Firsts ====
- Mary Bartelme, first woman elected judge in Illinois.
- Ferdinand L. Barnett, first African-American assistant State's Attorney in Illinois.
- Salem J. Chalabi, first General Director of the Iraqi Special Tribunal to try Saddam Hussein
- William Dawson, first African American to chair a congressional committee.
- Ada Kepley, first woman in the United States to graduate from a law school
- Kenesaw Mountain Landis, first Commissioner of Major League Baseball, former U.S. District Judge for the United States District Court for the Northern District of Illinois
- Dawn Clark Netsch, first woman to be elected to a statewide constitutional office in Illinois
- Harold Washington, first African American Mayor of Chicago (1983–87), Member of the U.S. House of Representatives
- Horace Ward, challenged racial discrimination at the University of Georgia, and first African American to become a federal judge in Georgia
- Lloyd Garrison Wheeler, first African American admitted to the bar in Illinois.

==== Other ====
- Edward Moore, longtime chief music critic for the Chicago Tribune
