= Leslie Eisenberg =

American forensic anthropologist

Leslie Eisenberg is a forensic anthropologist in Wisconsin, USA. A graduate of New York University, she is board-certified and an honorary fellow at the University of Madison-Wisconsin. She studied Native American burial grounds in Wisconsin and coauthored a book on the topic, which was published in 2000. She led a team from her university in helping identify remains after the World Trade Center attacks in 2001 and after Hurricane Katrina in 2005. She coordinates the Burial Sites Preservation Program at the Wisconsin Historical Society, and has also studied and worked in France. She worked for the office of the Wisconsin State Archaeologist.

In 2005, in November, Eisenberg became involved in the investigation into a missing photographer, Teresa Halbach, which gained a high profile due also to the main suspect, Steven Avery. Her testimony would feature in the 2015 internationally popular Netflix documentary Making a Murderer and its sequel in 2018. Wisconsin District Attorneys would describe her as "the state’s expert on all things bones" and "regarded as one of the nation’s very best bone experts". Legal arguments and confusion have continued over the identification of burned bone fragments from multiple locations.

Also from November 2005, Eisenberg was involved in another missing person case which received widespread attention, that of Christine Rudy, who was pregnant. Eisenberg was sent charred bone fragments from a burn pit linked to the main suspect, which she identified as human adult and fetus. However, in spring when ice thawed, the body of Rudy and her fetus were found in a river, unburned.

Eisenberg published a number of book reviews through her career, including in 2009 of a book on cremains by Canadian forensic anthropologist Scott Fairgrieve, who had also testified at the Avery trial.

In 2010 Eisenberg was the last coauthor on an article published in The British Medical Journal The BMJ, which purported to have identified a mummified head as French King Henry IV. The research, from multiple forensic angles, led to a prime time documentary on French television in 2011 and 2012, and a followup book in 2013. However, genetic research showed that it was a misidentification, and Eisenberg cosigned a letter asking to retract the original article.

In 2016/17 she assisted in the search and recovery of the remains of a pilot who crashed in France during World War II.
