= Thomas F. Geraghty =

Thomas F. Geraghty is the Class of 1967 B. James Haddad Professor of Law, and formerly the Associate Dean for Clinical Legal Education and Director of the Bluhm Legal Clinic at the Northwestern University Pritzker School of Law. He has also worked in Tanzania, Uganda, and Malawi on research projects with law students involving juvenile justice, the legal problems of street children, the status of children orphaned by HIV/AIDS, women in the legal profession, and freedom of the press. In 1996, He helped to design a clinical curriculum for the Addis Ababa University School of Law and recently completed an assessment of Legal Education in Ethiopia for ABA/ROLI.

== Early life and education ==
Geraghty received an AB cum laude from Harvard University and JD from Northwestern University.

== See also ==
Bluhm Legal Clinic
