= Oshkosh Correctional Institution =

Prison in Wisconsin

- Interactive map of Oshkosh Correctional Institution
- Location: 1730 W Snell Road Oshkosh, Wisconsin; 44°04′9.44″N 88°33′41.6″W
- Status: Operational
- Security class: Medium
- Capacity: Over 2,000
- Opened: 1986; 40 years ago
- Managed by: Wisconsin Department of Corrections

Oshkosh Correctional Institution (OSCI) is a prison of the Wisconsin Department of Corrections in Oshkosh, Wisconsin, United States, north of the city center. It has an official capacity of 1494.

== History ==
In 1977 the Wisconsin Legislature proposed the construction of a new 300 prisoner medium security prison on the property of the Winnebago Correctional Farm, a prison farm which was, at the time, north of Oshkosh. The terms were written within the "Flad Report" six-year master plan that the legislature issued, and they were defined under Wis. Stat. 301.16(lm). In the fall of 1984, construction of OSCI began. The prison opened in September 1986. The state decided to relocate Winnebago to Waupun and dismantle the existing Winnebago facility, so OSCI can be expanded. The City of Oshkosh annexed the territory held by OSCI. In 1996 the prison inmate population reached over 1,800.

== See also ==
- List of Wisconsin state prisons
