= Steven Avery =

American man convicted of murder and previously wrongly convicted of rape

- Born: Steven Allan Avery; July 9, 1962 (age 64); Manitowoc County, Wisconsin, U.S.
- Relatives: Brendan Dassey (nephew)
- Status: Incarcerated at Fox Lake Correctional Institution
- Conviction: First degree intentional homicide
- Penalty: Life imprisonment without parole

Steven Allan Avery (born July 9, 1962) is an American from Manitowoc County, Wisconsin who was convicted of murder in 2007. He had previously been wrongfully convicted in 1985 of sexual assault and attempted murder. After serving 18 years of a 32-year sentence (six of those years being concurrent with a kidnapping sentence), Avery was exonerated by DNA testing and released in 2003, only to be charged with murder in a different case two years later.

Avery's 2003 exoneration prompted widespread discussion of Wisconsin's criminal justice system; the Criminal Justice Reform Bill, enacted into law in 2005, implemented reforms aimed at preventing future wrongful convictions. Following his release, Avery filed a $36 million lawsuit against Manitowoc County, its former sheriff, and its former district attorney for wrongful conviction and imprisonment. In November 2005, with his civil suit still pending, he was arrested for the murder of Wisconsin photographer Teresa Halbach, and in 2007 was convicted and sentenced to life imprisonment without possibility of parole. The conviction was upheld by higher courts.

Avery's 2007 murder trial and its associated issues are the focus of the 2015 Netflix original documentary series Making a Murderer, which also covered the arrest and 2007 conviction of Avery's nephew, Brendan Dassey. In August 2016, a federal judge overturned Dassey's conviction because his confession had been coerced. In June 2017, Wisconsin prosecutors appealed this decision. Eight months later, an en banc panel of seven judges of the United States Court of Appeals for the Seventh Circuit ruled in favor of upholding the original conviction by a vote of 4 to 3, ruling that police had properly obtained Dassey's confession. On February 20, 2018, Dassey's legal team, including former United States Solicitor General Seth Waxman, filed a petition for a writ of certiorari to the U.S. Supreme Court. On June 25, 2018, certiorari was denied.

As of January 2023, Avery and his legal team continued to advocate for a new trial.

== Early life ==
Steven Avery was born in 1962 in Manitowoc County, Wisconsin, to Allan and Dolores Avery. Since 1965, his family has operated a salvage yard in the Town of Gibson, Wisconsin, on the 40-acre (16 ha) property where they lived. Avery has three siblings: Chuck, Earl, and Barb. He attended public schools in nearby Mishicot and Manitowoc, where his mother said he went to an elementary school "for slower kids". According to one of his lawyers in 1985, school records showed that his IQ was 70 and that he "barely functioned in school".

On July 24, 1982, Avery married Lori Mathiesen, who was a single mother. They have four children together: Rachel, Jennifer, and twins Steven and William.

== Early convictions ==
In March 1981, at age 18, Avery was convicted of burglarizing a bar with a friend. After serving 10 months of a two-year sentence in the Manitowoc County Jail, he was released on probation and ordered to pay restitution.

In late 1982, at age 20, Avery and another man were charged with cruelty to animals after dousing Avery’s cat with gasoline and oil and tossing it into a bonfire at the Avery junkyard, and watching the cat burn. Avery was found guilty of animal cruelty and was jailed until August 1983. "I was young and stupid, and hanging out with the wrong people", Avery said later, of his first two incarcerations.

In January 1985, Avery ran his cousin’s car off the side of the road. After she pulled over, he pointed a gun at her. He was upset and alleged that she had been spreading rumours that he had been masturbating on the front lawn, which he denied. Avery maintained that the gun was not loaded and that he only meant to frighten her into stopping what he claimed were false allegations. The cousin was the wife of a part-time Manitowoc County sheriff’s deputy. Avery was charged with endangering safety while evincing a depraved mind and possession of a firearm.

== Wrongful attempted sexual assault conviction ==
These charges later resulted in a six-year sentence, before which Avery remained free on bail pending trial. By late July 1985, he was still at liberty when a 36-year-old woman was brutally attacked and sexually assaulted while jogging on a Lake Michigan beach. Avery was arrested after the victim, Penny Beerntsen, picked him from a photo lineup, and later from a live lineup. Although Avery was forty miles away in Green Bay shortly after the attack – an alibi supported by a time-stamped store receipt and sixteen eyewitnesses – he was charged and ultimately convicted of rape and attempted murder, then sentenced to thirty-two years in prison. Appeals in 1987 and 1996 were denied by higher courts.

Around 1995, a Brown County police detective contacted the Manitowoc County Jail, saying that an inmate "had admitted committing an assault years ago in Manitowoc County and that someone else was in jail for it". The jail officer transferred the call to the Manitowoc County detective bureau. Deputies recalled Sheriff Thomas Kocourek telling them: "We already have the right guy. Don't concern yourself with it."

Avery continued to maintain his innocence in the Beerntsen case. In 2002, after serving eighteen years (the first six concurrently on the prior endangerment and weapons convictions), the Wisconsin Innocence Project used DNA testing – not available at the time of Avery's original trial – to exonerate him and to demonstrate that a different suspect, Gregory Allen, had in fact committed the crime. Allen, who bore a striking physical resemblance to Avery, had committed an assault in 1983 at the same beach where Beerntsen was later attacked in 1985, and was under police surveillance during the period of Beerntsen's assault due to his history of criminal behavior against women. However, Allen was never a suspect in the Beerntsen case, and he was not included in the photo or live lineups presented to Beerntsen. Allen, who is currently serving a 60-year sentence for an unrelated crime, was never charged in the Beerntsen case because the statute of limitations had expired.

Avery was released on September 11, 2003. By that time, his wife had divorced him, and he was estranged from his family.

Avery's wrongful conviction case attracted widespread attention. Rep. Mark Gundrum, the Republican chairman of the Wisconsin Assembly Judiciary Committee, impaneled a bipartisan task force to recommend improvements to the state's criminal justice system aimed at decreasing the likelihood of future wrongful convictions. Recommendations included a revamped eyewitness identification protocol and new guidelines for interrogations of suspects and witnesses, and the collection and storage of material evidence. The recommendations were ultimately drafted into legislation that became known as the Avery Bill, which was passed and signed in October 2005, then renamed the Criminal Justice Reform Bill a month later after Avery was charged in the Halbach case.

Avery filed a civil lawsuit against Manitowoc County; its former sheriff, Thomas Kocourek; and its former district attorney, Denis Vogel, seeking to recover $36 million in damages stemming from his wrongful conviction. The suit was settled in February 2006 for $400,000 following his murder indictment.

== Teresa Halbach murder ==
Photographer Teresa Halbach disappeared on October 31, 2005; her last appointment was a meeting with Avery, at his home near the grounds of Avery's Auto Salvage, to photograph his sister's minivan that he was offering for sale on Autotrader.com. Halbach's vehicle was found partially concealed in the salvage yard, and bloodstains recovered from its interior matched Avery's DNA. Investigators later identified charred bone fragments found in a burn pit near Avery's home.

Avery was arrested and charged with Halbach's murder, kidnapping, sexual assault, and mutilation of a corpse on November 11, 2005. He had already been charged with a weapons violation as a convicted felon. Avery maintained that the murder charge was a frameup, intended to discredit his pending civil case. Manitowoc County claimed to and did cede control of the murder investigation to the neighboring Calumet County Sheriff's Department because of Avery's suit against Manitowoc County. As part of the agreement for Calumet to use resources from Manitowoc County, including personnel, Manitowoc sheriff's deputies participated in repeated searches of Avery's trailer, garage, and property, supervised by Calumet County officers. A Manitowoc deputy found the key to Halbach's vehicle in Avery's bedroom. Avery's attorneys said there was a conflict of interest in the participation of Manitowoc County and suggested evidence tampering.

Avery's attorneys also discovered that an evidence box containing a vial of Avery's blood, collected in 1996 during his appeals efforts in the Beerntsen case, had been unsealed and contained what they believed to be a new puncture hole visible in the stopper. They speculated that the blood found in Halbach's car could have been drawn from the stored vial and planted in the vehicle to incriminate Avery. To combat this claim, the prosecution presented testimony by FBI technicians who—using a novel test developed for the Avery trial—had tested the blood recovered from Halbach's car for ethylenediaminetetraacetic acid (EDTA), a preservative used in blood vials but not present in the human body, and found none.

=== Prosecution ===
As of May 2006, Avery was the only one of the Innocence Project's 174 exonerees to have been charged with a violent crime after release.

In March 2006, Avery's nephew, Brendan Dassey, was charged as an accessory after he confessed under interrogation to having helped Avery kill Halbach and dispose of the body. He later recanted his confession, claiming that it had been coerced, and refused to testify to his involvement at Avery's trial. He testified at his own trial and never mentioned coercion. Dassey was convicted of murder, rape, and mutilation of the corpse in a separate trial.

In pretrial hearings in January 2007, charges of kidnapping and sexual assault were dropped. Avery stood trial in Calumet County in March 2007, with Calumet District Attorney Ken Kratz leading the prosecution, and Manitowoc County Circuit Court judge Patrick Willis presiding. On March 18, Avery was found guilty of first-degree murder and illegal possession of a firearm, and was acquitted on the corpse-mutilation charge. He was sentenced to life in prison without possibility of parole on the murder conviction, plus five years on the weapons charge, to run concurrently.

In 2012, after serving five years at the Wisconsin Secure Program Facility in Boscobel, Avery was transferred to the Waupun Correctional Institution in Waupun.

In January 2016, after Making a Murderer had been released, People magazine reported that one of the Avery trial jurors was the father of a Manitowoc County sheriff's deputy, and another juror's wife was a clerk with Manitowoc County.

Juror Richard Mahler, who was excused from the trial after the jury had begun deliberations because of a family emergency, later commented that early on, seven of the jurors had voted not guilty; he was mystified that the jury eventually agreed on a conviction. Mahler's account has been disputed by other jury members, who claim that no early vote had taken place and that an informal vote was taken with only three jury members voting Avery not guilty.

Another juror allegedly told the Making a Murderer filmmakers they felt intimidated into returning a guilty verdict, fearing for personal safety. The filmmakers' claims have also been disputed.

In 2022, Avery was transferred to Fox Lake Correctional Institution, a medium-security prison.

=== Appeals ===
In August 2011, a state appeals court denied Avery's petition for a new trial, and in 2013, the Wisconsin Supreme Court denied a motion to review the ruling. In January 2016, Chicago attorney Kathleen Zellner, in collaboration with the Midwest Innocence Project, filed a new appeal, citing violations of Avery's due process rights and accusing officials of gathering evidence from properties beyond the scope of their search warrant.

In December 2015, Dassey's attorneys filed a writ of habeas corpus in federal district court for release or retrial, citing constitutional rights violations resulting from ineffective assistance of counsel and the coerced confession. In August 2016, Dassey's conviction was overturned by federal magistrate judge William E. Duffin, who ruled that Dassey's confession was involuntary. Duffin granted a defense petition for Dassey's release on November 14, but the U.S. Court of Appeals for the Seventh Circuit overturned his ruling on November 17, ordering that Dassey remain incarcerated pending resolution of the state's appeal of the habeas decision. He last filed for parole in 2021 but was denied. He is still trying to file for parole.

In June 2017, the Seventh Circuit upheld the magistrate's decision to overturn Dassey's conviction, leaving the state with the options of appealing Duffin's ruling to the U.S. Supreme Court, dismissing the charges, or retrying him. The state then petitioned the appellate court to hear the case en banc. The state's petition was granted, and the appellate court reversed the magistrate's ruling, finding that Dassey's confession did not violate the Constitution. Dassey's attorneys filed a petition to have the Supreme Court hear his case, but the request was denied. Dassey remains in prison.

On August 26, 2016, Zellner filed a motion with the Manitowoc County circuit court for post-conviction scientific testing. Judge Angela Sutkiewicz signed a stipulation and order for the scientific testing to proceed on November 23, 2016.

On June 7, 2017, Zellner filed a 1,272-page post-conviction motion citing ineffective assistance of counsel, Brady violations, and affidavits by experts allegedly debunking the manner in which Halbach was killed, including alleged new evidence and ethical violations by Kratz. Zellner said that Avery's conviction was based on planted evidence and false testimony, and was requesting a new trial "in the interests of justice". On October 3, 2017, Avery's motion for a new trial was summarily denied without the court holding an evidentiary hearing.

On February 26, 2019, the Wisconsin Court of Appeals granted Avery's petition requesting that his case be remanded back to the trial court for an evidentiary hearing on his motion for a new trial. Zellner posted the news to her Twitter page several hours before, tweeting:

Avery Update: We Won!!!!!! Back to the circuit court. #TruthWins @llifeafterten @ZellnerLaw @TManitowoc @michellemalkin #MakingaMurderer.

Based on the bone fragments found in the county gravel pit, Zellner proffered a new theory, based on new evidence, to support Avery's upcoming case. This began in 2018 when she filed a motion to have "suspected human" bones that were being held by the Wisconsin Department of Justice be tested for DNA. The bones came from three different burn piles within the Manitowoc County-owned quarry, and among them was a pelvic-bone fragment. New technology used to identify victims in the California wildfires would allow Zellner, if she had won the appeal, to test the bones for Teresa Halbach's DNA. However, when the motion was filed, Zellner soon discovered that the state had returned the bones to Halbach's family.

By giving them [to the Halbach family] ... they have just confirmed they believe those bones are human.

Zellner went on to file another motion, saying that the return of the bones to the Halbach family constituted an Arizona v. Youngblood violation, which meant that this potentially crucial exculpatory evidence could not be tested.

It's a very sneaky way to get evidence destroyed. It seems very deliberate that the thinking was, 'We need to get rid of those bones, but we can't just go in and cremate them ourselves.'

Zellner's second motion was supported by a "never-before disclosed ledger sheet" indicating that the presence of the bones was not disclosed to Avery's defense team before they were returned to the Halbach family. Zellner had fourteen days to file any "supplemental post conviction motions" before Avery's new court date would be set.

On July 28, 2021, the Court of Appeals for the state of Wisconsin affirmed the Circuit Court's denial of Steven Avery's extensive brief filed by Zellner, claiming the brief contained misrepresentations. On August 16, 2022, Zellner filed a 149-page motion and third motion for post-conviction relief for the Halbach murder. In the motion, Zellner claims to have "new witnesses" that would "provide new and undisputed evidence that directly links Bobby Dassey to the murder of Teresa Halbach". Zellner also alleges the prosecution withheld exculpatory evidence from Avery at trial in violation of his constitutional rights.

=== Petitions ===
On December 20, 2015, a petition was created at a White House petitioning site titled "Investigate and pardon the Averys in Wisconsin and punish the corrupt officials who railroaded these innocent men". In a January 2016 response to the petition, a White House spokesperson said that since Avery and Dassey "are both state prisoners, the President cannot pardon them. A pardon in this case would need to be issued at the state level by the appropriate authorities." A spokesman for then Wisconsin Governor Scott Walker stated that Walker would not pardon Avery.

A second petition, titled "Initiate a Federal Investigation of the Sheriff's Offices of Manitowoc County and Calumet County, Wisconsin", was submitted to the White House petitioning site on January 7, 2016.

== Media coverage ==
On March 26, 2013, the public radio program Radiolab aired an episode titled "Are You Sure?" that featured a 24-minute segment titled "Reasonable Doubt". It explored Avery's story from the perspective of Penny Beerntsen, whom he was wrongfully convicted of sexually assaulting in 1985.

On December 18, 2015, Netflix released Making a Murderer, a ten-episode original documentary series that explores Avery's and Dassey's investigations and trials. The documentary "examines allegations of police and prosecutorial misconduct, evidence tampering and witness coercion". The series was widely reviewed and discussed in the media, and generated numerous follow-up interviews and articles with parties shown in the documentary, including family members and some reporters who covered the trials. A second season of the documentary was released via Netflix on October 19, 2018.

In December 2018, Netflix and series producers were sued for defamation by Andrew Colborn, a former Manitowoc County police officer who had testified at Avery's murder trial. The suit alleges that the series omitted and distorted material to portray Colborn as a corrupt officer who had planted evidence. The suit was later dismissed.

In 2023, The Daily Wire released Convicting a Murderer, produced and hosted by Candace Owens criticizing how the Netflix documentary handled the case.

== Rescinded support and allegations by Jodi Stachowski ==
Jodi Stachowski, an ex-fiancée of Steven Avery, reported in 2016 in an interview with Nancy Grace on HLN that her support for Avery in the documentary was "all an act". She further reported that she personally believes he is "not innocent" in Halbach's murder because "he threatened to kill [her] and [her] family and a friend of [hers]" in the past. She also alleges that Avery had written her threatening letters from prison. She also alleged: "He told me once, excuse my language, all bitches owe him, because [of] the one [Beerntsen] that sent him to prison the first time. ... We all owed him and he could do whatever he wanted. Steven's the one person I can't trust ... he's a monster." She also stated that "he should not be set free".

== See also ==
- List of homicides in Wisconsin
