= Dixmoor 5 =

Group of falsely convicted African American teenagers

The Dixmoor 5 are five African-American men who, as teenagers, were falsely convicted of the November 1991 rape and murder of 14-year-old Cateresa Matthews in Dixmoor, Illinois. At the time of arrest, the defendants, Robert Taylor, Jonathan Barr, James Harden, Robert Lee Veal and Shainne Sharp were all between the ages of 14 and 16.

During high-pressure interviews, three of them gave false confessions leading to convictions for all five. The teens alleged that they were coerced into confessing, claiming they were physically abused and threatened during their interrogations. One of the boys who confessed had an IQ of 56 and developmental disabilities. Two pleaded guilty and testified against the others in exchange for shorter sentences. Both men have since recanted their testimony. Each received at least 80 years in prison.

In 2011, DNA tests connected semen on Cateresa to another man, Willie Randolph, a convicted sex offender who had recently been released on parole. On September 1, 2016, Randolph was charged with the rape and murder of Cateresa Matthews. A suit filed by the five men alleges police withheld exculpatory evidence, including the DNA, from their defense teams. Their convictions were vacated November 3, 2011, and those remaining incarcerated were released.

In 2014, they reached a wrongful conviction settlement with the state of Illinois for $40 million, the largest wrongful conviction settlement in state history.

In 2021, Willie Randolph was acquitted of all charges in the murder of Cateresa Matthews in a bench trial.

On August 20, 2024, Jonathan Barr, one of the Dixmoor 5, was shot to death during a mass shooting in the Back of the Yards neighborhood, in the South Side of Chicago. He was 46 years-old.

== See also ==
- List of wrongful convictions in the United States
- Innocence Project
- Innocent prisoner's dilemma
- Miscarriage of justice
- Overturned convictions in the United States
