= Wisconsin Department of Justice =

Legal entity

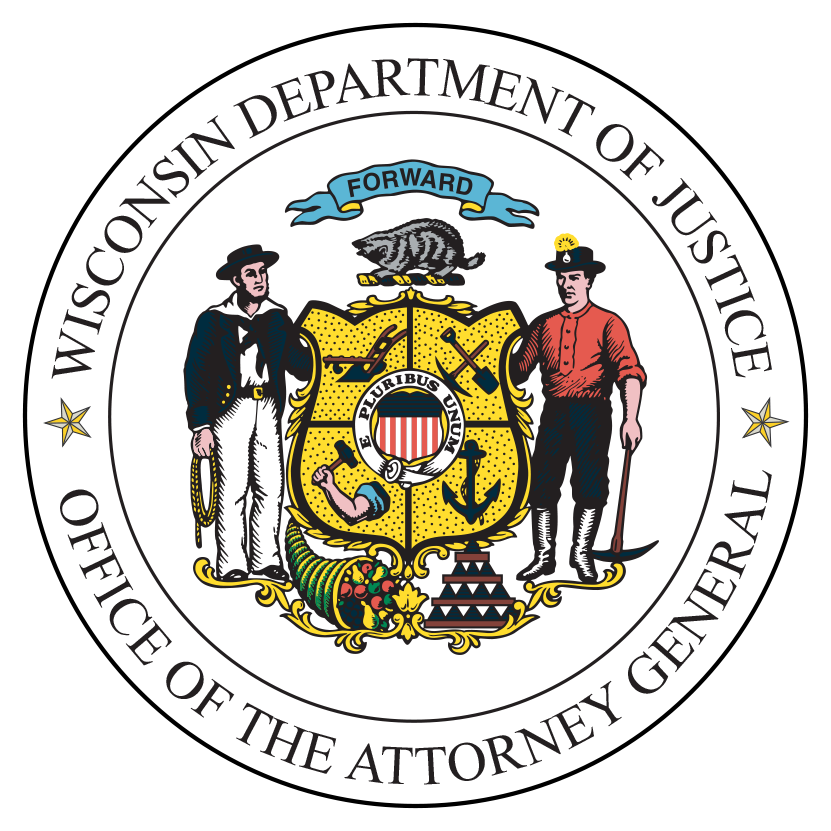

Agency overview
- Jurisdiction: Wisconsin
- Agency executive: Josh Kaul, State Attorney General
- Website: https://www.wisdoj.gov/

The Wisconsin Department of Justice is a state law enforcement agency with jurisdiction throughout the state of Wisconsin. Its headquarters are in Madison, the state capital, with main offices in the Risser Justice Center in downtown Madison. The Attorney General of Wisconsin oversees the agency. The attorney general is Josh Kaul, who was elected to his first four-year term in November, 2018, and assumed the office on January 7, 2019. The WDoJ manages the state's three crime labs, and investigates major crimes involving, among other things, illegal drugs, fugitives, public corruption, official misconduct, organized crime, domestic terrorism, Medicaid fraud and patient abuse.

== Responsibilities ==
The agency provides legal advice and representation, criminal investigation, and other law enforcement services for the state. It represents the state in civil cases and handles criminal cases that reach the Wisconsin Court of Appeals or the Wisconsin Supreme Court. It also represents the state in criminal cases on appeal in federal courts and participates with other states in federal cases that are important to Wisconsin. The department provides legal representation in lower courts when expressly authorized by law or requested by the governor, either house of the legislature, or a state agency head. It also represents state agencies in court reviews of their administrative decisions. The department consists of four divisions and one office: the Division of Criminal Investigation, Division of Law Enforcement Services, Division of Legal Services, Division of Management Services and the Office of Crime Victim Services. The agency also pursues ongoing anti-opioid messaging through the Dose of Reality outreach.

=== Division of Criminal Investigation ===
The Department of Criminal Investigation(DCI) is tasked with investigating crimes statewide that have a larger importance on the state relative to crimes in local principalities. Crimes like this include arson, major financial crimes, homicides, human trafficking, crimes spanning multiple jurisdictions, public integrity, government corruption, among others. These crimes are investigated by DCI Special Agents and criminal analysts while cooperating with local police, tribal, and federal law enforcement officials. There are six offices located throughout the state each with a Special Agent in Charge of the office.

=== Division of Law Enforcement Services ===
The Department of Law Enforcement Services(DLES) is organized into four bureaus. The Bureau of Justice Information and Analysis(BJIA) is responsible for data collection of information relating to crime such as the Uniform Crime Reporting program and the Use of Force and Arrest Related Death program. The Crime Information Bureau(CIB) is responsible for managing programs that are essential to the day to day operations for state and local law enforcement officials throughout the state. These include providing current information for arrest records, concealed carry licenses, warrants, sex offender, and missing persons. The Training and Standards Bureau(TSB) handles the statewide coordination of training for law enforcement officers as well as maintain training and certification records. The Bureau of Justice Programs(BJP) is responsible for giving out contracts and grants to law enforcement agencies throughout the state as well as giving grants towards non-profit organizations.

=== Division of Legal Services ===
The Division of Legal Services provides legal advice and assistance to the governor of the state, other state offices, the state legislature and represents the state in legal matters. The division is split into six units. The Civil Litigation Unit prosecutes civil rights, property rights, administrative and employment law on behalf of the state. The Criminal Appeals Unit represents the state in criminal and some misdemeanor appeals before the Wisconsin Supreme Court, 7th Circuit Court of Appeals, and the United States Supreme Court. The Criminal Litigation Unit prosecutes criminal violations and also provides training to local law enforcement and prosecutors and upon the request of the local district attorney can assist local law enforcement in major felonies. The Medicaid, Fraud Control and Elder Abuse Unit investigates and prosecutes crimes relating to the abuse of elders in nursing homes as well as fraud conducted by service members against the Wisconsin Medicaid program. The Public Protection Unit protects Wisconsin's consumers and its natural resources. One part of the unit handles issues related to unfair or deceptive business practices while another section enforces laws regarding air and water pollution, and hazardous spills. The Special Litigation and Appeals Unit provides legal advice to the state and its agencies and litigates matters relating to constitutional law of the state and governmental authority.

=== Division of Management Services ===
The Division of Management Services is responsible for developing and monitoring the budget of the Department of Justice as well as managing recruitment and payroll of the staff, performs accounting and fiscal control and maintains data security of the department.

=== Office of Crime Victim Services ===
The Office of Crime Victim Services(OCVS) provides assistance to the victims of crimes and administers federal and state funding to similar programs. In addition to direct assistance the OCVS provides financial aid to victims who incur expenses or loss of income as a result of a crime happening to them. The OCVS also operates a victim resource center to aid victims and their questions about their rights and the options available to them. The office also manages the "Safe at Home" program which grants victims of actual or threatened domestic abuse a new residence.

=== State Crime Labs ===
The Wisconsin Department of Justice maintains three state crimes labs, located in Madison, Milwaukee, and Wausau. The lab in Wausau is responsible for the area of northern Wisconsin. The lab located in Milwaukee handles intake from the south eastern part of the state with the counties just outside of Milwaukee County such as Waukesha, Racine, and Ozaukee. The third crime lab in Madison is responsible for all of the counties west of Waukesha and most of the counties in the middle section of Wisconsin.

=== Anti-terrorism ===
In early 2009 the Wisconsin DoJ completed its second Terrorism Liaison Officer's (TLO) training at the Volk Field Air National Guard Base. TLOs are local law enforcement officers, fire fighters, EMS personnel, National Guard personnel, and county emergency managers. The 101 new and existing 61 TLO's have been trained on the most recent terrorism and crime issues, trend analysis, and the proper procedures for receiving and disseminating information to field personnel.

== See also ==
- List of law enforcement agencies in Wisconsin
- Wisconsin Board of Commissioners of Public Lands
