= List of Primetime Creative Arts Emmy Awards received by Netflix =

Category	Wins	Nominations
Program	15	90
Performance	17	146
Individual Achievement	24	24
Casting	15	53
Cinematography	12	51
Costumes	5	24
Directing	13	49
Hairstyling	2	14
Hosting	0	5
Interactive Media	2	6
Main Title Design	1	11
Makeup	1	11
Motion Design	3	3
Music	10	50
Picture Editing	13	41
Production Design	5	24
Sound	9	60
Special Visual Effects	0	10
Stunt Coordination	3	10
Technical Direction	0	1
Writing	13	52
- Totals
Wins	227
Nominations	762

Netflix is an American over-the-top content platform and production company, since 2013 several programs from the platform have been nominated and won both Primetime Emmy Awards and Primetime Creative Arts Emmy Awards, the latter being a part of the former focused on recognizing technical and other similar achievements in American television programming.

The following list focuses only on the categories that are usually included in the Creative Arts ceremony, the ones that are presented on the main ceremony are already covered here.

== Programs ==
Queer Eye has won Outstanding Structured Reality Program six consecutive times (2018–2023). Tidying Up with Marie Kondo scored a nomination in 2019 while Love Is Blind was nominated in 2020.

Outstanding Structured Reality Program
Year	Series	Recipient(s)	Result	Ref.
2018	Queer Eye	David Collins, Michael Williams, Rob Eric, Jennifer Lane, Adam Sher, David George, David Eilenberg, Jordana Hochman, Mark Bracero and Rachelle Mendez	Won	
2019	Queer Eye	David Collins, Michael Williams, Rob Eric, Jennifer Lane, Adam Sher, David George, David Eilenberg, Jordana Hochman, Mark Bracero and Rachelle Mendez	Won	
2020	Queer Eye	David Collins, Michael Williams, Rob Eric, Jennifer Lane, Adam Sher, David George, David Eilenberg, Jordana Hochman, Mark Bracero and Rachelle Mendez	Won	
2019	Tidying Up with Marie Kondo	Gail Berman, Joe Earley, Marie Kondo, Takumi Kawahara, Hend Baghdady, Bianca Barnes-Williams, Heather Crowe, Scott Mlodzinski and Ian Samplin	Nominated	
2020	Love Is Blind	Chris Coelen, Sam Dean, Ally Simpson, Eric Detwiler, Brian Smith, Stefanie Cohen Williams, Brent Gauches and Jeff Keirns	Nominated	

Somebody Feed Phil was nominated for its second season in 2019 while Cheer and Kevin Hart: Don't F**k This Up were nominated in 2020 with the former winning.

Outstanding Unstructured Reality Program
Year	Series	Recipient(s)	Result	Ref.
2019	Somebody Feed Phil	Rich Rosenthal, John Bedolis, Phil Rosenthal, Christopher Collins, Lydia Tenaglia, Joe Caterini and Shawn Cuddy	Nominated	
2020	Cheer	Greg Whiteley, Andrew Fried, Dane Lillegard, Jasper Thomlinson, Bert Hamelinck, Adam Leibowitz, Arielle Kilker and Chelsea Yarnell	Won	
2020	Kevin Hart: Don't F**k This Up	Kevin Hart, Dave Becky, Angus Wall, Russell Heldt, Casey Kriley, Alexandra Marks, Rich Eckersley, Allison Klein, Kent Kubena, Terry Leonard and Jennifer Sofio Hall	Nominated	

Five documentaries from Netflix have been nominated for Exceptional Merit in Documentary Filmmaking with Strong Island winning in 2018.

Exceptional Merit in Documentary Filmmaking
Year	Series	Recipient(s)	Result	Ref.
2014	Brave Miss World	Lati Grobman, Cecilia Peck, Inbal B. Lessner and Motty Reif	Nominated	
2015	Hot Girls Wanted	Jill Bauer, Ronna Gradus and Rashida Jones	Nominated	
2016	Winter on Fire: Ukraine's Fight for Freedom	Lati Grobman, David Dinerstein, Evgeny Afineevsky and Den Tolmor	Nominated	
2017	The White Helmets	Joanna Natasegara	Nominated	
2018	Strong Island	Joslyn Barnes and Yance Ford	Won	

My Next Guest Needs No Introduction with David Letterman was nominated for its first two seasons while Comedians in Cars Getting Coffee received nominations for seasons ten and eleven.

Outstanding Hosted Nonfiction Series or Special
Year	Series	Recipient(s)	Result	Ref.
2018	My Next Guest Needs No Introduction with David Letterman	Justin Wilkes, Dave Sirulnick, Jon Kamen, Tom Keaney, Louise Shelton, Aaron Bergeron and Mary Barclay	Nominated	
2019	My Next Guest Needs No Introduction with David Letterman	Chris Cechin-De La Rosa, Lydia Tenaglia, Tom Keaney, Sandra Zweig, Mary Barclay, Michael Steed and Helen Cho	Nominated	
2019	Comedians in Cars Getting Coffee	Jerry Seinfeld, George Shapiro, Tammy Johnston and Melissa Miller	Nominated	
2020	Comedians in Cars Getting Coffee	Jerry Seinfeld, Tammy Johnston, George Shapiro and Denis Jensen	Nominated	
2020	Ugly Delicious	David Chang, Morgan Neville, Dara Horenblas, Christopher Chen, Caryn Capotosto, Blake Davis and Chris Ying	Nominated	

Out of the last five years, Netflix has won three times for Outstanding Documentary or Nonfiction Series; Making a Murderer (2016), Wild Wild Country (2018), and Our Planet (2019). Chef's Table was nominated for seasons two, three, and five while The Keepers and Tiger King: Murder, Mayhem, and Madness were also nominated.

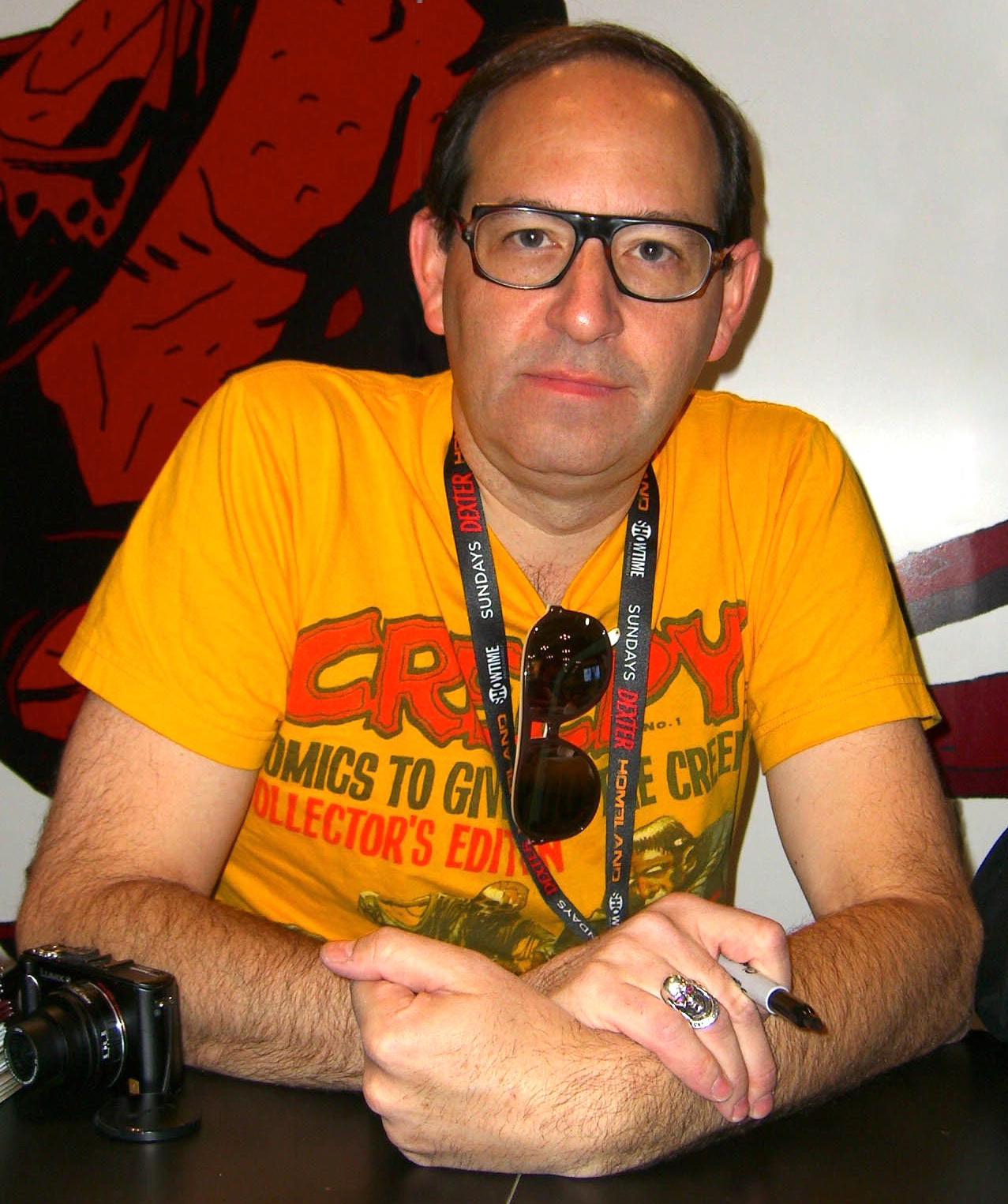
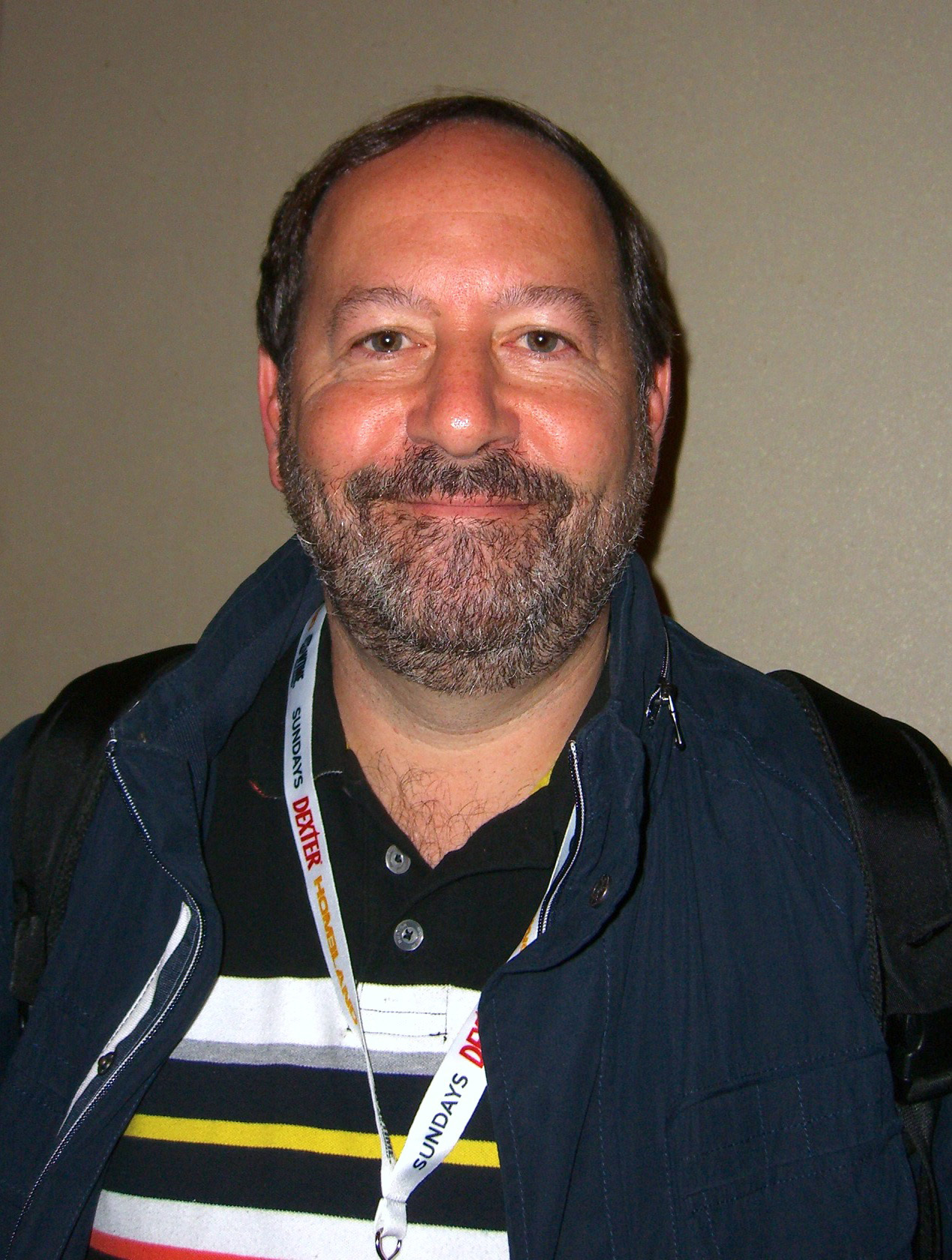
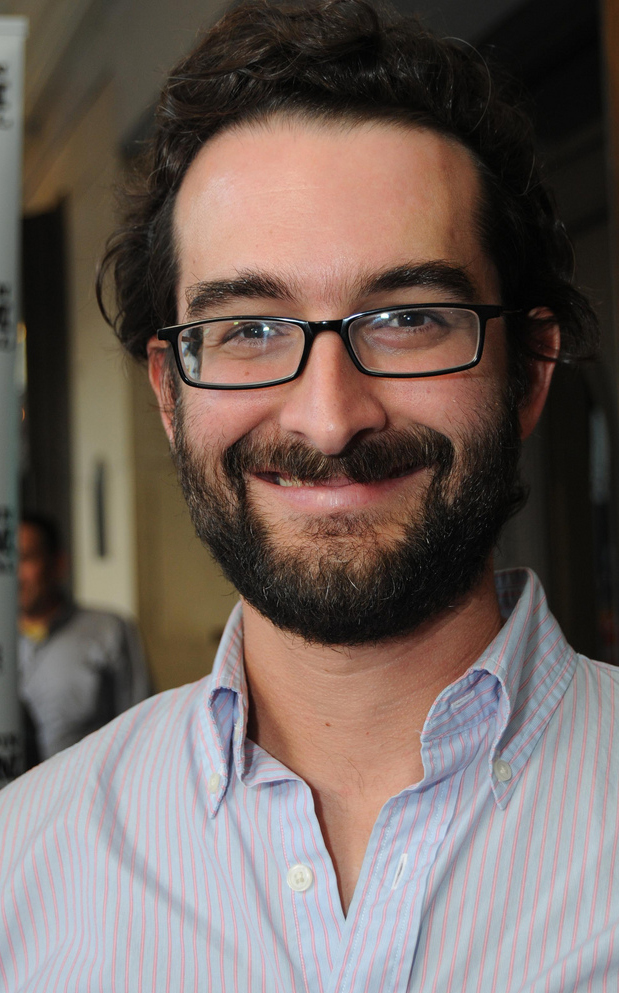
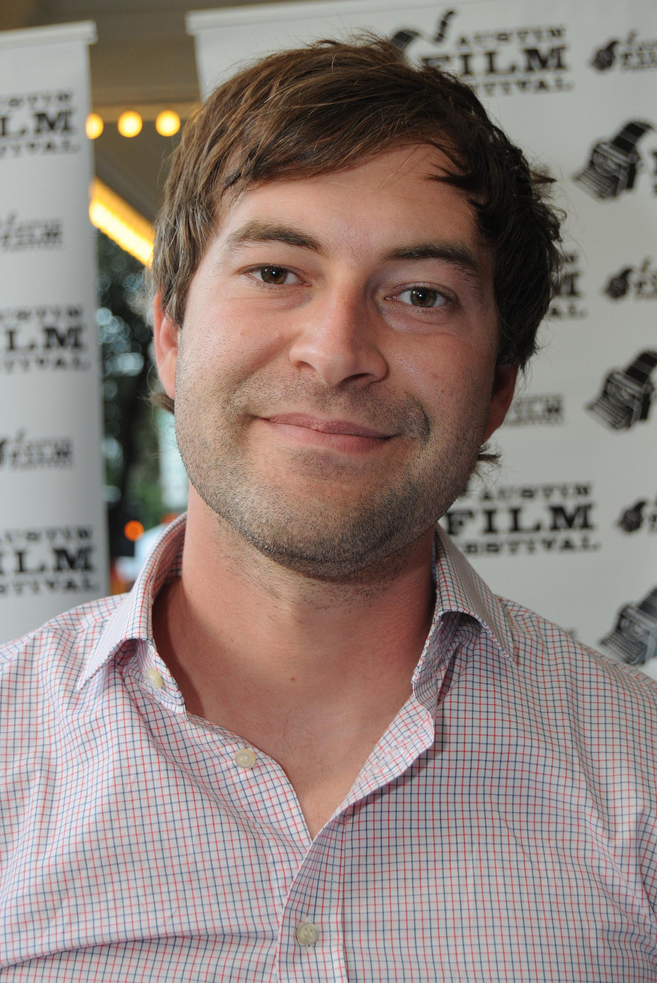
Dan Braun, Josh Braun, Jay Duplass and Mark Duplass, producers of 2018's winning documentary Wild Wild Country.

Outstanding Documentary or Nonfiction Series
Year	Series	Recipient(s)	Result	Ref.
2016	Making a Murderer	Laura Ricciardi and Moira Demos	Won	
2016	Chef's Table	David Gelb, Andrew Fried, Brian McGinn, Matthew Weaver and Dane Lillegard	Nominated	
2017	Chef's Table	David Gelb, Andrew Fried, Brian McGinn, Matthew Weaver and Dane Lillegard	Nominated	
2019	Chef's Table	David Gelb, Andrew Fried, Brian McGinn, Matthew Weaver and Dane Lillegard	Nominated	
2017	The Keepers	Jessica Hargrave, Ryan White, Josh Braun, Matthew Goldberg and Brandon Carroll	Nominated	
2018	Wild Wild Country	Mark Duplass, Jay Duplass, Josh Braun, Dan Braun, Juliana Lembi, Chapman Way and Maclain Way,	Won	
2019	Our Planet	Sophie Lanfear, Alastair Fothergill and Keith Scholey	Won	
2020	Tiger King: Murder, Mayhem, and Madness	Chris Smith, Fisher Stevens, Eric Goode and Rebecca Chaiklin	Nominated	

In 2014, The Square was the first Netflix documentary to be nominated for Outstanding Documentary or Nonfiction Special. In 2015, Virunga scored a nomination while What Happened, Miss Simone? was the first documentary film to win in 2016. In 2017, Amanda Knox was nominated; 13th won the award. In 2018, Icarus and Jim & Andy: The Great Beyond were nominated. The following year, Fyre: The Greatest Party That Never Happened was nominated. The most recent documentary films to be nominated for the award are Becoming and The Great Hack.

Outstanding Documentary or Nonfiction Special
Year	Series	Recipient(s)	Result	Ref.
2014	The Square	Jodie Evans, Lekha Singh, Sarah E. Johnson, Mike Lerner, Gavin Dougan, Karim Amer and Jehane Noujaim	Nominated	
2015	Virunga	Leonardo DiCaprio, Howard G. Buffett, Maxyne Franklin, Jess Search, Jon Drever, Orlando von Einsiedel and Joanna Natasegara	Nominated	
2016	What Happened, Miss Simone?	Sidney Beaumont, Amy Hobby, Liz Garbus, Justin Wilkes and Jayson Jackson	Won	
2017	13th	Angus Wall, Jason Sterman, Spencer Averick, Ava DuVernay and Howard Barish	Won	
2017	Amanda Knox	Mette Heide, Rod Blackhurst, Brian McGinn and Stephen Robert Morse	Nominated	
2018	Icarus	Bryan Fogel, Dan Cogan, David Fialkow and Jim Swartz	Nominated	
2018	Jim & Andy: The Great Beyond	Shane Smith, Eddy Moretti, Nicole Montez, Tony Clifton, Spike Jonze, Danny Gabai and Chris Smith	Nominated	
2019	Fyre: The Greatest Party That Never Happened	Danny Gabai, Chris Smith, Mick Purzycki, Gabrielle Bluestone	Nominated	
2020	Becoming	Lauren Cioffi, Katy Chevigny, Marilyn Ness, Priya Swaminathan and Tonia Davis	Nominated	
2020	The Great Hack	Judy Korin, Pedro Kos, Karim Amer, Geralyn White Dreyfous, Nina Fialkow, Lyn Davis Lear and Mike Lerner	Nominated	

In 2017, Netflix debuted in the category with the specials Louis C.K. 2017 and Sarah Silverman: A Speck of Dust. The following year, Steve Martin & Martin Short: An Evening You Will Forget for the Rest of Your Life was nominated while Dave Chappelle: Equanimity won. In 2019, the streaming service scored four nominations in the category; Hannah Gadsby: Nanette, Homecoming: A Film by Beyoncé, Springsteen on Broadway, and Wanda Sykes: Not Normal. In 2020, out of five nominated specials, Dave Chappelle: Sticks & Stones won.

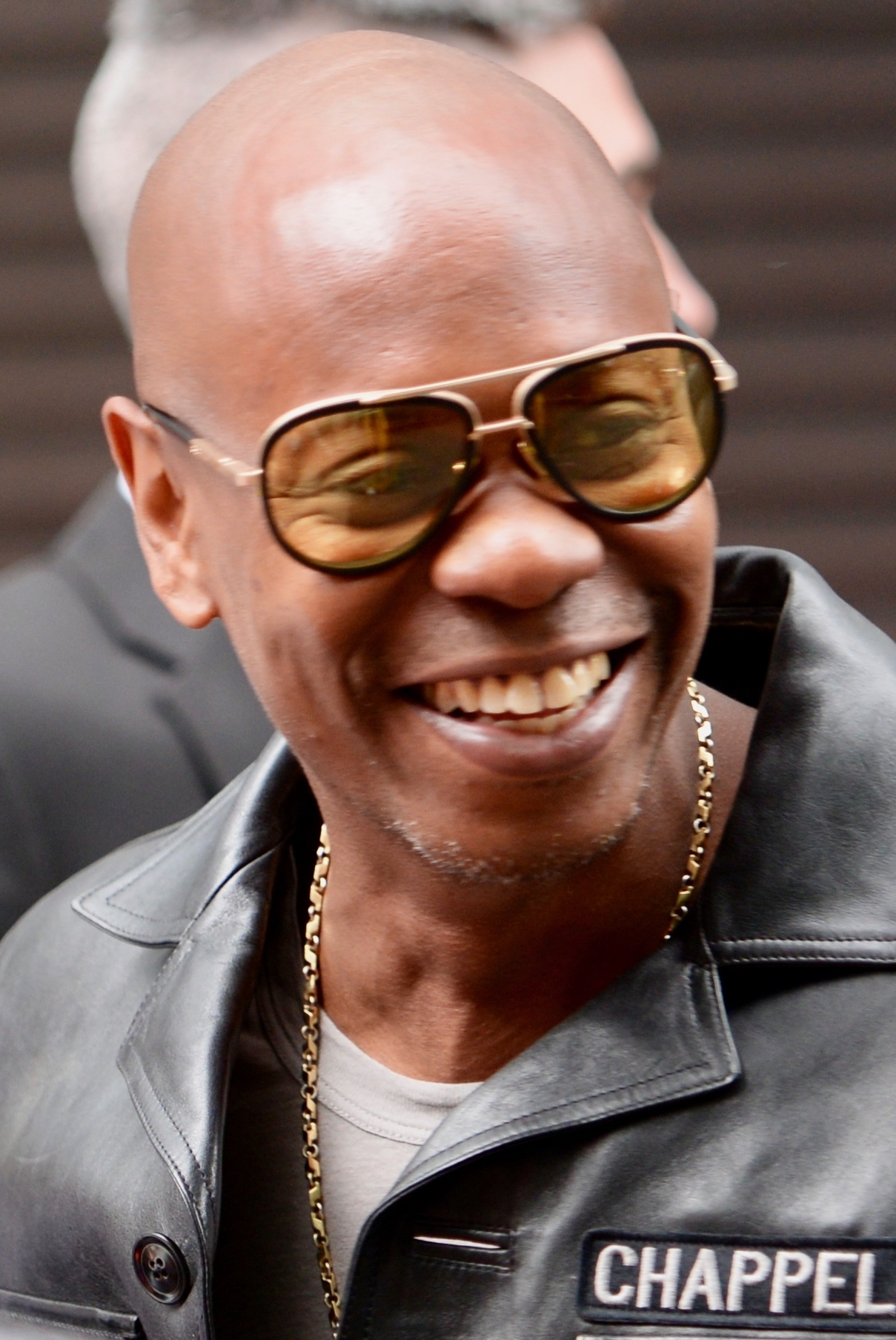
Dave Chappelle won twice for his stand-up comedy specials Dave Chappelle: Equanimity (2018) and Dave Chappelle: Sticks & Stones (2020).

Outstanding Variety Special (Pre-Recorded)
Year	Series	Recipient(s)	Result	Ref.
2017	Louis C.K. 2017	Louis C.K., Dave Becky, Mike Berkowitz, Tony Hernandez, Ryan Cunningham and John Skidmore	Nominated	
2017	Sarah Silverman: A Speck of Dust	Sarah Silverman; Amy Zvi, Nicholas Veneroso, Daniel Kellison and Mickey Meyer	Nominated	
2018	Dave Chappelle: Equanimity	Dave Chappelle, Stan Lathan and Rikki Hughes	Won	
2018	Steve Martin & Martin Short: An Evening You Will Forget for the Rest of Your Life	Lorne Michaels, Steve Martin, Martin Short, Marc Gurvitz, Erin David, Marcus Raboy and Neal Marshall	Nominated	
2019	Hannah Gadsby: Nanette	Kevin Whyte, Kathleen McCarthy, Frank Bruzzese and Hannah Gadsby,	Nominated	
2019	Homecoming: A Film by Beyoncé	Beyoncé Knowles-Carter, Steve Pamon, Erinn Williams and Ed Burke	Nominated	
2019	Springsteen on Broadway	Bruce Springsteen, Jon Landau, George Travis and Thom Zimny	Nominated	
2019	Wanda Sykes: Not Normal	Wanda Sykes and Page Hurwitz	Nominated	
2020	Dave Chappelle: Sticks & Stones	Dave Chappelle, Stan Lathan, Rikki Hughes and Sina Sadighi	Won	
2020	Hannah Gadsby: Douglas	Hannah Gadsby, Kevin Whyte, Kathleen McCarthy, John Irwin, Casey Spira and Jenney Shamash	Nominated	
2020	Jerry Seinfeld: 23 Hours to Kill	Jerry Seinfeld, George Shapiro, Tammy Johnston, Michael Davies, Denis Jensen and Melissa Miller	Nominated	
2020	John Mulaney & the Sack Lunch Bunch	John Mulaney, Marika Sawyer, Rhys Thomas, David Miner, Cara Masline, Ravi Nandan, Inman Young, Dave Ferguson, Corey Deckler, Mary Beth Minthorn and Kerri Hundley	Nominated	
2020	Tiffany Haddish: Black Mitzvah	Tiffany Haddish, Page Hurwitz and Wanda Sykes	Nominated	

Both Big Mouth and BoJack Horseman have been nominated twice for Outstanding Animated Program in 2019 and 2020.

Outstanding Animated Program
Year	Series	Episode	Recipient(s)	Result	Ref.
2019	BoJack Horseman	"Free Churro"	Raphael Bob-Waksberg, Noel Bright, Steven A. Cohen, Will Arnett, Aaron Paul, Peter A. Knight, Elijah Aron, Kate Purdy, Lisa Hanawalt, Joanna Calo, Kelly Galuska, Nick Adams, Alex Bulkley, Corey Campodonico, Richard Choi, Mike Hollingsworth, Amy Winfrey, Peter Merryman, Anne Walker Farrell and Adam Parton	Nominated	
2020	BoJack Horseman	"The View from Halfway Down"	Raphael Bob-Waksberg, Noel Bright, Steven A. Cohen, Will Arnett, Aaron Paul, Joanna Calo, Lisa Hanawalt, Mike Hollingsworth, Nick Adams, Shauna McGarry, Alex Bulkley, Corey Campodonico, Eric Blyler, Richard Choi, Amy Winfrey, Alison Tafel, Christopher Nance, Yair Gordon and Karl Pajak	Nominated	
2019	Big Mouth	"The Planned Parenthood Show"	Nick Kroll, Andrew Goldberg, Mark J. Levin, Jennifer Flackett, Joe Wengert, Ben Kalina, Chris Prynoski, Shannon Prynoski, Anthony Lioi, Gil Ozeri, Kelly Galuska, Nate Funaro, Emily Altman, Bryan Francis, Mike L. Mayfield, Jerilyn Blair, Bill Buchanan, Sean Dempsey and Jamie Huang	Nominated	
2020	Big Mouth	"Disclosure: The Move: The Musical!	Nick Kroll, Andrew Goldberg, Mark J. Levin, Jennifer Flackett, Joe Wengert, Kelly Galuska, Gil Ozeri, Ben Kalina, Shannon Prynoski, Chris Prynoski, Anthony Lioi, Mike L. Mayfield, Nate Funaro, Emily Altman, Victor Quinaz, Bob Suarez, David Bastian, Edgar Larrazabal, Maureen Mlynarczyk and Juli Murphy	Nominated	

In 2019, Love, Death & Robots won Outstanding Short Form Animated Program.

Outstanding Short Form Animated Program
Year	Series	Episode	Recipient(s)	Result	Ref.
2019	Love, Death & Robots	"The Witness"	David Fincher, Tim Miller, Jennifer Miller, Joshua Donen, Victoria Howard, Gennie Rim, Alberto Mielgo and Gabriele Pennacchioli	Won	

Jim Henson's The Dark Crystal: Age of Resistance won Outstanding Children's Program in 2020.

Outstanding Children's Program
Year	Series	Recipient(s)	Result	Ref.
2018	Alexa & Katie	Matthew Carlson, Heather Wordham, Gary Murphy and Bob Heath	Nominated	
2018	Fuller House	Jeff Franklin, Thomas L. Miller, Robert L. Boyett, Marsh McCall, Bryan Behar and Steve Baldikoski	Nominated	
2018	A Series of Unfortunate Evenets	Daniel Handler, Neil Patrick Harris, Rose Lam, Barry Sonnenfeld and Jon Weber	Nominated	
2019	A Series of Unfortunate Evenets	Daniel Handler, Neil Patrick Harris, Rose Lam, Barry Sonnenfeld, Joe Tracz and Rand Geiger	Nominated	
2019	Carmen Sandiego	Caroline Fraser, CJ Kettler, Kirsten Newlands, Anne Loi, Duane Capizzi and Brian Hulme	Nominated	
2020	Jim Henson's The Dark Crystal: Age of Resistance	Lisa Henson, Halle Stanford, Louis Leterrier, Jeffrey Addiss, Will Matthews, Javier Grillo-Marxuach, Blanca Lista and Ritamarie Peruggi	Won	

In 2019, It's Bruno! and Special were nominated.

Outstanding Short Form Comedy or Drama Series
Year	Series	Recipient(s)	Result	Ref.
2019	It's Bruno!	Solvan "Slick" Naim, Molly Conners, Amanda Bowers and Vincent Morano	Nominated	
2019	Special	Jim Parsons, Todd Spiewak, Eric Norsoph, Ryan O'Connell and Anna Dokoza	Nominated	

In 2020, Between Two Ferns with Zach Galifianakis: The Movie, Sorta Uncut Interviews was nominated.

Outstanding Short Form Variety Series
Year	Series	Recipient(s)	Result	Ref.
2020	Between Two Ferns with Zach Galifianakis: The Movie, Sorta Uncut Interviews	Scott Aukerman, Zach Galifianakis, Mike Farah, Caitlin Daley and Corinne Eckart	Nominated	

== Acting ==
=== Guest Actor ===
In 2014, Reg E. Cathey was nominated for House of Cards. The following year, he won in the category for the same role. For season two of Orange Is the New Black, Pablo Schreiber, received the only nomination for the series in the guest actor category. House of Cards continued to dominate the guest acting field adding Mahershala Ali and Paul Sparks. After winning an Emmy for Outstanding Supporting Actor in a Drama Series for Bloodline, Ben Mendelsohn was nominated in the guest category for the final season of the series. In 2018, Cameron Britton, from Mindhunter, and Matthew Goode, from The Crown, were nominated.

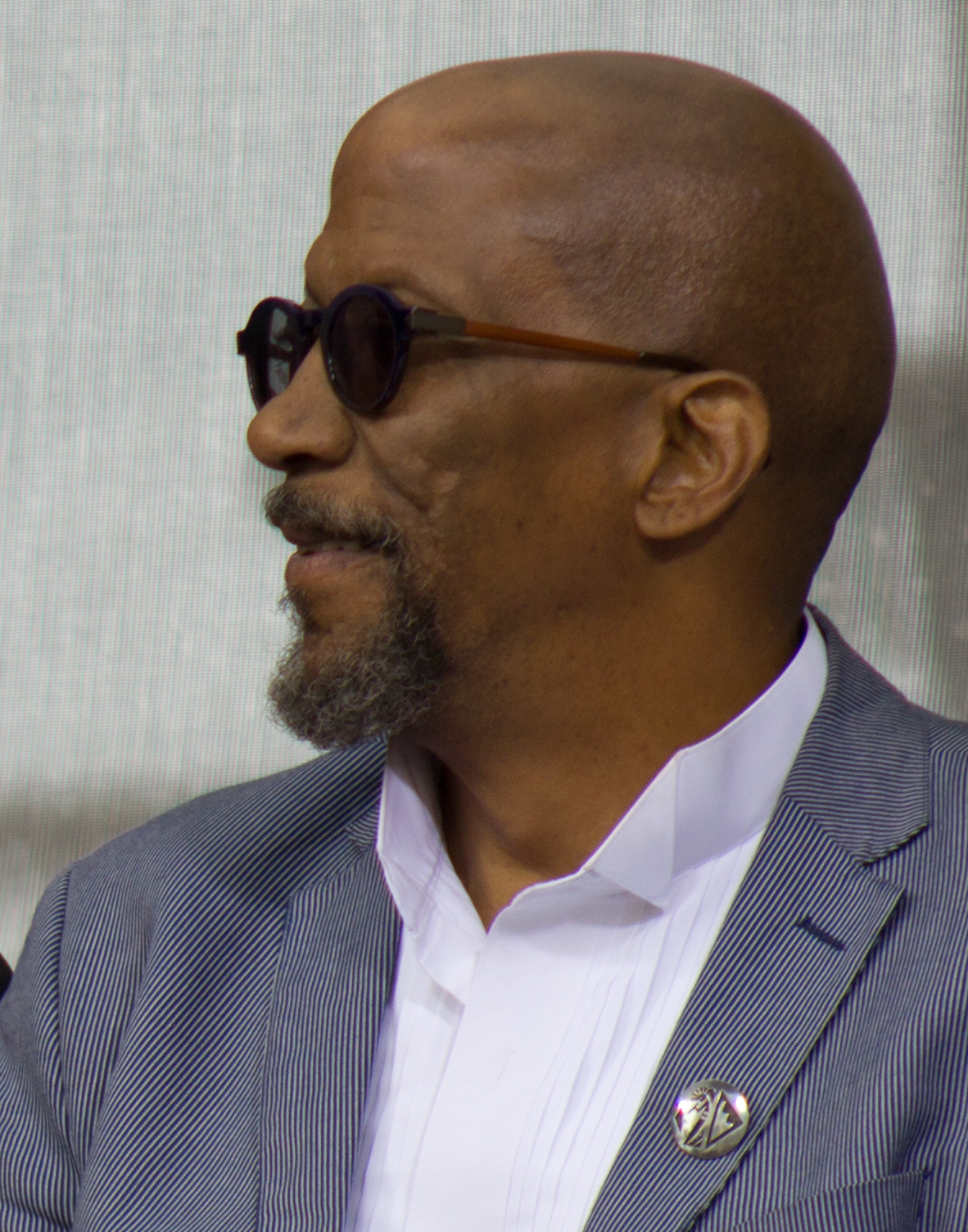
Reg E. Cathey was nominated three times for House of Cards, winning once in 2015.

Outstanding Guest Actor in a Drama Series
Year	Series	Character	Actor	Result	Ref.
2014	House of Cards	Freddy Hayes	Reg E. Cathey	Nominated	
2015	Orange Is the New Black	George "Pornstache" Mendez	Pablo Schreiber	Nominated	
2015	House of Cards	Freddy Hayes	Reg E. Cathey	Won	
2016	House of Cards	Freddy Hayes	Reg E. Cathey	Nominated	
2016	House of Cards	Remy Danton	Mahershala Ali	Nominated	
2016	House of Cards	Thomas Yates	Paul Sparks	Nominated	
2017	Bloodline	Danny Rayburn	Ben Mendelsohn	Nominated	
2018	Mindhunter	Edmund Kemper	Cameron Britton	Nominated	
2018	The Crown	Antony Armstrong-Jones	Matthew Goode	Nominated	
2020	Black Mirror: Smithereens	Chris Gillhaney	Andrew Scott	Nominated	

Netflix's only nomination for Outstanding Guest Actor in a Comedy Series was in 2015 for Jon Hamm in Unbreakable Kimmy Schmidt.

Outstanding Guest Actor in a Comedy Series
Year	Series	Character	Acor	Result	Ref.
2015	Unbreakable Kimmy Schmidt	Reverend Richard Wayne Gary Wayne	Jon Hamm	Nominated	

=== Guest Actress ===
House of Cards is the Netflix original with the most nominations in the category with four; Kate Mara in 2014, Rachel Brosnahan in 2015, and Ellen Burstyn and Molly Parker in 2016. In 2017, Shannon Purser received a nomination for Stranger Things. For Orange Is the New Black, Laverne Cox was nominated in 2017, 2018, and 2020.

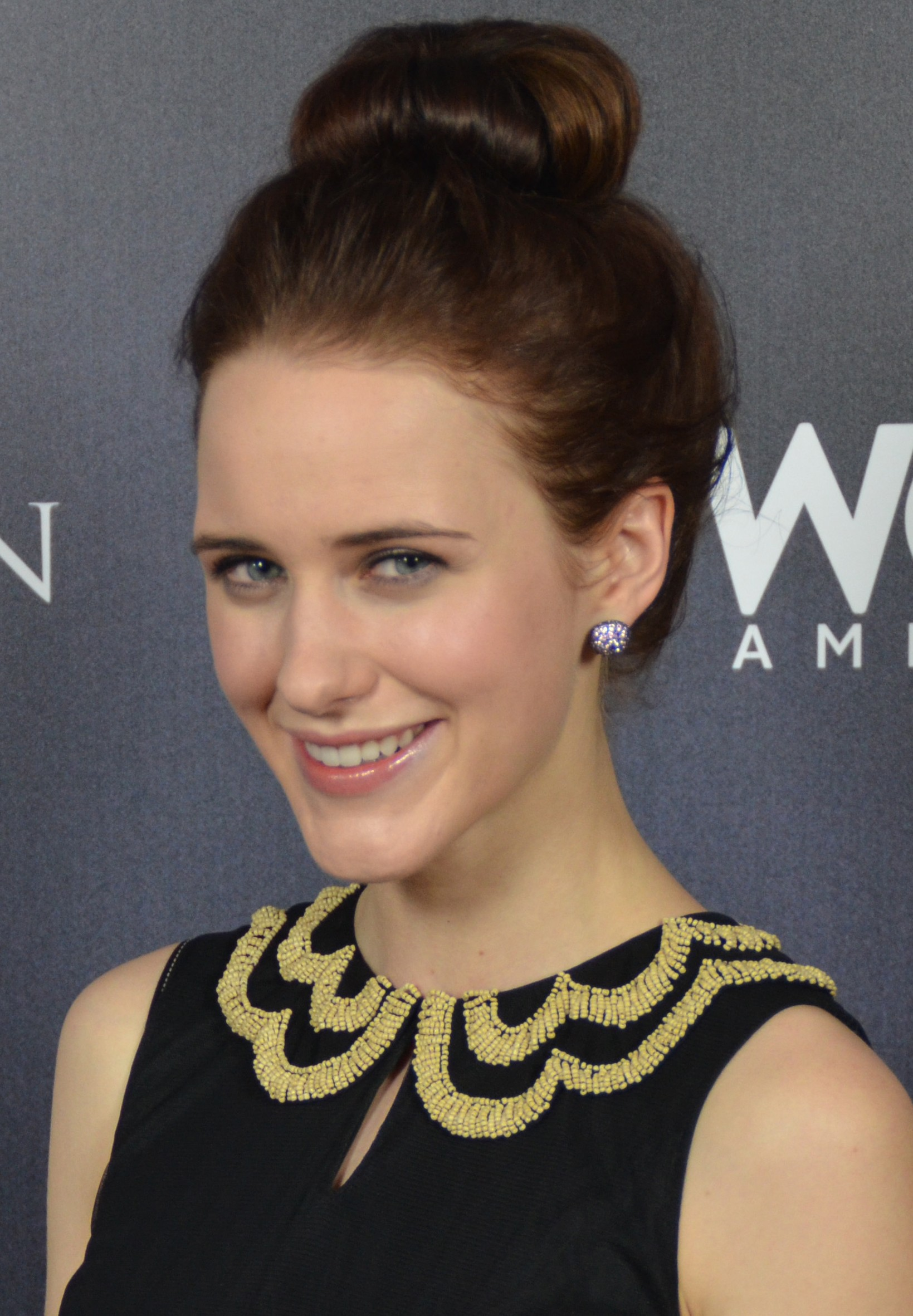
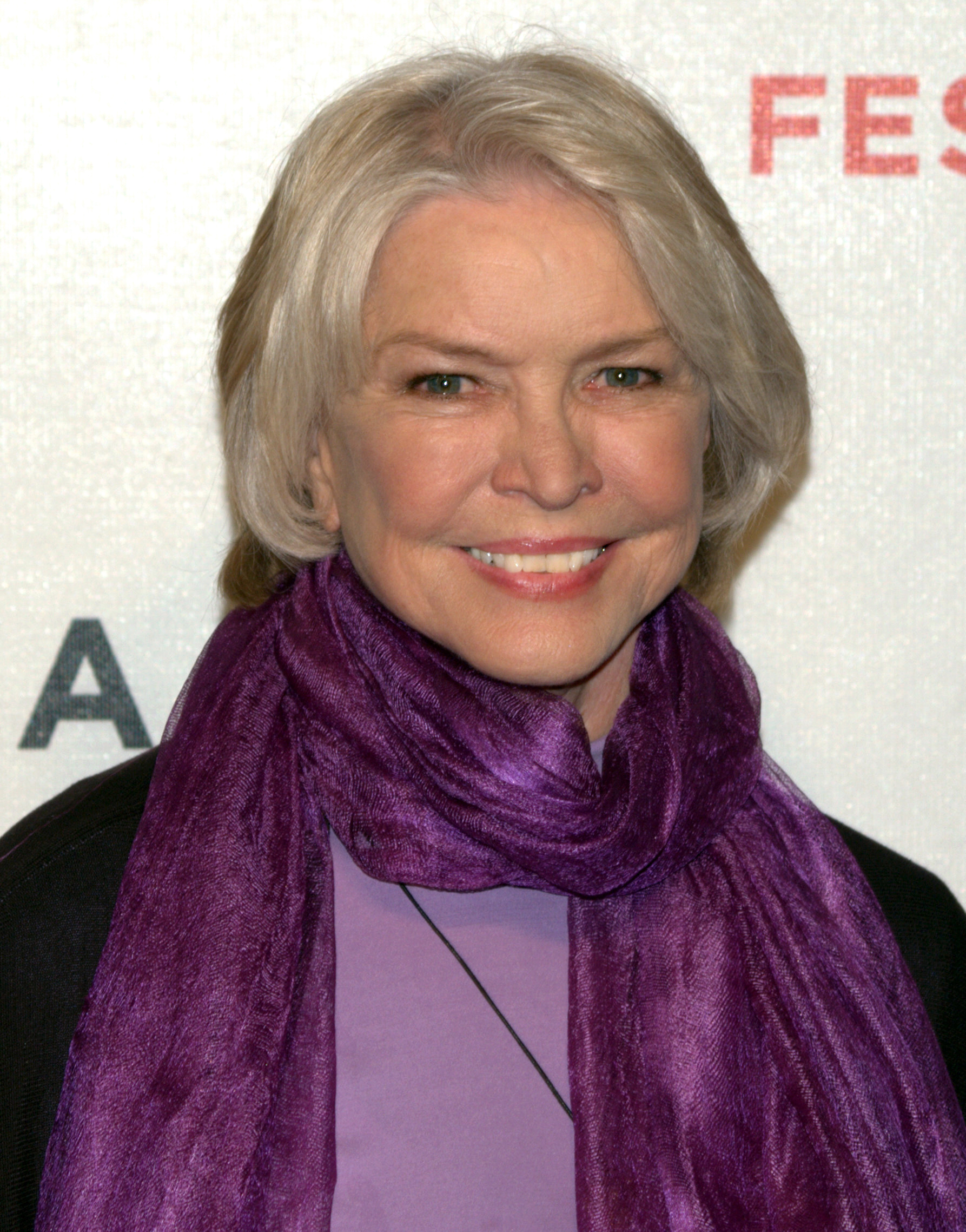
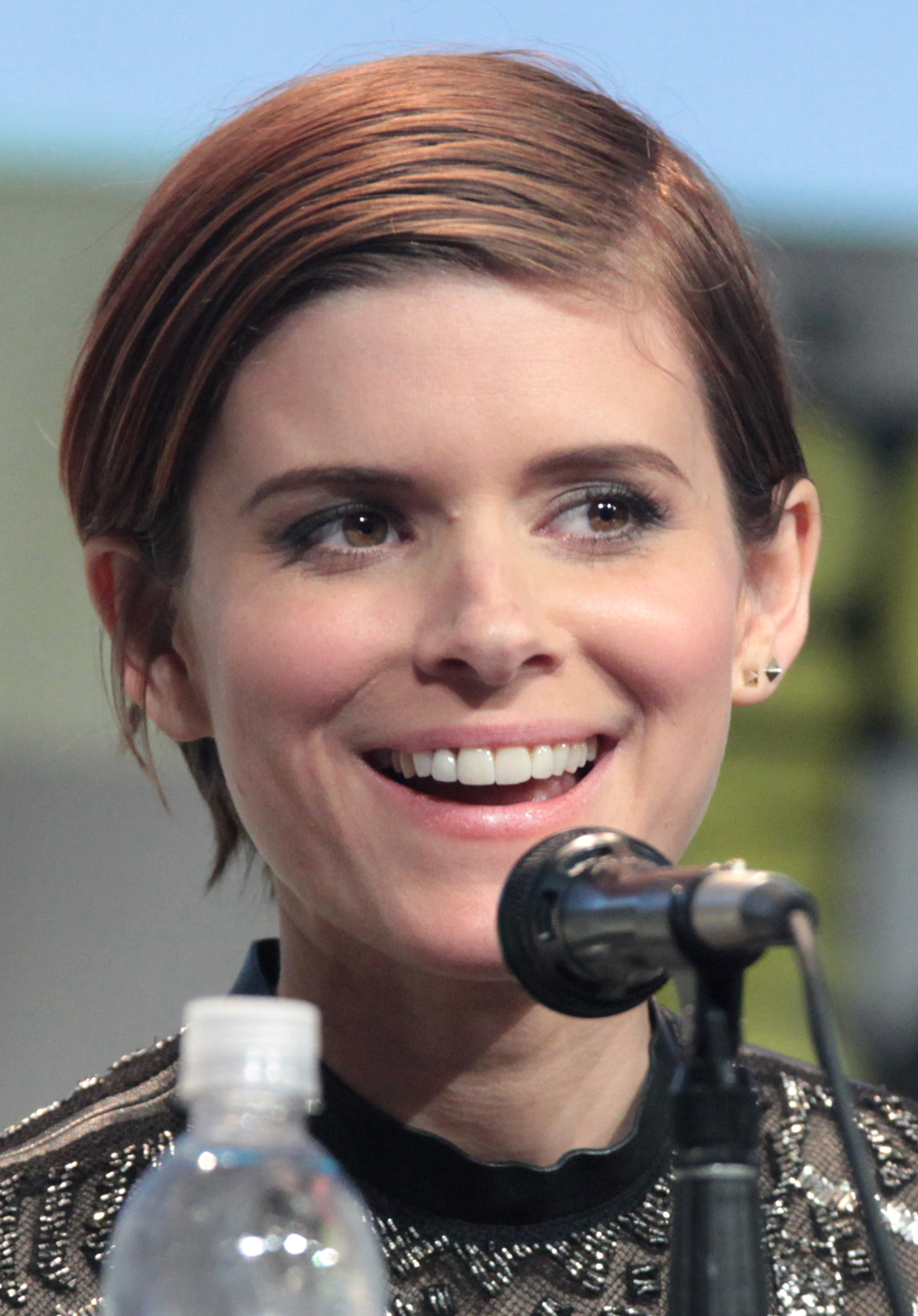
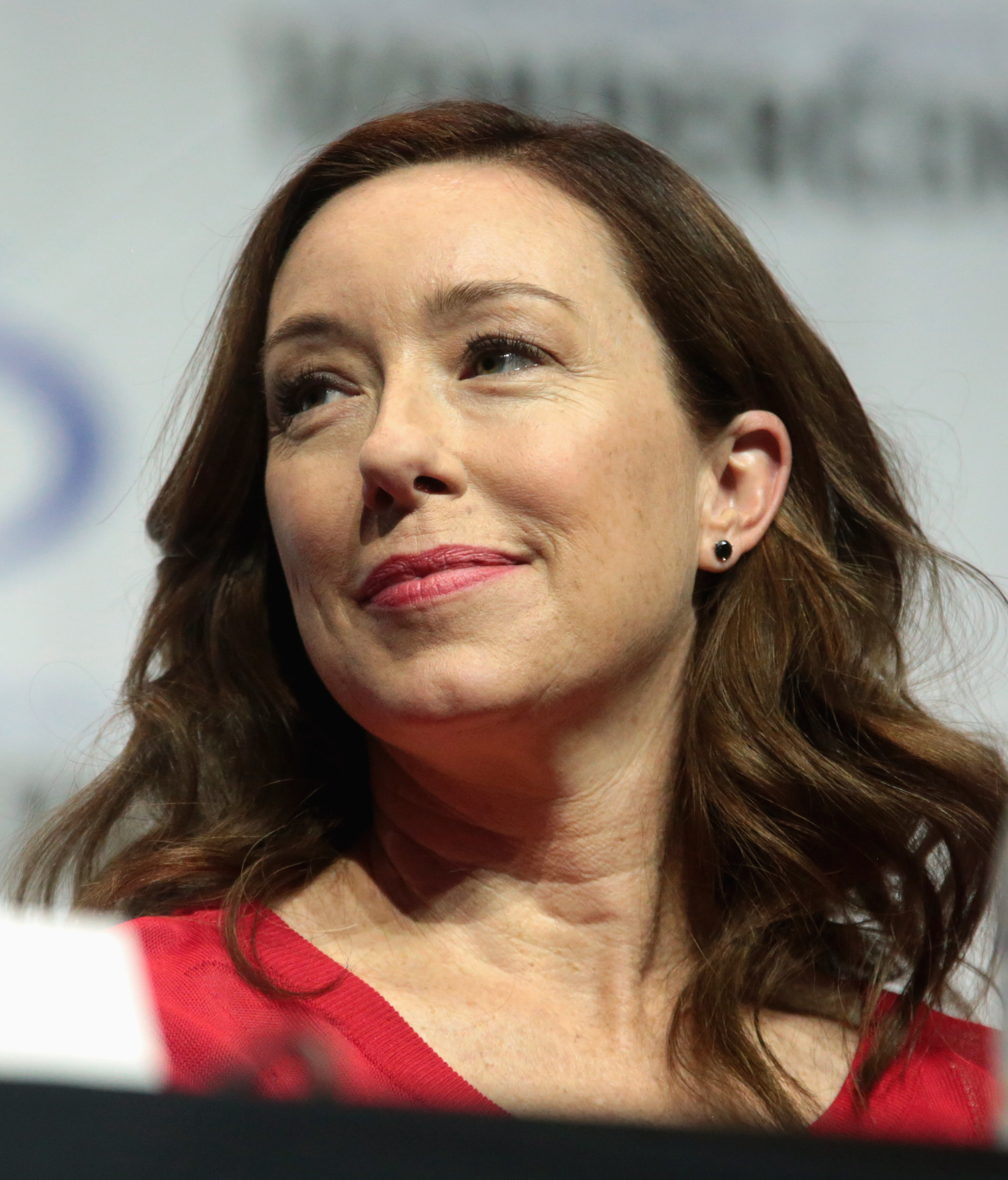
Rachel Brosnahan, Ellen Burstyn, Kate Mara, and Molly Parker were all nominated for House of Cards.

Outstanding Guest Actress in a Drama Series
Year	Series	Character	Actress	Result	Ref.
2014	House of Cards	Zoe Barnes	Kate Mara	Nominated	
2015	House of Cards	Rachel Posner	Rachel Brosnahan	Nominated	
2016	House of Cards	Elizabeth Hale	Ellen Burstyn	Nominated	
2016	House of Cards	Jackie Sharp	Molly Parker	Nominated	
2017	Stranger Things	Barb Holland	Shannon Purser	Nominated	
2017	Orange Is the New Black	Sophia Burset	Laverne Cox	Nominated	
2020	Orange Is the New Black	Sophia Burset	Laverne Cox	Nominated	
2021	Orange Is the New Black	Sophia Burset	Laverne Cox	Nominated	

In 2014, Orange Is the New Black's Uzo Aduba won her first Emmy for playing Suzanne "Crazy Eyes" Warren for the first season while Natasha Lyonne and Laverne Cox were also nominated for the same season; Cox became the first transgender woman to be nominated for an Emmy Award. The following year, Tina Fey was nominated for her guest role in Unbreakable Kimmy Schmidt while Angela Bassett was nominated for her performance in Master of None in 2017.

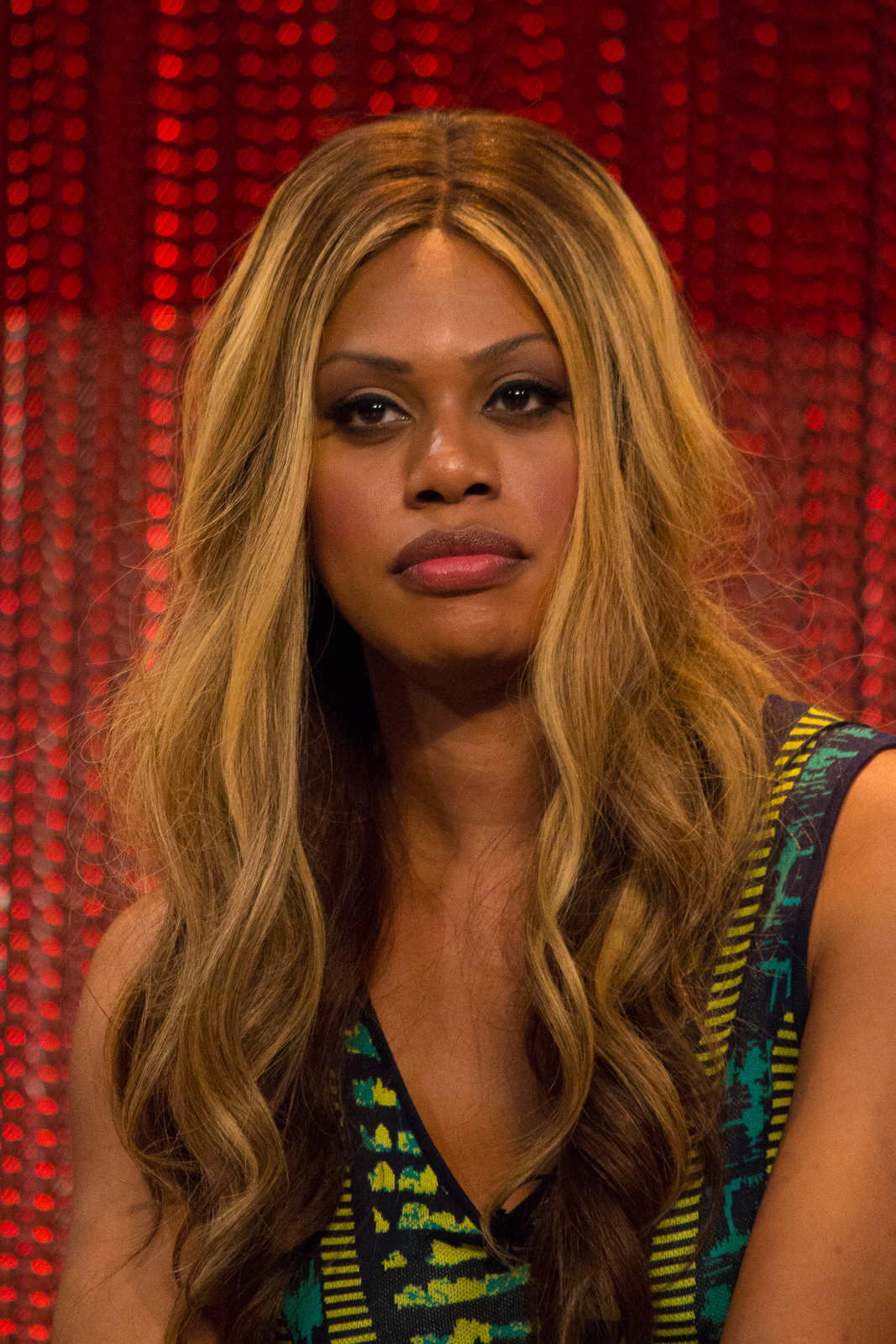
Laverne Cox became the first transgender person to be nominated for an Emmy in 2014.

Outstanding Guest Actress in a Comedy Series
Year	Series	Character	Actress	Result	Ref.
2014	Orange Is the New Black	Suzanne "Crazy Eyes" Warren	Uzo Aduba	Won	
2014	Orange Is the New Black	Sophia Burset	Laverne Cox	Nominated	
2014	Orange Is the New Black	Nicky Nichols	Natasha Lyonne	Nominated	
2015	Unbreakable Kimmy Schmidt	Marcia	Tina Fey	Nominated	
2017	Master of None	Catherine	Angela Bassett	Nominated	
2020	The Politician	Hadassah Gold	Bette Midler	Nominated	

=== Short Form ===
In 2019, sixth-place finisher Ryan O'Connell became the fifth nominee in the category after Jonathan Banks' nomination was revoked. It was determined that several episodes were shorter than two minutes, violating the Academy of Television Arts & Sciences' rule that six episodes air during the eligibility period with a runtime of at least two minutes.

Outstanding Actor in a Short Form Comedy or Drama Series
Year	Series	Character	Actor	Result	Ref.
2019	Special	Ryan Hayes	Ryan O'Connell	Nominated	

In 2019, Special scored two nominations in the category with actresses Jessica Hecht and Punam Patel, for the first season of the series.

Outstanding Actress in a Short Form Comedy or Drama Series
Year	Series	Character	Actress	Result	Ref.
2019	Special	Karen Hayes	Jessica Hecht	Nominated	
2019	Special	Kim Laghari	Punam Patel	Nominated	

=== Voice-Over Performance and Narrator ===
In 2020, Maya Rudolph won for her role at Connie the Hormone Monstress in Big Mouth.

Outstanding Character Voice-Over Performance
Year	Series	Character	Actress	Result	Ref.
2017	BoJack Horseman	Sarah Lynn	Kristen Schaal	Nominated	
2017	F Is for Family	Ginny, Jimmy Fitzsimmons, Lex, Ben, Cutie Pie	Mo Collins	Nominated	
2019	F Is for Family	Rosie	Kevin Michael Richardson	Nominated	
2020	Big Mouth	Connie the Hormone Monstress	Maya Rudolph	Won	

Both Meryl Streep and David Attenborough have won Outstanding Narrator, the former for Five Came Back in 2017 and the latter for Our Planet in 2019.

Outstanding Narrator
Year	Series	Narrator	Episode	Result	Ref.
2017	Five Came Back	Meryl Streep	"The Price of Victory"	Won	
2019	Our Planet	David Attenborough	"One Planet"	Won	

== Individual Achievement in Animation ==
In 2019, Carmen Sandiego and Love, Death & Robots won the Outstanding Individual Achievement in Animation, with the latter winning four times for three different episodes.

Outstanding Individual Achievement in Animation
Year	Series	Recipient	Episode	Result	Ref.
2019	Carmen Sandiego	Elaine Lee (background painter)	"The Chasing Paper Caper"	Won	
2019	Love, Death & Robots	Alberto Mielgo (production designer)	"The Witness"	Won	
2019	Love, Death & Robots	David Pate (character animator)	"The Witness"	Won	
2019	Love, Death & Robots	Jun-ho Kim (background designer)	"Good Hunting"	Won	
2019	Love, Death & Robots	Owen Sullivan (storyboard artist)	"Sucker of Souls"	Won	

== Casting ==
In 2013, Laray Mayfield and Julie Schubert, from House of Cards, won for the first season of the series. The series was also nominated for seasons two, three, and four. In 2015 and 2016, Orange Is the New Black was nominated. Tara Feldstein Bennett, Carmen Cuba and Chase Paris, from Stranger Things, won the award in 2017. The Crown was nominated for its first three seasons, winning in 2018. In 2019 and 2020, Ozark was nominated for its second and third seasons.

Outstanding Casting for a Drama Series
Year	Program	Recipient(s)	Result	Ref.
2013	House of Cards	Laray Mayfield and Julie Schubert	Won	
2014	House of Cards	Laray Mayfield and Julie Schubert	Nominated	
2015	House of Cards	Laray Mayfield and Julie Schubert	Nominated	
2015	Orange Is the New Black	Jennifer Euston	Nominated	
2016	Orange Is the New Black	Jennifer Euston	Nominated	
2016	House of Cards	Laray Mayfield and Julie Schubert	Nominated	
2017	The Crown	Nina Gold and Robert Sterne	Nominated	
2017	Stranger Things	Tara Feldstein Bennett, Carmen Cuba, and Chase Paris	Won	
2018	Stranger Things	Tara Feldstein Bennett, Carmen Cuba, and Chase Paris	Nominated	
2018	The Crown	Nina Gold and Robert Sterne	Won	
2019	Ozark	Alexa L. Fogel, Tara Feldstein Bennett and Chase Paris	Nominated	
2020	Ozark	Alexa L. Fogel, Tara Feldstein Bennett and Chase Paris	Nominated	
2020	The Crown	Nina Gold and Robert Sterne	Nominated	

In 2014, Jennifer Euston won for the first season of Orange Is the New Black. A year later, the series was moved to the drama categories. Unbreakable Kimmy Schmidt was nominated two times for the award, in 2015 and 2016, while GLOW and Russian Doll were each nominated for their debut seasons; Dead to Me and Master of None were each nominated for their sophomore seasons.

Outstanding Casting for a Comedy Series
Year	Program	Recipient(s)	Result	Ref.
2014	Orange Is the New Black	Jennifer Euston	Won	
2015	Unbreakable Kimmy Schmidt	Jennifer Euston and Meredith Tucker	Nominated	
2016	Unbreakable Kimmy Schmidt	Cindy Tolan	Nominated	
2017	Master of None	Cody Beke and Teresa Razzauti	Nominated	
2018	GLOW	Jennifer Euston and Elizabeth Barnes	Nominated	
2019	Russian Doll	Christine Kromer	Nominated	
2020	Dead to Me	Sharon Bialy, Russell Scott and Sherry Thomas	Nominated	

The limited series When They See Us won in 2019, while Godless was nominated in 2018.

Outstanding Casting for a Limited Series, Movie, or Special
Year	Program	Recipient(s)	Result	Ref.
2018	Godless	Ellen Lewis, Rene Haynes and Jo Edna Boldin	Nominated	
2019	When They See Us	Aisha Coley, Billy Hopkins and Ashley Ingram	Won	
2020	Unbelievable	Laura Rosenthal, Jodi Angstreich, Kate Caldwell and Melissa Kostenbauder	Nominated	
2020	Unorthodox	Esther Kling, Vicki Thomson, Maria Rölcke and Cornelia Mareth	Nominated	

Queer Eye has won two out of three nominations, winning consecutively in 2018 and 2019.

Outstanding Casting for a Reality Program
Year	Program	Recipient(s)	Result	Ref.
2018	Queer Eye	Ally Capriotti Grant, Beyhan Oguz, Gretchen Palek and Danielle Gervais	Won	
2019	Queer Eye	Gretchen Palek, Danielle Gervais, Quinn Fegan, Ally Capriotti Grant and Pamela Vallarelli	Won	
2020	Queer Eye	Danielle Gervais, Beyhan Oguz, Pamela Vallarelli, Ally Capriotti Grant and Hana Sakata	Nominated	
2020	Love Is Blind	Donna Driscoll, Kelly Zack Castillo and Megan Feldman	Nominated	

== Cinematography ==
The Ranch won the award for seasons one, three and four, and nominated for season two. Donald A. Morgan is the cinematographer nominated for each season.

Outstanding Cinematography for a Multi-Camera Series
Year	Program	Episode	Recipient(s)	Result	Ref.
2017	The Ranch	"Easy Come, Easy Go"	Donald A. Morgan	Won	
2018	The Ranch	"Do What You Gotta Do"	Donald A. Morgan	Nominated	
2019	The Ranch	"Reckless"	Donald A. Morgan	Won	
2020	The Ranch	"It Ain't My Fault"	Donald A. Morgan	Won	
2020	Family Reunion	"Remember Black Elvis?"	John Simmons	Nominated	

In 2018, The End of the F***ing World and GLOW were nominated; the former received a second nomination in 2020. Russian Doll's Chris Teague won for his work on the episode "Ariadne" in 2019.

Outstanding Cinematography for a Single-Camera Series (Half-Hour)
Year	Program	Episode	Recipient(s)	Result	Ref.
2018	The End of the F***ing World	"Episode 3"	Justin Brown	Nominated	
2018	GLOW	"Pilot"	Christian Sprenger	Nominated	
2019	Russian Doll	"Ariadne"	Chris Teague	Won	
2020	The End of the F***ing World	"Episode 2"	Benedict Spence	Nominated	

House of Cards won for Outstanding Cinematography for a Single-Camera Series (One Hour) in 2013. The series was also nominated for seasons two, three, and four. In 2017, The Crown, Sense8 and Stranger Things were each nominated for the award. In 2018, Adriano Goldman, from The Crown, won for his work on the episode "Beryl"; Goldman was also nominated in 2017 and 2020. Meanwhile, Ben Kutchins was nominated twice for Ozark in 2018 and 2020.

Outstanding Cinematography for a Single-Camera Series (One Hour)
Year	Program	Episode	Recipient(s)	Result	Ref.
2013	House of Cards	"Chapter 1"	Eigil Bryld	Won	
2014	House of Cards	"Chapter 18"	Igor Martinovic	Nominated	
2015	House of Cards	"Chapter 29"	Martin Ahlgren	Nominated	
2016	House of Cards	"Chapter 45"	David M. Dunlap	Nominated	
2017	The Crown	"Smoke and Mirrors"	Adriano Goldman	Nominated	
2017	Sense8	"Obligate Mutualisms"	John Toll	Nominated	
2017	Stranger Things	"Chapter Eight: The Upside Down"	Tim Ives	Nominated	
2018	Stranger Things	"Chapter One: MADMAX"	Tim Ives	Nominated	
2018	The Crown	"Beryl"	Adriano Goldman	Won	
2018	Ozark	"The Toll"	Ben Kutchins	Nominated	
2020	Ozark	"Civil Union"	Ben Kutchins	Nominated	
2020	Ozark	"Boss Fight"	Armando Salas	Nominated	
2020	Mindhunter	"Episode 6"	Erik Messerschmidt	Nominated	
2020	The Crown	"Aberfan"	Adriano Goldman	Nominated	

Black Mirror was nominated for the episodes "Nosedive" and "USS Callister". Godless scored a nomination in the category for "An Incident at Creede". In 2019, When They See Us was nominated for the episode "Part 1" by cinematographer Bradford Young.

Outstanding Cinematography for a Limited Series or Movie
Year	Program	Episode	Recipient(s)	Result	Ref.
2017	Black Mirror	"Nosedive"	Seamus McGarvey	Nominated	
2018	Black Mirror	"USS Callister"	Stephan Pehrsson	Nominated	
2018	Godless	"An Incident at Creede"	Steven Meizler	Nominated	
2019	When They See Us	"Part 1"	Bradford Young	Nominated	

For his work in Queer Eye, Garrett Rose has been nominated three times, in 2018, 2019 and 2020.

Outstanding Cinematography for a Reality Program
Year	Program	Episode	Recipient(s)	Result	Ref.
2018	Queer Eye	"To Gay or Not Too Gay"	Garrett Rose	Nominated	
2019	Queer Eye	"God Bless Gay"	Garrett Rose	Nominated	
2020	Queer Eye	"We're in Japan!: Japanese Holiday"	Garrett Rose	Nominated	

In 2015, Franklin Down won for his work in Virunga. The series Chef's Table has received two consecutive nominations in 2017 and 2018 while Our Planet was nominated for three different episodes in 2019.

Outstanding Cinematography for a Nonfiction Program
Year	Program	Episode	Recipient(s)	Result	Ref.
2014	The Square		Jehane Noujaim, Muhammad Hamdy, Ahmed Hassan and Cressida Trew	Nominated	
2015	Virunga		Franklin Dow	Won	
2016	What Happened, Miss Simone?		Igor Martinovic and Rachel Morrison	Nominated	
2017	13th		Hans Charles and Kira Kelly	Nominated	
2017	Chef's Table	"Virgilio Martinez"	Will Basanta	Nominated	
2018	Chef's Table	"Corrado Assenza"	Adam Bricker	Nominated	
2019	Our Planet	"Coastal Seas"	Doug Anderson and Gavin Thurston	Nominated	
2019	Our Planet	"Jungles"	Alastair MacEwen and Matt Aeberhard	Nominated	
2019	Our Planet	"One Planet"	Jamie McPherson and Roger Horrocks	Nominated	
2020	American Factory		Erick Stoll and Aubrey Keith	Nominated	
2020	Becoming		Nadia Hallgren	Nominated	

== Costumes ==
The comedy series Grace and Frankie has received five consecutive nominations (2016-2020). In 2019, Jennifer Rogien, Charlotte Svenson, Melissa Stanton won for their work in the episode "Superiority Complex" from Russian Doll.

Outstanding Contemporary Costumes
Year	Program	Episode	Nominees	Result	Ref.
2016	Grace and Frankie	"The Party"	Allyson Fanger, Lori DeLapp	Nominated	
2017	Grace and Frankie	"The Art Show"	Allyson Fanger, Heather Pain, Lori DeLapp	Nominated	
2017	House of Cards	"Chapter 61"	Johanna Argan, Kemal Harris, Jessica Wenger, Steffany Bernstein-Pratt	Nominated	
2018	Grace and Frankie	"The Expiration Date"	Allyson B. Fanger, Heather Pain, Lori DeLapp	Nominated	
2019	Grace and Frankie	"The Wedding"	Allyson B. Fanger, Kristine Haag, Lori DeLapp	Nominated	
2019	Russian Doll	"Superiority Complex"	Jennifer Rogien, Charlotte Svenson, Melissa Stanton	Won	
2020	Grace and Frankie	"The Tank"	Allyson B. Fanger, Kristine Haag, Lori DeLapp	Nominated	
2020	The Politician	"Pilot"	Jennifer Rogien, Charlotte Svenson, Melissa Stanton	Nominated	
2020	Unorthodox	"Part 2"	Justine Seymour, Simone Kreska, Barbara Schramm	Nominated	

The A Series of Unfortunate Events has been nominated twice, in 2018 and 2019.

Outstanding Fantasy/Sci-Fi Costumes
Year	Program	Episode	Nominees	Result	Ref.
2018	A Series of Unfortunate Events	"The Vile Village, Part 1"	Cynthia Summers, Phoebe Parsons, Kelsey Chobotar	Nominated	
2019	A Series of Unfortunate Events	"Penultimate Peril, Part 2"	Cynthia Summers, Kelsey Chobotar, Phoebe Parsons, Lorelei Burk, Courtney McKenzie	Nominated	

The period drama The Crown has won thrice, in 2017, 2018 and 2020.

Outstanding Period Costumes
Year	Program	Episode	Nominees	Result	Ref.
2017	The Crown	"Wolfert on Splash"	Michele Clapton, Alex Fordham, Emma O'Loughlin, Kate O'Farrell	Won	
2018	The Crown	"Dear Mrs. Kennedy"	Jane Petrie, Emily Newby, Basia Kuznar, Gaby Spanswick	Won	
2019	GLOW	"Every Potato Has a Receipt"	Beth Morgan, Alexandra Casey, Sharon Taylor Sampson	Nominated	
2020	The Crown	"Cri de Coeur"	Amy Roberts, Sidonie Roberts, Sarah Moore	Won	
2020	Hollywood	"A Hollywood Ending"	Lou Eyrich, Sarah Evelyn, Tiger Curran, Suzy Freeman	Nominated	

In 2019, the concert film Homecoming: A Film by Beyoncé received a nomination.

Outstanding Costumes for a Variety, Nonfiction, or Reality Programming
Year	Program	Episode	Nominees	Result	Ref.
2019	Homecoming: A Film by Beyoncé		Marni Senofonte, Olivier Rousteing, Timothy White	Nominated	

== Directing ==
Out of the several programs nominated, three have won for Outstanding Directing for a Documentary/Nonfiction Program, Jehane Noujaim for The Square in 2014, Moira Demos and Laura Ricciardi for Making a Murderer in 2016 and Steven Bognar and Julia Reichert for American Factory in 2020.

Outstanding Directing for a Documentary/Nonfiction Program
Year	Program	Episode	Nominees	Result	Ref.
2014	The Square		Jehane Noujaim	Won	
2016	Making a Murderer	"Fighting for Their Lives"	Moira Demos and Laura Ricciardi	Won	
2016	Chef's Table	"Gaggan Anand"	David Gelb	Nominated	
2016	What Happened, Miss Simone?		Liz Garbus	Nominated	
2017	13th		Ava DuVernay	Nominated	
2018	Icarus		Bryan Fogel	Nominated	
2018	Wild Wild Country	"Part 3"	Chapman Way and Maclain Way	Nominated	
2019	Fyre: The Greatest Party That Never Happened		Chris Smith	Nominated	
2020	American Factory		Steven Bognar and Julia Reichert	Won	
2020	Becoming		Nadia Hallgren	Nominated	
2020	Tiger King: Murder, Mayhem and Madness	"Cult of Personality"	Eric Goode and Rebecca Chaiklin	Nominated	

In 2020, Linda Mendoza received a nomination for directing the episode "Flame Monroe" from Tiffany Haddish Presents: They Ready.

Outstanding Directing for a Variety Series
Year	Program	Episode	Nominees	Result	Ref.
2020	Tiffany Haddish Presents: They Ready	"Flame Monroe"	Linda Mendoza	Nominated	

Two Netflix specials have won in this category, Thom Zimny for Springsteen on Broadway in 2019 and Stan Lathan for Dave Chappelle: Sticks & Stones in 2020.

Outstanding Directing for a Variety Special
Year	Program	Nominees	Result	Ref.
2018	Dave Chappelle: Equanimity	Stan Lathan	Nominated	
2018	Jerry Seinfeld: Jerry Before Seinfeld	Michael Bonfiglio	Nominated	
2018	Steve Martin & Martin Short: An Evening You Will Forget for the Rest of Your Life	Marcus Raboy	Nominated	
2019	Springsteen on Broadway	Thom Zimny	Won	
2019	Homecoming: A Film by Beyoncé	Beyoncé Knowles Carter and Ed Burke	Nominated	
2020	Dave Chappelle: Sticks & Stones	Stan Lathan	Won	

For his directing in Queer Eye, Hisham Abed was nominated in 2019 and 2020, winning the former, while in 2020, Greg Whiteley won for directing the episode "Daytona" from Cheer.

Outstanding Directing for a Reality Program
Year	Program	Episode	Nominees	Result	Ref.
2019	Queer Eye	"Black Girl Magic"	Hisham Abed	Won	
2020	Queer Eye	"Disabled But Not Really"	Hisham Abed	Nominated	
2020	Cheer	"Daytona"	Greg Whiteley	Won	

== Hairstyling ==
Until 2019, hairstyling categories for series were split in Outstanding Hairstyling for a Single-Camera Series and Outstanding Hairstyling for a Limited Series or Series, series like The Crown and GLOW received two nomination for the single-camera category while the miniseries Godless was nominated for the limited series/movie one.

Outstanding Hairstyling for a Single-Camera Series
Year	Program	Episode	Nominees	Result	Ref.
2017	Stranger Things	"Chapter Two: The Weirdo on Maple Street"	Sarah Hindsgaul and Evelyn Roach	Nominated	
2017	The Crown	"Hyde Park Corner"	Ivana Primorac and Amy Riley	Nominated	
2018	The Crown	"Dear Mrs. Kennedy"	Ivana Primorac	Nominated	
2018	GLOW	"Pilot"	Theraesa Rivers, Valerie Jackson, Leslie Bennett and Jules Holdren	Nominated	
2019	GLOW	"The Good Twin"	Theraesa Rivers, Valerie Jackson, Mishell Chandler, Deborah Pierce, Loretta Nero, Jason Green	Nominated	

Outstanding Hairstyling for a Limited Series or Movie
Year	Program	Episode	Nominees	Result	Ref.
2018	Godless		Geordie Sheffer, Megan Daum and Carmen Jones	Nominated	

In 2020, the previous categories for hairstyling for series were divided in Outstanding Contemporary Hairstyling and Outstanding Period and/or Character Hairstyling.

Outstanding Contemporary Hairstyling
Year	Program	Episode	Nominees	Result	Ref.
2020	Grace and Frankie	"The Laughing Stock"	Kelly Kline, Jonathan Hanousek, Marlene Williams	Nominated	
2020	The Politician	"Pilot"	Chris Clark, Natalie Driscoll, Havana Prats	Nominated	

Outstanding Period and/or Character Hairstyling
Year	Program	Episode	Nominees	Result	Ref.
2020	Hollywood	"A Hollywood Ending"	Michelle Ceglia, Barry Lee Moe, George Guzman, Michele Arvizo, Maria Elena Pantoja	Won	
2020	The Crown	"Cri de Coeur"	Cate Hall, Louise Coles, Sarah Nuth, Suzanne David, Emilie Yong, Catriona Johnstone	Nominated	

== Hosting ==
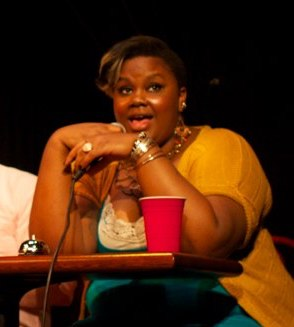
Nicole Byer became the first black woman to be nominated for this category.

In 2019, Marie Kondo was nominated for hosting Tidying Up with Marie Kondo while in 2020, Nicole Byer and the Fav Five (Bobby Berk, Karamo Brown, Tan France, Antoni Porowski and Jonathan Van Ness) were nominated for Nailed It! and Queer Eye respectively.

Outstanding Host for a Reality or Competition Program
Year	Nominees	Program	Result	Ref.
2019	Marie Kondo	Tidying Up with Marie Kondo	Nominated	
2020	Bobby Berk, Karamo Brown, Tan France, Antoni Porowski and Jonathan Van Ness	Queer Eye	Nominated	
2020	Nicole Byer	Nailed It!	Nominated	

== Interactive Media ==
Several series have received nominations for their interactive media, Stranger Things was nominated twice, for Stranger Things VR Experience in 2017 and for Stranger Things: Scoops Ahoy: Operation Scoop Snoop in 2020. In 2019, Black Mirror won for their interactive episode Bandersnatch and in 2020, Big Mouth won for Big Mouth Guide to Life.

Outstanding Original Creative Achievement in Interactive Media within a Scripted Program
Year	Program	Media	Nominees	Result	Ref.
2017	Stranger Things	Stranger Things VR Experience	Netflix, CBS Digital	Nominated	
2018	13 Reasons Why	13 Reasons Why: Talk to the Reasons	Ali Feinstein, Javier Ricaud, MK Malone, Kevin Cornish and Moth + Flame	Nominated	
2019	Black Mirror	Bandersnatch	Netflix, House of Tomorrow	Won	
Outstanding Original Interactive Program
Year	Program	Media	Nominees	Result	Ref.
2019	You vs. Wild		Rob Buchta, Bear Grylls, Chris Grant, Delbert Shoopman and Ben Simms	Nominated	
Outstanding Derivative Interactive Program
Year	Program	Media	Nominees	Result	Ref.
2020	Big Mouth	Big Mouth Guide to Life	Social Life, Netflix	Won	
Outstanding Interactive Extension of a Linear Program
Year	Program	Media	Nominees	Result	Ref.
2020	Stranger Things	Stranger Things: Scoops Ahoy: Operation Scoop Snoop	m ss ng p eces	Nominated	

== Main Title Design ==
Since 2015, every year at least one series receives a nomination for their opening title cards, in total, 10 series have been nominated with Stranger Things winning in 2017.

Outstanding Main Title Design
Year	Program	Nominees	Result	Ref.
2015	Marvel's Daredevil	Patrick Clair, Andrew Romatz, Miguel Salek, Shahana Kahn	Nominated	
2016	Marvel's Jessica Jones	Michelle Dougherty, Arisu Kashiwagi, Rod Basham, David Mack, Eric Demeusy, Thomas McMahan	Nominated	
2016	Narcos	Tom O'Neill, Nik Kleverov, David Badounts, Josh Smith	Nominated	
2017	The Crown	Patrick Clair, Raoul Marks, Javier Leon Carrillo, Jeff Han	Nominated	
2017	Stranger Things	Michelle Dougherty, Peter Frankfurt, Arisu Kashiwagi, Eric Demeusy	Won	
2018	Altered Carbon	Lisa Bolan, Thomas McMahan, Yongsub Song, Byron Slaybaugh, Carlo Sa and Mert Kizilay	Nominated	
2018	GLOW	Jason Groves, Christopher Harding and Richard Kenworthy	Nominated	
2019	Conversations with a Killer: The Ted Bundy Tapes	Lisa Bolan, Peter Murphy, Alyssa Oh and June Cho	Nominated	
2020	Abstract: The Art of Design	Allie Fisher, Anthony Zazzi and Brian Oakes	Nominated	
2020	The Politician	Heidi Berg, Felix Soletic, Carlo Sa, Yongsub Song, Joe Paniagua and Rachel Fowler	Nominated	

== Make-Up ==
Until 2019, non-prosthetic makeup categories were divided in Outstanding Makeup for a Single-Camera Series (Non-Prosthetic) and Outstanding Makeup for a Limited Series or Movie (Non-Prosthetic). Comedy series GLOW received two nominations in the single-camera category, in 2018 and 2019.

Outstanding Makeup for a Single-Camera Series (Non-Prosthetic)
Year	Program	Episode	Nominees	Result	Ref.
2017	Stranger Things	"Chapter Six: The Monster"	Myke Michaels, Teresa Vest	Nominated	
2018	GLOW	"Money's in the Chase"	Lana Horochowski, Maurine Burke, Lesa Nielson Duff, Melissa Buell, Kristina Frisch	Nominated	
2019	GLOW	"The Good Twin"	Lana Horochowski, Maurine Burke, Lesa Nielson Duff, Melissa Buell, Kristina Frisch	Nominated	

In 2020, the previous categories for non-prosthetic makeup were divided in Outstanding Contemporary Makeup (Non-Prosthetic) and Outstanding Period and/or Character Makeup (Non-Prosthetic).

Outstanding Contemporary Makeup (Non-Prosthetic)
Year	Program	Episode	Nominees	Result	Ref.
2020	Ozark	"In Case of Emergency"	Tracy Ewell, Jillian Erickson, Jack Lazzaro, Susan Reilly Lehane	Nominated	
2020	The Politician	"The Assassination of Payton Hobart"	Autumn Butler, Caitlin Martini Emery, Debra Schrey, Emma Burton	Nominated	

Outstanding Period and/or Character Makeup (Non-Prosthetic)
Year	Program	Episode	Nominees	Result	Ref.
2020	Hollywood	"Outlaws"	Eryn Krueger Mekash, Kim Ayers, Kerrin Jackson, Ana Gabriela Quiñonez	Nominated	

Outstanding Prosthetic Makeup for a Series, Limited Series, Movie or Special
Year	Program	Episode	Nominees	Result	Ref.
2020	Hollywood	"Jump"	Vincent Van Dyke, Cary Ayers, Bruce Spaulding Fuller	Nominated	

== Motion design ==
Outstanding Motion Design
Year	Program	Nominees	Result	Ref.
2017	13th	Angus Wall, Leanne Dare, Lynn Cho, Dan Meehan, Ekin Akalin	Won	
2019	Patriot Act with Hasan Minhaj	Michelle Higa Fox, Jorge L. Peschiera, Yussef Cole, Brandon Sugiyama, Paris London Glickman	Won	
2020	Inside Bill's Brain: Decoding Bill Gates	Leanne Dare, Eben McCue, Sebastian Hoppe-Fuentes, David Navas	Won	

== Music ==
Composer Jeff Beal received five nominations for House of Cards, winning twice, in 2015 and 2017.

Outstanding Music Composition for a Series
Year	Program	Episode	Nominees	Result	Ref.
2013	Arrested Development	"Flight of the Phoenix"	David Schwartz	Nominated	
2013	House of Cards	"Chapter 1"	Jeff Beal	Nominated	
2014	House of Cards	"Chapter 26"	Jeff Beal	Nominated	
2015	House of Cards	"Chapter 32"	Jeff Beal	Won	
2015	Chef's Table	"Francis Mallmann"	Duncan Thum	Nominated	
2016	Chef's Table	"Grant Achatz"	Duncan Thum	Nominated	
2017	The Crown	"Hyde Park Corner"	Rupert Gregson-Williams	Nominated	
2017	House of Cards	"Chapter 63"	Jeff Beal	Won	
2017	A Series of Unfortunate Events	"A Bad Beginning"	James Newton Howard	Nominated	
2018	Marvel's Jessica Jones	"AKA Playland"	Sean Callery	Nominated	
2019	House of Cards	"Chapter 73"	Jeff Beal	Nominated	
2020	The Crown	"Aberfan"	Martin Phipps	Nominated	
2020	Ozark	"All In"	Danny Bensi and Saunder Jurriaans	Nominated	

Limited series like Godless, When They See Us and Unorthodox have received nominations for their music.

Outstanding Music Composition for a Limited Series, Movie, or Special
Year	Program	Episode	Nominees	Result	Ref.
2017	Five Came Back	"The Price of Victory"	Jeremy Turner	Nominated	
2017	The White Helmets		Patrick Jonsson	Nominated	
2018	Alias Grace	"Part 1"	Mychael Danna and Jeff Danna	Nominated	
2018	Godless	"Homecoming"	Carlos Rafael Rivera	Nominated	
2018	Black Mirror	"USS Callister"	Daniel Pemberton	Nominated	
2019	When They See Us	"Part 2"	Kris Bowers	Nominated	
2020	Hollywood	"Hooray for Hollywood, Part 2"	Nathan Barr	Nominated	
2020	Unorthodox	"Part 1"	Antonio Gambale	Nominated	

For scoring the documentary Becoming, Kamasi Washington received nominations for Outstanding Music Composition for a Documentary Series or Special and for the Grammy Award for Best Score Soundtrack for Visual Media.

Outstanding Music Composition for a Documentary Series or Special
Year	Program	Episode	Nominees	Result	Ref.
2019	Our Planet	"One Planet"	Steven Price	Nominated	
2020	Becoming		Kamasi Washington	Nominated	
2020	Tiger King: Murder, Mayhem and Madness	"Not Your Average Joe"	John Enroth, Albert Fox and Mark Mothersbaugh	Nominated	

Four series have won Outstanding Original Main Title Theme Music, Marvel's Jessica Jones, Stranger Things, Godless and Hollywood.

Outstanding Original Main Title Theme Music
Year	Program	Nominees	Result	Ref.
2013	Hemlock Grove	Nathan Barr	Nominated	
2013	House of Cards	Jeff Beal	Nominated	
2015	Marco Polo	Daniele Luppi	Nominated	
2016	Marvel's Jessica Jones	Sean Callery	Won	
2016	Narcos	Rodrigo Amarante	Nominated	
2016	Sense8	Johnny Klimek and Tom Tykwer	Nominated	
2017	Stranger Things	Michael Stein and Kyle Dixon	Won	
2018	Godless	Carlos Rafael Rivera	Won	
2018	Marvel's The Defenders	John Paesano	Nominated	
2018	Somebody Feed Phil	Mike S. Olson, Bridget Ellen Kearney, Michael Calabrese and Rachael Price	Nominated	
2019	Our Planet	Steven Price	Nominated	
2020	Hollywood	Nathan Barr	Won	
2020	Unorthodox	Antonio Gambale	Nominated	

Paul Shaffer was nominated in 2016 for A Very Murray Christmas.

Outstanding Music Direction
Year	Program	Episode	Nominees	Result	Ref.
2016	A Very Murray Christmas		Paul Shaffer	Nominated	
2018	Homecoming: A Film by Beyoncé		Beyoncé Knowles-Carter and Derek Dixie	Nominated	

For her work in Stranger Things, Nora Felder was nominated three times, in 2017, 2018 and 2020.

Outstanding Music Supervision
Year	Program	Episode	Nominees	Result	Ref.
2017	Master of None	"Amarsi Un Po"	Zach Cowie, Kerri Drootin	Nominated	
2017	Stranger Things	"Chapter Two: The Weirdo on Maple Street"	Nora Felder	Nominated	
2018	Stranger Things	"Chapter Two: Trick or Treat, Freak"	Nora Felder	Nominated	
2019	Quincy		Jasper Leak	Nominated	
2019	Russian Doll	"Nothing in This World Is Easy"	Brienne Rose	Nominated	
2020	Stranger Things	"Chapter Three: The Case of the Missing Lifeguard"	Nora Felder	Nominated	

American rapper Common, Robert Glasper and Karriem Riggins won for their song "Letter to the Free" for the documentary 13th.

Outstanding Original Music and Lyrics
Year	Program	Song	Nominees	Result	Ref.
2017	13th	"Letter to the Free"	Common, Robert Glasper, Karriem Riggins	Won	
2017	Unbreakable Kimmy Schmidt	"Hell No"	Jeff Richmond, Tina Fey, Sam Means	Nominated	
2018	Big Mouth	"Totally Gay"	Mark Rivers	Nominated	
2018	Steve Martin & Martin Short: An Evening You Will Forget for the Rest of Your Life	"The Buddy Song"	Steve Martin	Nominated	
2020	The Black Godfather	"Letter to My Godfather"	Chad Hugo and Pharrell Williams	Nominated	

== Picture Editing ==
Pat Barnett received three nominations for One Day at a Time, winning in 2019.

Outstanding Multi-Camera Picture Editing for a Comedy Series
Year	Program	Episode	Nominees	Result	Ref.
2017	One Day at a Time	"A Snowman's Tale"	Pat Barnett	Nominated	
2018	One Day at a Time	"Not Yet"	Pat Barnett	Nominated	
2019	One Day at a Time	"The Funeral"	Pat Barnett	Won	

Stranger Things has received four nominations, winning in 2017 for the episode "Chapter One: The Vanishing of Will Byers".

Outstanding Single-Camera Picture Editing for a Drama Series
Year	Program	Episode	Nominees	Result	Ref.
2013	House of Cards	"Chapter 1"	Kirk Baxter	Nominated	
2014	House of Cards	"Chapter 14"	Byron Smith	Nominated	
2016	Narcos	"Descenso"	Leo Trombetta	Nominated	
2017	Stranger Things	"Chapter One: The Vanishing of Will Byers"	Dean Zimmerman	Won	
2017	Stranger Things	"Chapter Seven: The Bathtub"	Kevin D. Ross	Nominated	
2018	Stranger Things	"Chapter Nine: The Gate"	Kevin D. Ross	Nominated	
2019	Ozark	"One Way Out"	Cindy Mollo and Heather Goodwin Floyd	Nominated	
2020	Ozark	"Fire Pink"	Vikash Patel	Nominated	
2020	Ozark	"Wartime"	Cindy Mollo	Nominated	
2020	Stranger Things	"Chapter Eight: The Battle of Starcourt"	Dean Zimmerman and Katheryn Naranjo	Nominated	

Orange Is the New Black received three nominations in 2014 winning once.

Outstanding Single-Camera Picture Editing for a Comedy Series
Year	Program	Episode	Nominees	Result	Ref.
2013	Arrested Development	"Flight of the Phoenix"	Kabir Akhtar, A.J. Dickerson	Nominated	
2014	Orange Is the New Black	"Tall Men With Feelings"	Shannon Mitchell	Nominated	
2014	Orange Is the New Black	"Can't Fix Crazy"	Michael S. Stern	Nominated	
2014	Orange Is the New Black	"Tit Punch"	William Turro	Won	
2017	Master of None	"The Thief"	Jennifer Lilly	Won	
2019	Russian Doll	"Ariadne"	Laura Weinberg	Nominated	

Selina MacArthur won in 2018 for the episode "USS Callister" from Black Mirror.

Outstanding Single-Camera Picture Editing for a Limited Series or Movie
Year	Program	Episode	Nominees	Result	Ref.
2018	Black Mirror	"USS Callister"	Selina MacArthur	Won	
2020	El Camino: A Breaking Bad Movie		Skip Macdonald	Nominated	

For his work in two Dave Chappelle variety specials, Jeff U'ren has been nominated twice, in 2018 and 2020.

Outstanding Picture Editing for Variety Programming
Year	Program	Episode	Nominees	Result	Ref.
2018	Dave Chappelle: Equanimity		Jeff U'ren	Nominated	
2020	Dave Chappelle: Sticks & Stones		Jeff U'ren	Nominated	

Moira Demos won in 2016 for the episode "Indefensible" from Making a Murderer.

Outstanding Picture Editing for a Nonfiction Program
Year	Program	Episode	Nominees	Result	Ref.
2014	The Square		Pedro Kos, Christopher de la Torre, Mohamed El Manasterly	Nominated	
2016	Making a Murderer	"Indefensible"	Moira Demos	Won	
2016	What Happened, Miss Simone?		Joshua L. Pearson	Nominated	
2017	13th		Spencer Averick	Nominated	
2018	Wild Wild Country	"Part 3"	Neil Meiklejohn	Nominated	
2020	American Factory		Lindsay Utz	Nominated	
2020	Tiger King: Murder, Mayhem and Madness	"Cult of Personality"	Doug Abel, Nicholas Biagetti, Dylan Hansen-Fliedner, Geoffrey Richman and Daniel Koehler	Nominated	

Queer Eye has won two out of three nominations.

Outstanding Picture Editing for a Structured Reality or Competition Program
Year	Program	Episode	Nominees	Result	Ref.
2018	Queer Eye	-	Thomas Scott Reuther, Joe DeShano, A.M. Peters, Ryan Taylor, Matthew D. Miller, Brian Ray	Won	
2019	Queer Eye	-	Joseph Deshano, Matthew Miller, Ryan Taylor, Carlos Gamarra, Iain Tibbles and Tony Zajkowski	Won	
2020	Queer Eye	"Disabled but Not Really"	Ryan Taylor and Tony Zajkowski	Nominated	

The editing team from Cheer won in 2020 for the episode "God Blessed Texas".

Outstanding Picture Editing for an Unstructured Reality Program
Year	Program	Episode	Nominees	Result	Ref.
2020	Cheer	"God Blessed Texas"	Arielle Kilker, David Nordstrom, Kate Hackett, Daniel McDonald, Mark Morgan, Sharon Weaver and Ted Woerner	Won	

== Production Design ==
House of Cards received three consecutive nominations from 2014 to 2016 when contemporary and fantasy series where awarded within the same category. In 2018, fantasy series were paired with the period ones to be rewarded in a category separated from contemporary programs. Ozark has been nominated three years in a row, from 2018 to 2020.

Outstanding Production Design for a Narrative Contemporary Program (One Hour or More)
Year	Program	Episode(s)	Nominees	Result	Ref.
2014	House of Cards	"Chapter 18", "Chapter 24"	Steve Arnold, Halina Gebarowicz, Tiffany Zappulla	Nominated	
2015	House of Cards	"Chapter 29", "Chapter 36"	Steve Arnold, Halina Gebarowicz, Tiffany Zappulla	Nominated	
2016	House of Cards	"Chapter 41", "Chapter 47", "Chapter 48"	Steve Arnold, Halina Gebarowicz, Tiffany Zappulla	Nominated	
2018	Ozark	"My Dripping Sleep"	Derek R. Hill, John Richardson, Chuck Potter	Nominated	
2019	Ozark	"Outer Darkness," "The Gold Coast"	Derek R. Hill, John Richardson, Kim Leoleis	Nominated	
2019	The Umbrella Academy	"We Only See Each Other at Weddings and Funerals"	Mark Worthington, Mark Steele, Jim Lambie	Nominated	
2020	Ozark	"Wartime"	David Bomba, Sean Ryan Jennings, Kim Leoleis	Nominated	

Outstanding Production Design for a Narrative Period or Fantasy Program (One Hour or More)
Year	Program	Episode(s)	Nominees	Result	Ref.
2017	Stranger Things	"Chapter One: The Vanishing of Will Byers"	Chris Trujillo, William Davis, Jess Royal	Nominated	
2017	The Crown	"Smoke and Mirrors"	Martin Childs, Mark Raggett, Celia Bobak	Won	
2018	The Crown	"Beryl"	Martin Childs, Mark Raggett, Alison Harvey	Nominated	
2019	A Series of Unfortunate Events	"Penultimate Peril, Part 1"	Bo Welch, Don MacAulay, Kate Marshall	Nominated	
2020	Hollywood		Matthew Flood Ferguson, Mark Robert Taylor, Melissa Licht	Nominated	
2020	The Crown	"Aberfan"	Martin Childs, Mark Raggett, Alison Harvey	Won	

Outstanding Production Design for a Narrative Program (Half-Hour or Less)
Year	Program	Episode	Nominees	Result	Ref.
2017	Grace and Frankie	"The Burglary," "The Gun"	Devorah Herbert, Ben Edelberg, Christopher Carlson	Nominated	
2018	Grace and Frankie	"The Tappys," "The Landline," "The Home"	Devorah Herbert, Amy Wheeler, Andrea Fenton	Nominated	
2018	GLOW	"The Dusty Spur"	Todd Fjelsted, Harry Otto, Ryan Watson	Won	
2019	Russian Doll	"Nothing in This World Is Easy"	Michael Bricker, John Cox, Jessica Petruccelli	Won	
2020	GLOW	"Up, Up, Up"	Todd Fjelsted, Valerie Green, Cynthia Slagter	Nominated	
2020	Space Force	"The Launch"	Susie Mancini, Gary Warshaw, Rachael Ferrara	Nominated	

Outstanding Production Design for a Variety, Nonfiction, Reality or Reality-Competition Series
Year	Program	Episode	Nominees	Result	Ref.
2017	Bill Nye Saves the World	"Earth Is a Hot Mess"	James Pearse Connelly, Lydia Smyth, Stephanie Hines Trigg	Nominated	
2018	Bill Nye Saves the World	"Extinction: Why All Our Friends Are Dying"	James Pearse Connelly, James Nelson, John Calderon, Heather Cantrell	Nominated	
2019	Queer Eye	"Jones Bar-B-Q"	Thomas Rouse	Nominated	
2020	Queer Eye	"We're in Japan!: The Ideal Woman"	Thomas Rouse	Nominated	

Outstanding Production Design for a Variety Special
Year	Program	Episode	Nominees	Result	Ref.
2019	Homecoming: A Film by Beyoncé		Ric Lipson, Rachel Duncan, Andrew Makadsi	Nominated	

== Sound ==
=== Editing ===
Outstanding Sound Editing for a Comedy or Drama Series (One-Hour)
Year	Program	Episode	Nominees	Result	Ref.
2015	Marvel's Daredevil	"Speak of the Devil"	Lauren Stephens, Jordan Wilby, Joshua Chase, Christian Buenaventura, Greg Vines, Alicia Stevenson, Dawn Lunsford	Nominated	
2016	Marvel's Daredevil	"New York's Finest"	Lauren Stephens, Jordan Wilby, Jonathan Golodner, Christian Buenaventura, Greg Vines, Zane Bruce, Lindsay Pepper	Nominated	
2017	Stranger Things	"Chapter Eight: The Upside Down"	Bradley North, Craig Henighan, Jordan Wilby, Jonathan Golodner, Tiffany S. Griffth, Sam Munoz, David Klotz, Noel Vought, Ginger Geary	Won	
2018	Stranger Things	"Chapter Eight: The Mind Flayer"	Bradley North, Craig Henighan, Tiffany S. Griffth, Jordan Wilby, David Werntz, Antony Zeller, David Klotz, Zane Bruce, Lindsay Pepper	Won	
2020	Stranger Things	"Chapter Eight: The Battle of Starcourt"	Craig Henighan, William Files, Ryan Cole, Kerry Dean Williams, Angelo Palazzo, Katie Halliday, David Klotz, Steve Baine	Won	
2020	The Crown	"Aberfan"	Lee Walpole, Andy Kennedy, Saoirse Christopherson, Juraj Mravec, Tom Williams, Steve Little, Tom Stewart, Anna Wright, Catherine Thomas	Nominated	

Outstanding Sound Editing for a Comedy or Drama Series (Half-Hour) and Animation
Year	Program	Episode	Nominees	Result	Ref.
2019	Love, Death & Robots	"The Secret War"	Brad North, Craig Henighan, Jordan Wilby, Troy Prehmus, Jeff Charbonneau, Alicia Stevenson, Dawn Lunsford	Nominated	
2019	Russian Doll	"The Way Out"	Alex Soto, Thomas Ryan, Wen-Hsuan Tseng	Nominated	
2020	GLOW	"The Libertines"	Robb Navrides, Colette Dahanne, Jason Lezama, David Beadle, Jason Krane, Larry Hopkins	Nominated	
2020	Space Force	"The Launch"	Bobby Mackston, Paul Hammond, Sean Garnhart, Vincent Guisetti	Nominated	

Outstanding Sound Editing for a Limited Series, Movie, or Special
Year	Program	Episode	Nominees	Result	Ref.
2018	Black Mirror	"USS Callister"	Kenny Clark, Michael Maroussas, Dario Swade, Ricky Butt, Oliver Ferris	Won	
2018	Godless	"Homecoming"	Wylie Stateman, Eric Hoehn, Harry Cohen, Gregg Swiatlowski, Hector C. Gika, Leo Marcil, Sylvain Lasseur, Jackie Zhou, Tom Kramer	Nominated	
2019	When They See Us	"Part 4"	John Benson, Susan Dudeck, Bruce Tanis, Chase Keene, Jesse Pomeroy, Naaman Haynes, Bobbi Banks, Elliott Koretz, Matt Wilson, Suat Ayas, Jen Monnar, Dawn Lunsford, Alicia Stevenson	Nominated	
2020	El Camino: A Breaking Bad Movie		Nick Forshager, Todd Toon, Kathryn Madsen, Jane Boegel, Luke Gibleon, Jason Tregoe Newman, Bryant J. Fuhrmann, Jeff Cranford, Gregg Barbanell, Alex Ullrich	Nominated	

Outstanding Sound Editing for a Nonfiction or Reality Program (Single or Multi-Camera)
Year	Program	Episode	Nominees	Result	Ref.
2016	Making a Murderer	"Lack of Humanity"	Daniel Ward, Leslie Bloome	Nominated	
2016	What Happened, Miss Simone?		Joshua L. Pearson, Dan Timmons	Nominated	
2017	13th		Tim Boggs, Alex Lee, Julie Pierce, Lise Richardson	Nominated	
2018	Wild Wild Country	"Part 1"	Brent Kiser, Jacob Flack, Elliot Thompson, Danielle Price, Timothy Preston	Nominated	
2019	Fyre: The Greatest Party That Never Happened		Nathan Hasz, Tom Paul, Jeremy Bloom, Esther Regelson, Daniel Ward, Curtis Henderson	Nominated	
2019	Our Planet	"Frozen Worlds"	Kate Hopkins, Tim Owens	Nominated	
2020	Cheer	"Daytona"	Logan Byers, Kaleb Klinger, Sean Gray	Nominated	
2020	Tiger King: Murder, Mayhem and Madness	"Cult of Personality"	Ian Cymore, Rachel Wardell, Steve Griffen	Nominated	

=== Mixing ===
Outstanding Sound Mixing for a Comedy or Drama Series (One-Hour)
Year	Program	Episode	Nominees	Result	Ref.
2014	House of Cards	"Chapter 14"	Lorenzo Millan, Nathan Nance, Scott R. Lewis	Won	
2015	House of Cards	"Chapter 27"	Lorenzo Millan, Nathan Nance, Scott R. Lewis	Nominated	
2016	House of Cards	"Chapter 52"	Lorenzo Millan, Nathan Nance, Scott R. Lewis	Nominated	
2017	House of Cards	"Chapter 53"	Lorenzo Millan, Nathan Nance, Scott R. Lewis	Nominated	
2017	Stranger Things	"Chapter Eight: The Upside Down"	Joe Barnett, Adam Jenkins, Chris Durfy, Bill Higley	Nominated	
2018	Stranger Things	"Chapter Eight: The Mind Flayer"	Joe Barnett, Adam Jenkins, Michael P. Clark, Bill Higley	Nominated	
2019	Ozark	"The Badger"	Larry Benjamin, Kevin Valentine, Felipe 'Flip' Borrero, Dave Torres	Nominated	
2020	Ozark	"All In"	Larry Benjamin, Kevin Valentine, Felipe 'Flip' Borrero, Phil McGowan	Nominated	
2020	Stranger Things	"Chapter Eight: The Battle of Starcourt"	Michael Rayle, Mark Patterson, Will Files, Craig Henighan	Nominated	

Outstanding Sound Mixing for a Comedy or Drama Series (Half-Hour) and Animation
Year	Program	Episode	Nominees	Result	Ref.
2017	Master of None	"The Dinner Party"	Joshua Berger, Michael Barosky	Nominated	
2019	The Kominsky Method	"Chapter 1: An Actor Avoids"	Yuri Reese, Bill Smith, Michael Hoffman	Nominated	
2019	Russian Doll	"The Way Out"	Lewis Goldstein, Phil Rosati	Nominated	
2020	The Ranch	"Fadeaway"	Laura L. King, Bob La Masney, Kathy Oldham	Nominated	
2020	Space Force	"Save Epsilon 6!"	Ben Patrick, John W. Cook II, Bill Freesh	Nominated	

Outstanding Sound Mixing for a Limited Series or Movie
Year	Program	Episode	Nominees	Result	Ref.
2019	When They See Us	"Part 4"	Joe DeAngelis, Chris Carpenter, Jan McLaughlin	Nominated	
2020	El Camino: A Breaking Bad Movie		Phillip W. Palmer, Larry Benjamin, Kevin Valentine, Stacy Michaels	Nominated	
2020	Hollywood	"Hooray for Hollywood"	John Bauman, Doug Andham, Joe Earle, Bob Lacivita	Nominated	

Outstanding Sound Mixing for a Nonfiction or Reality Program (Single or Multi-Camera)
Year	Program	Episode	Nominees	Result	Ref.
2016	Making a Murderer	"Lack of Humanity"	Leslie Shatz	Nominated	
2016	What Happened, Miss Simone?		Tony Volante, Tammy Douglas	Nominated	
2017	13th		Jeffrey Perkins	Nominated	
2018	Wild Wild Country	"Part 1"	Chapman Way	Nominated	
2019	Fyre: The Greatest Party That Never Happened		Tom Paul	Nominated	
2019	Our Planet	"One Planet"	Graham Wild	Nominated	
2020	Cheer	"Daytona"	Ryan David Adams	Nominated	
2020	Tiger King: Murder, Mayhem and Madness	"The Noble Thing to Do"	Jose Araujo, Royce Sharp, Jack Neu and Ian Cymore	Nominated	

Outstanding Sound Mixing for a Variety Series or Special
Year	Program	Episode	Nominees	Result	Ref.
2020	Dave Chappelle: Sticks & Stones		Michael Abbott, Brian Riordan, Connor Moore	Nominated	

== Special Visual Effects ==
Outstanding Special Visual Effects
Year	Program	Episode	Nominees	Result	Ref.
2013	Hemlock Grove	"Children of the Night"	Chris John Jones, Jon Massey, Sean Tompkins, Sallyanne Massimini, Michael Kirylo, Jacob Long, Chris Barsamian, Colin Feist, Kyle Spiker	Nominated	
2018	Altered Carbon	"Out of the Past"	Everett Burrell, Tony Meagher, Joel Whist, Jorge Del Valle, Steve Moncur, Christine Lemon, Paul Jones, Antoine Monineau, David Zaretti	Nominated	
2018	Lost in Space	"Danger, Will Robinson"	Jabbar Raisani, Terron Pratt, Marion Spates, Ashley Ward, Niklas Jacobson, Niklas Ström, Joao Sita, Juri Stanossek, Rafael Solórzano	Nominated	
2018	Stranger Things	"Chapter Nine: The Gate"	Paul Graff, Christina Graff, Michael Maher, Fred Raimondi, Seth Hill, Joel Sevilla, Alex Young, Steven Michael Dinozzi, Caius Man	Nominated	
2019	The Umbrella Academy	"The White Violin"	Everett Burrell, Chris White, Jeff Campbell, Sebastien Bergeron, Sean Schur, Steve Dellerson, Libby Hazell, Carrie Richardson, Misato Shinohara	Nominated	
2020	Lost in Space	"Ninety-Seven"	Jabbar Raisani, Terron Pratt, Marion Spates, Niklas Jacobson, Andrew Walker, Juri Stanossek, Dirk Valk, Blaine Lougheed and Paul Benjamin	Nominated	
2020	Stranger Things	"Chapter Eight: The Battle of Starcourt"	Paul Graff, Gayle Busby, Tom Ford, Michael Maher Jr., Martin Pelletier, Berter Orpak, Yvon Jardel, Nathan Arbuckle and Caius Man	Nominated	

Outstanding Special Visual Effects in a Supporting Role
Year	Program	Episode	Nominees	Result	Ref.
2015	Daredevil	"Speak of the Devil"	David Van Dyke, Bryan Godwin, Karl Coyner, Steve J. Sanchez, Julie Long, Neiko Nagy, Moshe Swed, Kjell Strode, Pedro Tarrago	Nominated	
2017	The Crown	"Children of the Night"	Ben Turner, Tom Debenham, Standish Millennas, Kim Phelan, Oliver Cubbage, Lionel Heath, Charlie Bennet, Stephen Smith, Carmine Agnone	Nominated	
2018	The Crown	"Misadventure"	Ben Turner, Standish Millennas, Alison Griffiths, Matthew Bristowe, Iacopo Di Luigi, Garrett Honn, Charlie Bennett, Jenny Gauci, Carmine Agnone	Nominated	

== Stunt Coordination ==
Outstanding Stunt Coordination for a Comedy Series or Variety Program
Year	Program	Nominees	Result	Ref.
2015	Unbreakable Kimmy Schmidt	Jill Brown	Nominated	
2017	Unbreakable Kimmy Schmidt	Jill Brown	Nominated	
2018	GLOW	Shauna Diggins	Won	
2019	GLOW	Shauna Diggins	Won	
2019	Russian Doll	Christopher Place	Nominated	
2020	Space Force	Erik Solky	Nominated	

Outstanding Stunt Coordination for a Drama Series, Limited Series, or Movie
Year	Program	Nominees	Result	Ref.
2016	Marvel's Daredevil	Philip J. Silvera	Nominated	
2017	Marvel's Luke Cage	James Lew	Won	
2018	Marvel's The Punisher	Thom Williams	Nominated	
2020	Stranger Things	Hiro Koda	Nominated	

== Technical Direction ==
Outstanding Technical Direction, Camerawork, Video Control for a Limited Series, Movie, or Special
Year	Program	Nominees	Result	Ref.
2020	Dave Chappelle: Sticks & Stones	Jon Pretnar, Ruben Avendano, Daniel Balton, Mano Bonilla, Eli Clarke, Helene Haviland, Ed Horton, Lyn Noland, JR Reid, Ronald N. Travisano	Nominated	

== Writing ==
In 2016, Making a Murderer won for Outstanding Writing for a Nonfiction Programming for its first season. 13th, written by Ava DuVernay and Spencer Averick, won in 2017; Amanda Knox and Bill Nye Saves the World were also nominated. The following year, Icarus scored a nomination while the series Our Planet was nominated in 2019. In 2020, Don't F**k with Cats: Hunting an Internet Killer won; Circus of Books was also nominated.

Outstanding Writing for a Nonfiction Programming
Year	Program	Episode	Nominees	Result	Ref.
2016	Making a Murderer	"Eighteen Years Lost"	Moira Demos and Laura Ricciardi	Won	
2017	13th		Spencer Averick and Ava DuVernay	Won	
2017	Amanda Knox		Matthew Hamachek and Brian McGinn	Nominated	
2017	Bill Nye Saves the World	"The Sexual Spectrum"	Mike Drucker, Flora Lichtman, CeCe Pleasants, Sanden Totten, and Prashanth Venkataramanujam	Nominated	
2018	Icarus		Jon Bertain, Bryan Fogel, and Mark Monroe	Nominated	
2019	Our Planet	"Jungles"	David Attenborough, Huw Cordey, Alastair Fothergill, and Keith Scholey	Nominated	
2020	Circus of Books		Rachel Mason and Kathryn Robson	Nominated	
2020	Don't F**k with Cats: Hunting an Internet Killer	"Closing the Net"	Mark Lewis	Won	

In 2016, Patton Oswalt won for his special Patton Oswalt: Talking for Clapping, meanwhile John Mulaney was nominated for John Mulaney: The Comeback Kid. In 2017, Louis C.K. and Sarah Silverman were nominated for their own individual specials. In 2018, John Mulaney won for his special John Mulaney: Kid Gorgeous at Radio City; Patton Oswalt: Annihilation (by Patton Oswalt) and Steve Martin & Martin Short: An Evening You Will Forget for the Rest of Your Life (by Steve Martin and Martin Short) were also nominated. In 2019 and 2020, out of five nominated Netflix specials, Hannah Gadsby and Dave Chappelle won for writing their respective specials.

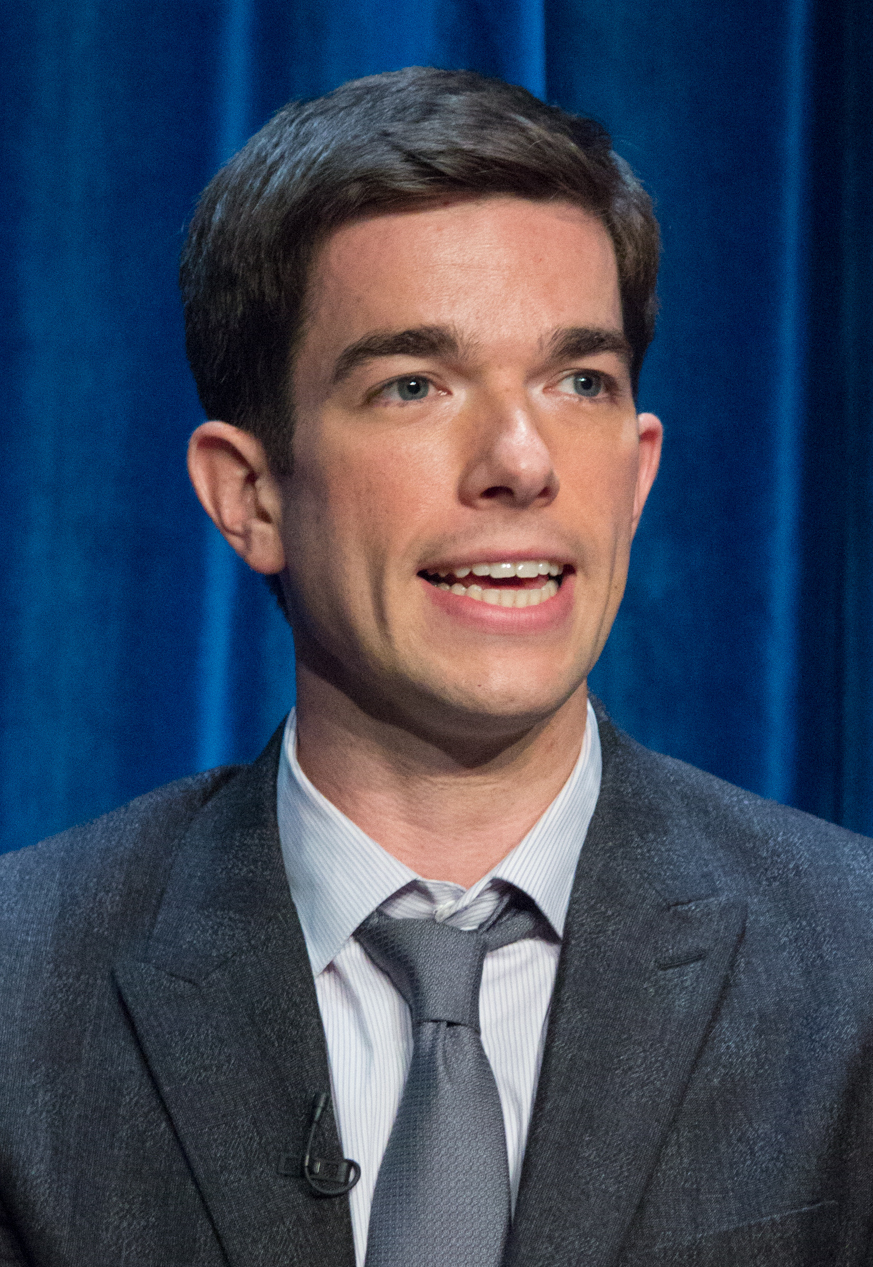
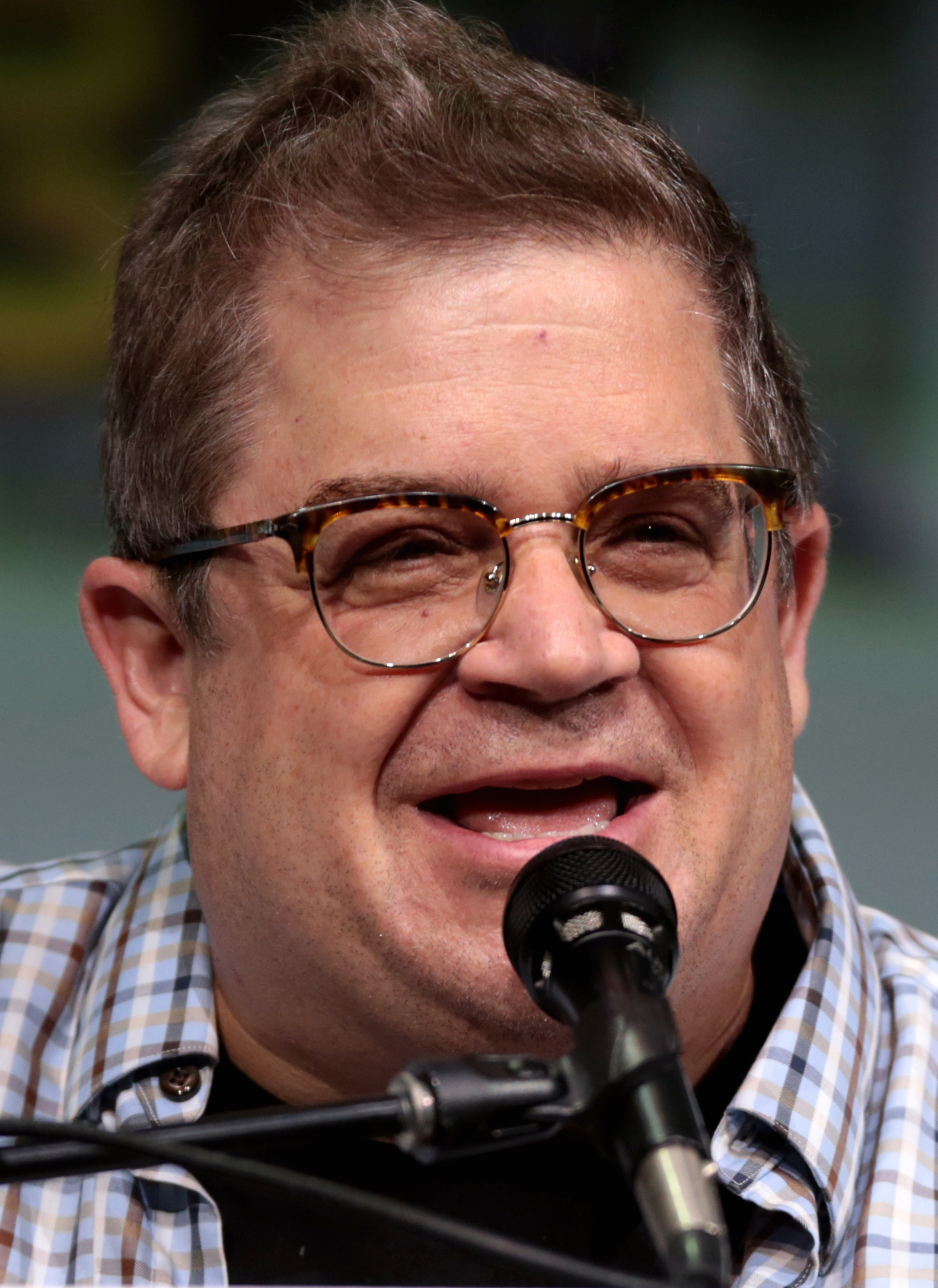
Both John Mulaney and Patton Oswalt received three nominations for Outstanding Writing for a Variety Special, each winning once; Mulaney in 2018 and Oswalt in 2016.
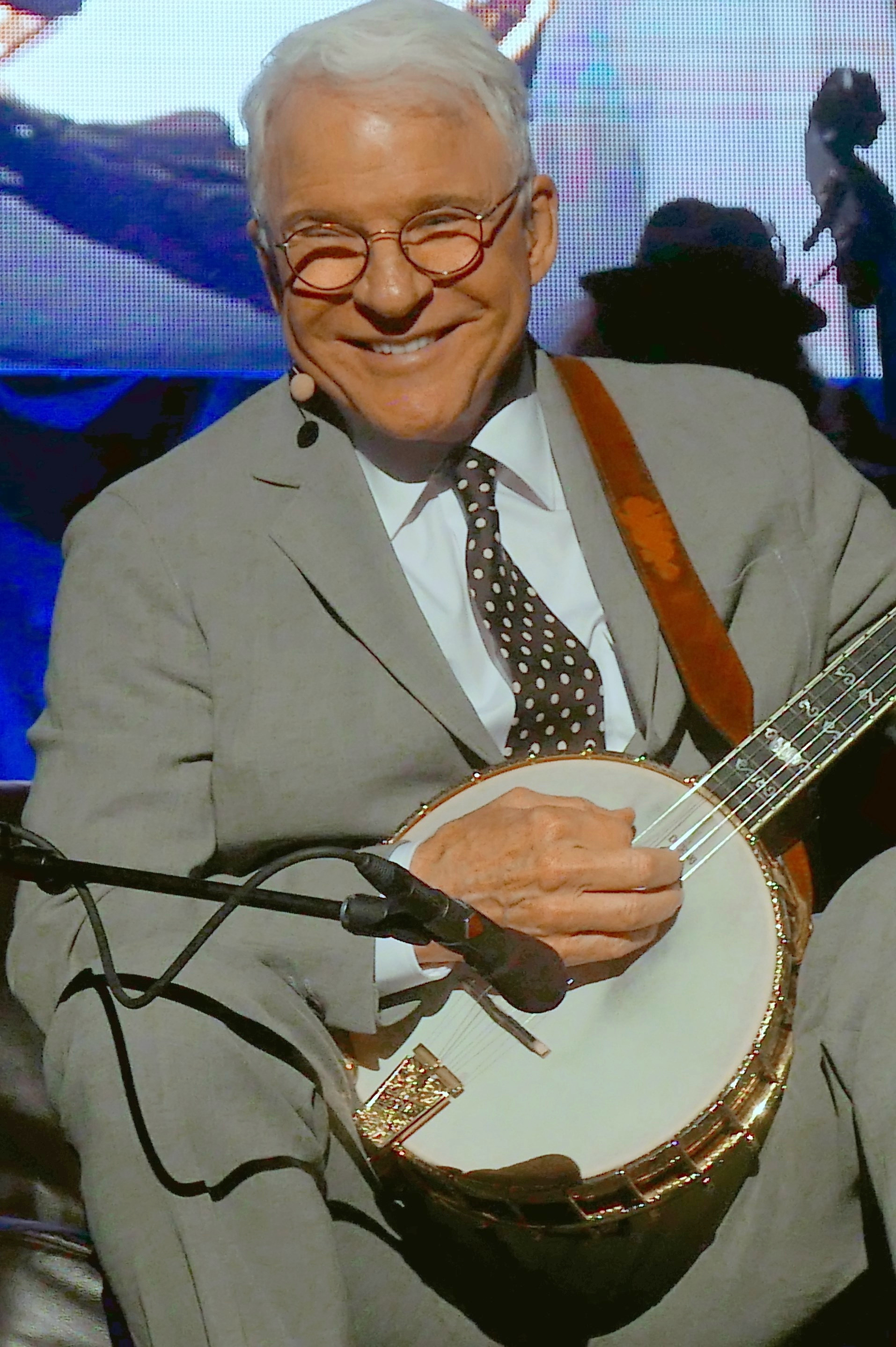
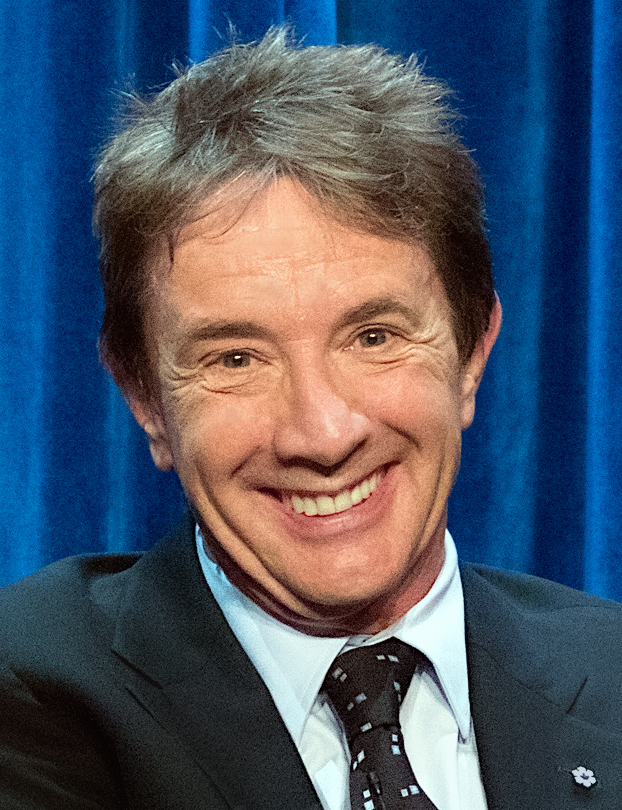
In 2018, Steve Martin and Martin Short received a nomination for writing Steve Martin & Martin Short: An Evening You Will Forget for the Rest of Your Life.

Outstanding Writing for a Variety Special
Year	Program	Nominees	Result	Ref.
2016	John Mulaney: The Comeback Kid	John Mulaney	Nominated	
2016	Patton Oswalt: Talking for Clapping	Patton Oswalt	Won	
2017	Louis C.K. 2017	Louis C.K.	Nominated	
2017	Sarah Silverman: A Speck of Dust	Sarah Silverman	Nominated	
2018	John Mulaney: Kid Gorgeous at Radio City	John Mulaney	Won	
2018	Patton Oswalt: Annihilation	Patton Oswalt	Nominated	
2018	Steve Martin & Martin Short: An Evening You Will Forget for the Rest of Your Life	Steve Martin and Martin Short	Nominated	
2019	Adam Sandler: 100% Fresh	Adam Sandler	Nominated	
2019	Amy Schumer Growing	Amy Schumer	Nominated	
2019	Hannah Gadsby: Nanette	Hannah Gadsby	Won	
2019	Homecoming: A Film by Beyoncé	Beyoncé Knowles-Carter	Nominated	
2019	Wanda Sykes: Not Normal	Wanda Sykes	Nominated	
2020	Dave Chappelle: Sticks & Stones	Dave Chappelle	Won	
2020	Hannah Gadsby: Douglas	Hannah Gadsby	Nominated	
2020	John Mulaney & the Sack Lunch Bunch	John Mulaney and Marika Sawyer	Nominated	
2020	Patton Oswalt: I Love Everything	Patton Oswalt	Nominated	
2020	Seth Meyers: Lobby Baby	Seth Meyers	Nominated	

== See also ==
- List of accolades received by Netflix
- List of Primetime Emmy Awards received by Netflix
