= James Joyce Award =

University College Dublin award

The James Joyce Award, also known as the Honorary Fellowship of the Society, is an award given by the Literary and Historical Society (L&H) of University College Dublin (UCD) for those who have achieved outstanding success in their given field. Past recipients include academics, political figures, actors and writers. It is named in honour of the society's best-known alumni, James Joyce, the author of Dubliners, A Portrait of the Artist as a Young Man, Ulysses and Finnegans Wake.

Joyce was a student at University College, the predecessor of UCD, from 1898 to 1903, where he studied modern languages. In 1900, he presented a paper "Drama and Life" to the society. He also ran for the top position of auditor, but failed to be elected.

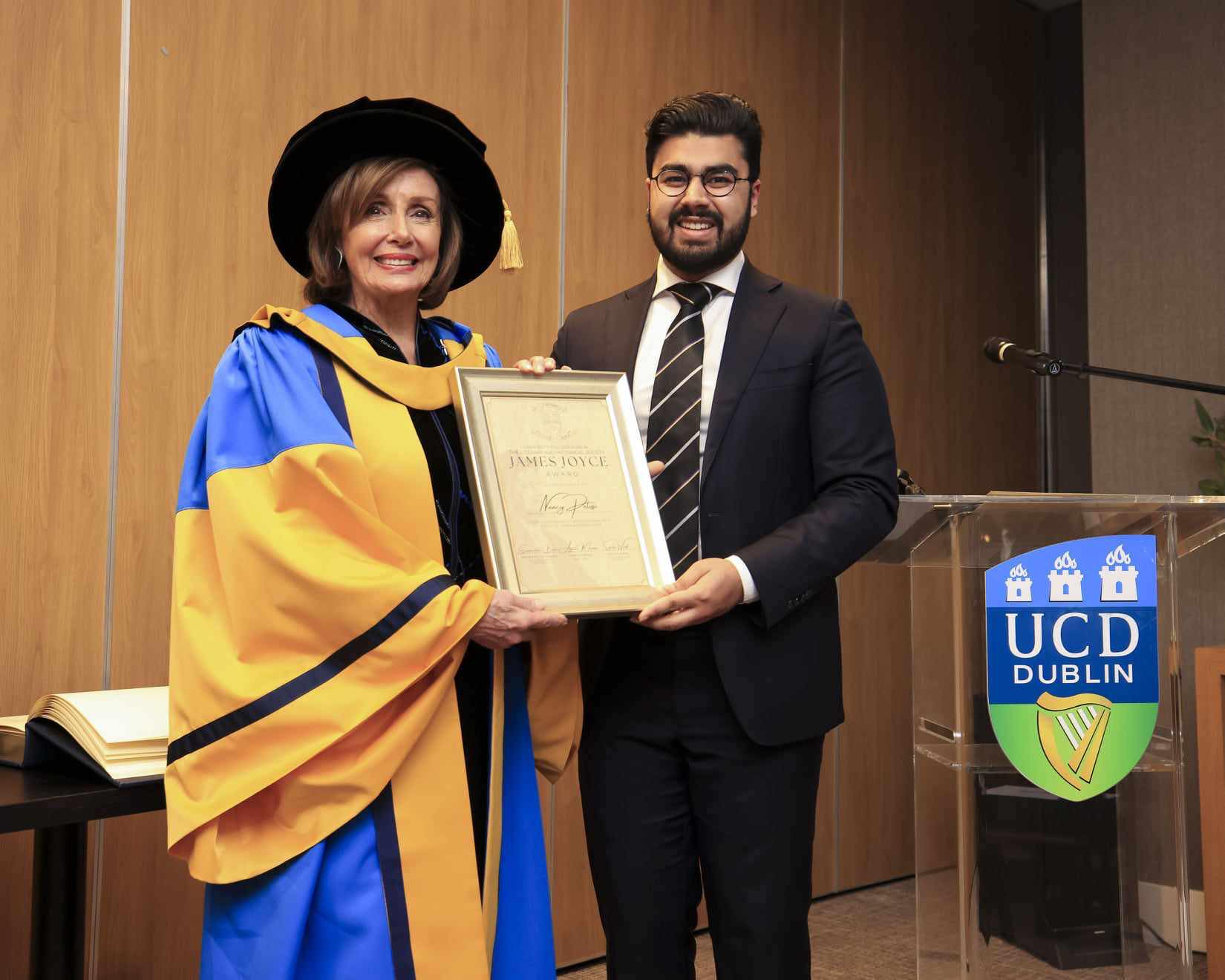
Nancy Pelosi receiving the James Joyce Award

== Recipients ==
=== Actors ===
- Rory Bremner – British satirist
- Aaron Eckhart – Actor
- Will Ferrell – Comedian and actor
- Ralph Fiennes – Actor
- Neil Flynn – Actor
- Martin Freeman – Actor
- Tom Felton – Actor and musician
- Barry Humphries – Actor and comedian
- Eddie Izzard – Comedian
- Shappi Khorsandi – Comedian
- Sam Lloyd – Actor
- Michael Palin – Comedian, member of the Monty Python comedy group
- Alan Rickman – Actor
- Robert Sheehan – Actor
- Michael Sheen – Actor
- Erik Per Sullivan – Actor
- Kristian Nairn – Actor
- Jane Lynch – Actress
- Patrick J. Adams – Actor
- Brenda Fricker – Actress
- Ardal O'Hanlon – Actor and comedian
- Stephen Fry – Actor and comedian

=== Musicians ===
- Alt-J – English indie rock band
- Roger Daltrey – Lead singer of British rock band The Who
- George Martin – Producer of The Beatles
- Emeli Sandé – Scottish recording artist and songwriter
- Jack White – American recording artist and songwriter, and member of The White Stripes, The Raconteurs and The Dead Weather
- Picture This – Irish pop rock band
- Danny O'Donoghue – Irish musician and singer-songwriter
- Imogen Heap – British electropop musician

=== Political figures ===
- Hans Blix – Former Chief UN Weapons inspector
- Robin Cook – British politician
- F.W. de Klerk – Former South African President
- John Howard – Former Australian Prime Minister
- John Hume – Nobel Laureate and Northern Irish politician
- Jesse Jackson – US Civil Rights Advocate
- Alastair Campbell – Journalist and Director of Communications and Strategy for Tony Blair
- Patrick Leahy – Former U.S. Senator
- Alaa Murabit – UN High-Level Commissioner and Sustainable Development Goals Advocate
- David Norris – Former Senator and gay rights advocate
- Rory O'Neill – Drag queen and gay rights activist
- John Bercow – Former Speaker of the House of Commons of the United Kingdom
- Brian Schweitzer – Former Governor of Montana
- Desmond Tutu – Human rights activist
- Nancy Pelosi – Former Speaker of the U.S. House of Representatives
- Al Sharpton – Minister and civil rights activist
- Martin Dempsey – Former U.S. Army General and Chairman of the Joint Chiefs of Staff
- Eamon Ryan – Former leader of The Green Party and Government Minister
- Peter Tatchell – Australian-British LGBTQ+ rights activist

=== Scientists and academics ===
- Noam Chomsky – Linguist and activist
- Robert Gallo – Biomedical researcher
- Paul Krugman – Economist
- John Nash – Nobel Laureate and mathematician
- Johan Norberg – Swedish historian and writer
- Richard Swinburne – British philosopher
- Kip Thorne – Theoretical physicist
- Gabriele Veneziano – Physicist
- Steven Weinberg – Physicist

=== Sportspeople ===
- Paul O'Connell – Ireland rugby player
- Gary Lineker – Television host and former England soccer captain
- Niall Quinn – Irish international football player and Sunderland FC Chairman
- Tony Hawk – Skateboarder
- Alex Ferguson – Manchester United manager
- Ken Doherty – World Snooker Champion
- Lawrie Sanchez – Northern Ireland manager
- Pádraig Harrington – Irish golfer
- Daniel Wiffen – Irish Olympic Gold Medalist Swimmer
- Eddie Jordan - Irish racing driver, motorsport executive, founder and team principal of Jordan Grand Prix in Formula One, broadcaster, and businessman
- Judit Polgár - Hungarian chess grandmaster

=== Writers ===
- Bill Bryson – Writer
- J.K. Rowling – Writer of the Harry Potter series
- Neil Gaiman – Writer of the Sandman series, Coraline, American Gods
- DBC Pierre – Writer and Booker Prize winner
- Salman Rushdie – Writer and Booker Prize winner
- Sue Townsend – Writer
- Yu Hua – Writer
- Seamus Heaney – Poet and Nobel Laureate
- Roddy Doyle – Author
- Liz Nugent – Writer
- Michael Lewis – Author and financial journalist
- Louise O'Neill – Writer
- Jeffrey Archer - Writer
- Lisa McGee - Writer of Derry Girls

=== Other ===
- Jenna Mourey – YouTube celebrity
- Brandon Stanton – Street photographer, Humans of New York
- Steve Schapiro – Photographer
- Laura Ricciardi – Filmmaker
- Moira Demos – Filmmaker
- Joe Randazzo – Former editor-in-chief of the Onion
- Grace Beverley – Founder & CEO of fitness brands Tala and Shreddy
- Vincent Browne – Journalist
- Brian O'Donovan – Journalist
- Danny Boyle – Director
- Ryan Tubridy - Broadcaster
