= Laura Ricciardi =

American Filmmaker (b. 1970)

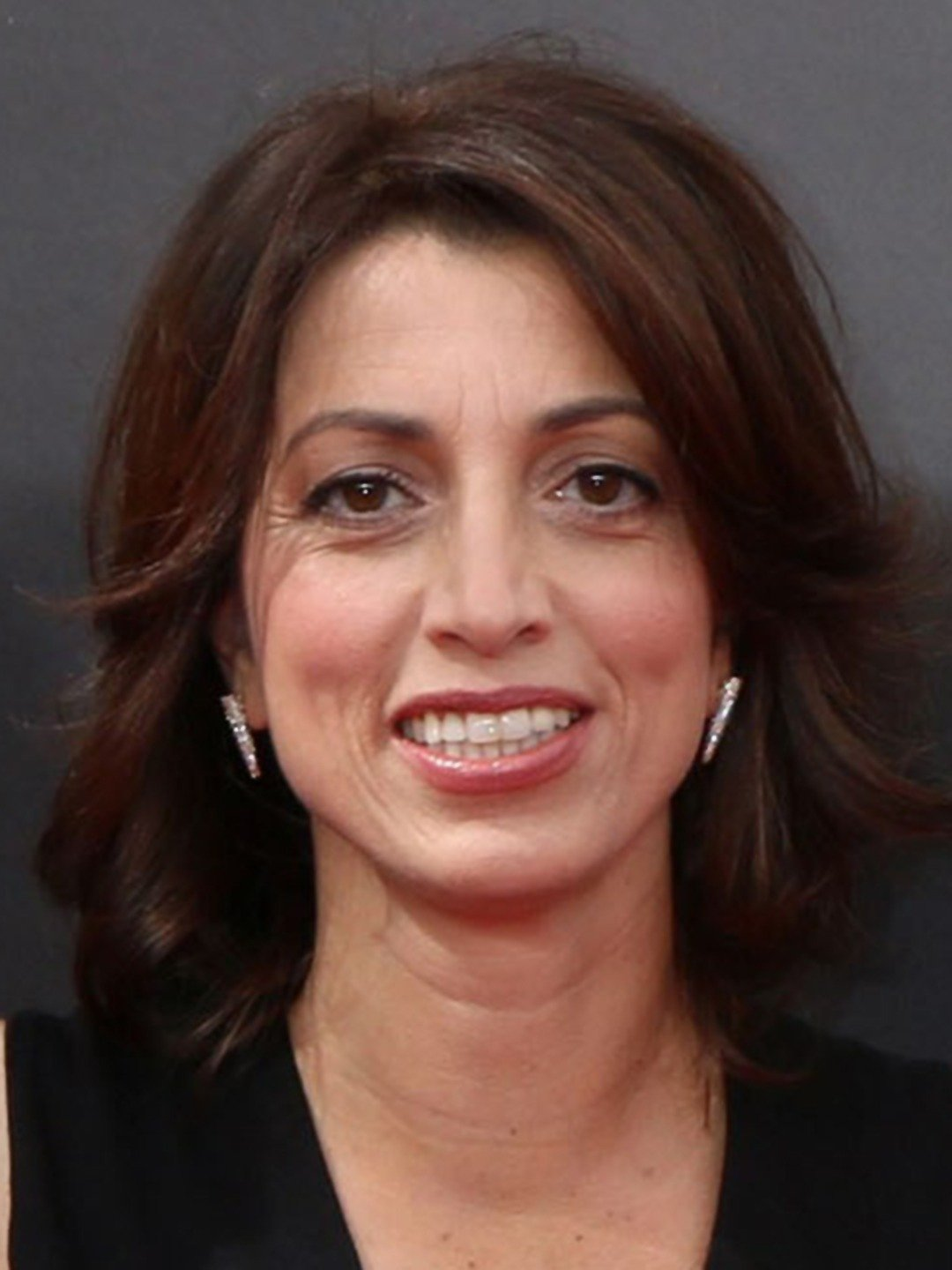
- Born: 1970 (age 55–56)
- Education: Manhattan College (BA); New York Law School (JD); Columbia University School of the Arts (MFA in Film)
- Notable work: Making a Murderer Seasons 1 & 2
- Awards: Primetime Creative Arts Emmy Awards (3)

Laura Ricciardi (born 1970) is an American filmmaker. Ricciardi is best known for the Netflix documentary television series Making a Murderer, which she cocreated with filmmaker Moira Demos. Along with Demos, Ricciardi served as executive producer, writer and director for all 20 episodes of the series. At the 68th Annual Primetime Creative Arts Emmy Awards in 2016, Making a Murderer received nine nominations and won Emmy Awards for Outstanding Documentary or Nonfiction Series, Outstanding Writing for a Nonfiction Program, and Outstanding Directing for a Nonfiction Program.

== Career ==
Prior to working in film, Ricciardi practiced law in the public and private sectors. Ricciardi served as an attorney trainee in the United States Department of Justice's Attorney General’s Honors Program (Federal Bureau of Prisons). Ricciardi was an associate in the Chicago office of Vedder Price Kaufman & Kammholz P.C. Later, while she and Demos sought a distributor for Making a Murderer, she worked as a contract attorney at Quinn Emanuel Urquhart & Sullivan, LLP in the law firm’s New York City and Los Angeles offices.

Ricciardi and Demos were graduate film students at Columbia University School of the Arts when they first read about Steven Avery in The New York Times. Two months later, in January 2006, Ricciardi and Demos founded the New York-based production company Synthesis Films LLC that produced Making a Murderer. For more than eight years, Ricciardi and Demos worked independently on the first season of Making a Murderer, which ultimately took 10 years to complete.

The first season of Making a Murderer launched on Netflix on December 18, 2015. The series was critically acclaimed and became a global phenomenon. The second season launched on Netflix on October 19, 2018. Each season of the series contains 10 episodes.

== Honors and awards ==
As cocreator, executive producer, writer and director of Making a Murderer, Ricciardi won awards (all shared with Demos) from numerous organizations including the Academy of Television Arts & Sciences, the Television Critics Association, the International Documentary Association, the Producers Guild of America, Cinema Eye, the International Academy of Digital Arts and Sciences, the Banff World Media Festival, the Online Film & Television Association, the University College Dublin Literary & Historical Society, the American Bar Association and the National Council on Crime and Delinquency.

In 2017, Ricciardi received an honorary doctor of law degree from New York Law School.

=== Honors & Awards ===
| 68th Annual Primetime Creative Arts Emmy Awards (2016) | Outstanding Documentary Or Nonfiction Series | Making a Murderer Netflix; A Synthesis Films Production for Netflix; Laura Ricciardi, Executive Producer; Moira Demos, Executive Producer |
| 68th Annual Primetime Creative Arts Emmy Awards (2016) | Outstanding Writing For A Nonfiction Program | Making A Murderer "Eighteen Years Lost"; Netflix; A Synthesis Films Production for Netflix; Laura Ricciardi, Written by Moira Demos, Written by |
| 68th Annual Primetime Creative Arts Emmy Awards (2016) | Outstanding Directing For A Nonfiction Program | Making A Murderer "Fighting For Their Lives"; Netflix; A Synthesis Films Production for Netflix; Laura Ricciardi, Directed by Moira Demos, Directed by |
| 32nd Annual Television Critics Association Awards (2016) | Outstanding Achievement in Reality Programming | Making a Murderer (Netflix) |
| 32nd Annual International Documentary Association (IDA) Awards (2016) | Best Limited Series Award | Making a Murderer Executive Producers: Moira Demos and Laura Ricciardi Netflix |
| 28th Annual Producers Guild of America (PGA) Awards (2017) | Outstanding Producer of Non-Fiction Television | Making a Murderer Laura Ricciardi, Moira Demos Season 1 |
| 10th Annual Cinema Eye Honors Awards (2017) | Outstanding Achievement in Nonfiction Films Made for Television | "Making a Murderer" (Laura Ricciardi and Moira Demos) |
| 20th Annual Webby Awards (2016) | Webby Special Achievement Award, Film & Video Breakout of the Year | Moira Demos & Laura Ricciardi for writing and directing "Making a Murderer" |
| American Bar Association (ABA) Silver Gavel Awards for Media and the Arts (2016) | Silver Gavel Award for Documentaries | Making a Murderer Codirected by Laura Ricciardi and Moira Demos for Netflix |
| National Council on Crime and Delinquency, Media for a Just Society (2016) | Distinguished Achievement Award | Moira Demos and Laura Ricciardi, creators of Netflix’s Making a Murderer |
| Columbia University Film Festival (2018) | 18th Annual Andrew Sarris Award | Laura Ricciardi (Film ’07) and Moira Demos (Film ’08) |
| Banff World Media Festival Rockie Awards (2016) | Program of the Year | Making a Murderer |
| University College Dublin, Literary and Historical Society | James Joyce Award for Human Endeavour | Laura Ricciardi & Moira Demos |
| Online Film & Television Association, 20th Annual TV Awards (2015-16) | Best Reality Or Non-Fiction Program | Making a Murderer |
| Online Film & Television Association, 20th Annual TV Awards (2015-16) | Best Writing Of A Reality Or Non-Fiction Program | Making a Murderer |

=== Nominations ===
| 32nd Annual Television Critics Association Awards (2016) | Program of the Year | “The Americans,” FX “Fargo,” FX “Game of Thrones,” HBO “Making a Murderer,” Netflix “Mr. Robot,” USA “The People v. O.J. Simpson: American Crime Story,” FX (WINNER) “UnREAL,” Lifetime |
| British Academy of Film and Television Arts (BAFTA), House of Fraser British Academy Television Awards (2016) | RadioTimes Audience Award | The Great British Bake Off Poldark (WINNER) Making a Murderer Doctor Foster Peter Kay's Car Share Humans |
| Critics Choice Association, 3rd Annual Critics Choice Documentary Awards (2018) | Best Ongoing Documentary Series | 30 for 30 American Masters Anthony Bourdain: Parts Unknown (WINNER) Frontline Independent Lens Making a Murderer POV The History of Comedy |
| Critics Choice Association, Inaugural Critics Choice Real TV Awards (2019) | Crime/Justice Show | Betrayed (ID) Conversations with a Killer: The Ted Bundy Tapes (Netflix) (WINNER) In Pursuit with John Walsh (ID) Making a Murderer: Part 2 (Netflix) The Innocent Man (Netflix) |
| 21st Annual Jameson Empire Awards (2016) | Best Documentary | Amy (WINNER) Going Clear: Scientology and the Prison of Belief He Named Me Malala The Jinx: The Life and Deaths of Robert Durst Making a Murderer |
| GALECA, The Society of LGBTQ Entertainment Critics, Dorian Awards (2016) | Documentary of the Year (theatrical release, TV airing or DVD release) | Amy / A24 (WINNER) Best of Enemies / Magnolia Pictures, Magnet Going Clear: Scientology and the Prison of Belief / HBO Making a Murderer / Netflix What Happened, Miss Simone? / Netflix |

== Education ==
In 1992, Ricciardi received a Bachelor of Arts magna cum laude from Manhattan College where she double-majored in English and government. Ricciardi was inducted into The Phi Beta Kappa Society (ΦΒΚ) and was selected to deliver the commencement address to the college’s Class of 1992. Ricciardi played Division I softball for the Manhattan College Jaspers and was named to the Academic All-America 2nd Team (1991, catcher).

In 1996, Ricciardi received a Juris Doctor cum laude from New York Law School, where she served as an Articles Editor of The New York Law School Law Review. For a case comment she wrote for the Law Review, Ricciardi was honored with an Otto L. Walter Distinguished Writing Award (Student Award, Day Division) for Outstanding Published Scholarly Writing. Ricciardi was a research assistant to NYLS professor Michael B.W. Sinclair, with whom she co-authored an article that was published in The University of Toledo Law Review. During law school, she served as a summer law clerk for the U.S. Attorney’s Office, District of Hawaii, Honolulu, HI.

In 2007, Ricciardi received a Master of Fine Arts in film from Columbia University School of the Arts. She was honored twice with the Victoria Loconsolo Foundation Fellowship Screenwriting Award (2003 & 2004).
