= Kevin Hart: Don't F**k This Up =

2019 documentary television series

- Genre: Documentary
- Composers: Roahn Hylton; Jacob Yoffee
- Country of origin: United States
- Original language: English
- No. of seasons: 1
- No. of episodes: 6

Production
- Executive producers: Dave Becky; Kevin Hart; Russell Heldt; Casey Kriley; Alexandra Marks; Angus Wall
- Running time: 25–36 minutes
- Production companies: Lionsgate Television; HartBeat Productions; 3 Arts Entertainment; Magical Elves; MakeMake

Original release
- Network: Netflix
- Release: December 27, 2019

Kevin Hart: Don't F**k This Up is a 2019 documentary streaming television series starring Kevin Hart. The premise revolves around Kevin Hart and his journey to the point of his Oscar scandal in 2018 and the controversy surrounding it.

== Cast ==
- Kevin Hart

== Episodes ==
=== Season 1 (2019) ===
No.	Title	Original release date
1	"24/Kevin"	December 27, 2019
Months before a public scandal, Kevin Hart offers a glimpse into his ambitious schedule and remembers the woman responsible for his grueling work ethic.
2	"Don't Be a Bitch"	December 27, 2019
Kevin examines his relationship with his father. He also introduces his wife and "road warriors" before getting blindsided by controversy.
3	"What Happened in Vegas"	December 27, 2019
After a public and humiliating mistake, Kevin shares details surrounding the scandal that strained his marriage and brought him closer to his circle.
4	"Bulletproof"	December 27, 2019
Kevin takes ownership of his actions following an intense argument. He then prepares for the release of the first film under his production company.
5	"This Has to Work"	December 27, 2019
While embarking on a global tour, Kevin reflects on his comedic journey and the road to acceptance before receiving the biggest news of his career.
6	"Kingdom of Kevin"	December 27, 2019
Caught in a storm of controversy, Kevin learns a hard lesson in humility and considers the best course of action. Later, hindsight shifts his stance.

== Release ==
Kevin Hart: Don't F**k This Up was released on December 27, 2019, on Netflix.

== Accolades ==
Year	Award	Category	Nominee(s)	Result	Ref.
2020	Primetime Emmy Awards	Outstanding Unstructured Reality Program	Kevin Hart, Dave Becky, Angus Wall, Russell Heldt, Casey Kriley, Alexandra Marks, Rich Eckersley, Allison Klein, Kent Kubena, Terry Leonard and Jennifer Sofio Hall	Nominated	
