= Moira Demos =

American filmmaker, producer and editor

- Education: Columbia University
- Occupations: Filmmaker, film editor
- Known for: Co-producer of the documentary series Making a Murderer
- Partner: Laura Ricciardi

Moira Demos is an American filmmaker, producer and editor. Demos rose to prominence with her documentary Making a Murderer which she co-directed with filmmaker Laura Ricciardi, in a process that took 10 years to complete.

== Film career ==
Before working as a director Demos worked as a film editor and an electrician on the set of films. She is credited as an electrician for the film Pollock based on painter Jackson Pollock's life, and is also credited as an additional electrician on the film You Can Count on Me.

In 2005 Demos and Laura Ricciardi read the article "Freed by DNA, Now Charged in New Crime" in The New York Times. Fascinated by Steven Avery's case, they rented a car and borrowed a camera and began filming the day after they arrived in Wisconsin.

The series premiered on Netflix in December 2015 to positive reviews. Review aggregator site Metacritic awarded it a score of 85 out of 100, indicating majority positive reviews.

Demos won Emmys for her work on Making a Murderer: Outstanding Documentary or Nonfiction Series, Outstanding Directing For Nonfiction Programming, and Outstanding Writing for Nonfiction Programming which she shared with Ricciardi and the Emmy for Outstanding Picture Editing For Nonfiction Programming which she won on her own.

In 2018 Demos and Ricciardi released a second season of Making a Murderer.

== Personal life ==
Demos is a lesbian and is in a long-term relationship with director Laura Ricciardi. She graduated from Columbia University in 1996.
