= Scenes of a Crime =

- Scenes of a Crime 2011 documentary film
- Directed by: Blue Hadaegh
- Produced by: Grover Babcock
- Cinematography: Brian Mulchy; David E. Elkins
- Edited by: Robert De Maio
- Production company: New Box Productions
- Distributed by: Submarine Entertainment
- Release dates: April 16, 2011 (Full Frame Documentary Film Festival); March 30, 2012 (United States)
- Running time: 88 minutes
- Country: United States
- Language: English

Scenes of a Crime is a documentary film that focuses on the case of Adrian P. Thomas who was the subject of nearly 10 hours of interrogation by Troy, New York police, culminating in a controversial confession and high profile murder trial. The film won multiple festival awards, a Gotham Award for "Best Film Not Playing At Theater Near You," played theatrically and was broadcast nationally. Reviews of the film were highly favorable.

== Background ==
Producer/Directors Grover Babcock and Blue Hadaegh were interested in making a documentary about the psychology of modern police interrogation, and the risks of false confession. They sought a case that featured an extensive video-recording of a long interrogation that culminated in a dispute over the confession. Since many police departments do not routinely record full interrogations, and instead record conversations only once a suspect has agreed to confess, it was difficult to locate a suitable case. Eventually, they learned of the video-recorded interrogation of Adrian P. Thomas, a 26-year-old father from Troy, New York. Local police had interrogated Thomas for nearly 10 hours in 2008, after they were told, mistakenly, by medical staff at Albany Medical Center that Thomas's dying son Matthew showed clear evidence of a "shaken baby" type attack. Over successive rounds of intense psychological manipulation, including lies about evidence against him, and promises of leniency, Troy detectives eventually convinced Thomas to confess to harming his son; crucially, they threatened to pursue Thomas's wife as a suspect if he didn't comply, and assured him that he would spend no time in jail for an "accidental" attack. Detectives then acted out an attack scenario for him, which Thomas then demonstrated. Thomas signed a statement written by police, and was surprised he was then arrested. He soon recanted his confession. All of the interrogation room activity was secretly video-recorded by police. The documentary inspired high profile organizations such as the Legal Aid Society, Center on Wrongful Convictions and the Innocence Project to support Thomas's appeal. After a setback in New York's 3rd Appellate Department, Thomas won his appeal to the New York Court of Appeals based on a coercive interrogation, resulting in an order for a new trial. The Court said the police methods "raised a substantial risk of false incrimination." On June 12, 2014, in the second trial, Thomas was found not guilty for the second degree murder of his infant son Matthew Thomas, and immediately freed.

== Subject matter ==
Kid Pan Alley began back in 1999 in Rappahannock County, Virginia when Reisler conducted the initial Kid Pan Alley residency with a local elementary school where he wrote over 50 songs with 600 children. Specifically, in the Thomas case the film pushes against the assumption that innocent people will not confess to a crime that they did not commit. The documentary is largely based on a nearly 10-hour videotaped interrogation of Adrian P. Thomas over a two-day period in September 2008 by Troy, New York, police officers. The technique of interrogation seems to closely follow the Reid Technique, which is a long-established nine-step procedure that uses psychological manipulation to extract a confession. While sequences of video from this interrogation are at the center of this documentary, there are also interviews with key individuals in the case. These interviews include the police officers who conducted the interrogation, the prosecuting district attorney, the defense attorneys, two of the jurors, and expert witnesses. One of the jurors interviewed for the film stated after the trial: "We saw the video. You could just tell that he was guilty."

According to Kenneth Turan, writing for the Los Angeles Times, the most noteworthy aspect of this case was how it began with scant evidence. When the police went to the hospital, Dr. Walter Edge (who declined to participate in the film) told them that Thomas' infant son had died of a fractured skull and told them "somebody murdered this child." The police shortly thereafter assumed the injury was caused by Adrian Thomas and proceeded to extract a confession from him. Subsequent examination found no skull fracture and found inconclusive evidence for a high-impact head injury.

== Critical reception ==
Eric Hynes, writing for Time Out, opines that while the film addresses the issue of legally sanctioned coercion in police interrogations, it does not address issues of how race affected the verdict in the trial. Writing for The Village Voice, Mark Holcomb says that "What's remarkable about Scenes of a Crime, besides Hadaegh and Babcock's ability to stay out of the way of their story and resist flashy graphical flourishes, is the degree to which the events it reveals are business as usual." Nick Schager, writing for Slant Magazine, states that the "film is an impressive piece of reportage free of overt or pushy bias, with equal time granted to Adrian's defense team." Eddie Cockrell writing for Variety points out that "Blue Hadaegh and Grover Babcock borrow liberally from the Errol Morris nonfiction playbook; as imitation is the sincerest form of flattery..."

== Awards ==
In 2011, Scenes of a Crime won a Gotham Award for "Best Film Not Playing At Theater Near You". In December 2012, however, it was broadcast nationally in the United States by MSNBC. The documentary also won the Full Frame Documentary Film Festival's grand jury award.
