= Adrian P. Thomas =

Wrongfully convicted American

Adrian P. Thomas was a father of seven children living in Troy, New York, when, in September 2008, his four-month-old son died. A preliminary medical examination indicated that the infant died from head trauma. The police interrogated Thomas for nearly 10 hours during which he confessed to throwing his son on the bed three times. The entire interrogation was videotaped. He was charged with second-degree murder, found guilty, and sentenced to 25 years to life in prison.

In 2011, Grover Babcock and Blue Hadaegh were looking for an example of a coerced confession as the basis for a documentary film they were planning and they used Thomas's interrogation video to make the documentary Scenes of a Crime. Thomas appealed his conviction based on a coercive interrogation. However, the state appellate justices of New York denied his appeal in 2012. Thomas then appealed his conviction to the New York Court of Appeals. In February 2014, the seven judges unanimously ruled that Thomas must have another trial excluding the videotaped confession. A second trial was held and on June 12, 2014, the jury found him not guilty of second degree murder of his infant son. The case created controversy about how much coercion is legally permissible in police interrogations.

== Background ==
In September 2008, Thomas was 26 years old, unemployed, and the father of seven children living in Troy, New York. According to his relatives, he moved to Troy from Douglas, Georgia, after he married Wilhelmina Hicks. On September 23, 2008, Thomas's son Mathew Thomas was approximately four months old when he was pronounced brain dead in a hospital in Troy, and subsequently died in Albany Medical Center Hospital. A doctor at the hospital told police that Mathew died of head injuries that he had sustained. Because of the doctor's report, police began questioning Thomas about the circumstances of his son's death, claiming that an adult must have physically hurt his son: specifically, either Thomas or his wife.

Thomas initially denied that he had done anything to his son that could have caused his head injuries. Towards the end of a nearly 10-hour interrogation, Thomas, although continuing to claim innocence, stated he would take the blame if something had accidentally happened to the child. As police continued to press for responses that fit with a physical injury, Thomas confessed to throwing Mathew on to the bed three times and the interrogation ended. He told police he had been fighting with his wife and had thrown his son on the bed out of frustration. He then signed a confession.

== First trial ==
The same doctor who had initially reported to police that Thomas's son had died of head trauma found at a subsequent medical examination no evidence of a skull fracture, and determined the cause of death to be sepsis. Nevertheless, Thomas's trial for second degree murder began in October 2009. The prosecution built their case around the videotaped confession Thomas gave police. They showed the jury the taped demonstration of Thomas throwing an object on the floor to illustrate how he threw his son onto the bed. This was the first time a videotaped confession had been shown to a jury in Rensselaer County, New York.

In his testimony to the jury, Thomas told the jurors that the admissions of guilt he made during the interrogation were all lies. He said he told the police that he weighed 500 pounds (230 kg) when he actually weighed 350 pounds (160 kg). He also denied hitting his son's head with his head, hitting his son's head against the rail of the crib, and throwing his son on the bed three times. He said that he lied to the police during the interrogation because the police kept repeating that he had injured his son and because he wanted to get out of the interrogation so that he could go to the hospital and see his son and wife.

On October 22, 2009, Professor Richard Ofshe, an expert on false confessions during police interrogations, testified at a hearing that after reviewing the taped confession, he concluded that Thomas's confession fit his model of false confessions. However, after hearing the testimony of Professor Paul Cassell, who stated that there was little empirical evidence to back up Ofshe's theory of false confessions, Judge Andrew Ceresia denied the defense's request to call Ofshe to testify. The jury subsequently found Thomas guilty of second degree murder and judge Andrew Ceresia sentenced Thomas to 25 years to life in prison.

== Scenes of a Crime ==
Grover Babcock and Blue Hadaegh are independent documentary producers. They were interested in the phenomenon of false confession during police interrogation. They wanted to document with a real case the kind of interrogation process that could produce false confessions. They began searching for video of an entire police interrogation, which turned out to be difficult to find until they came across the videotape of Thomas's confession. They subsequently produced a documentary film, Scenes of a Crime, using video from the Thomas interrogation to illustrate what can happen during police interrogations.

== Appeals ==
Thomas's appeal was mainly based on the interrogation techniques used. On March 22, 2012, the state appellate justices of New York denied Thomas's appeal. They concluded:

The video confirms that defendant was never—at any time—handcuffed or restrained, frisked or placed under arrest, physically or verbally abused, threatened or mistreated; he was not told he had to remain or prevented from leaving ... He was repeatedly offered food, beverages and bathroom breaks, which he declined, and his numerous requests for cigarettes were honored.

The appeal then moved to the New York Court of Appeals. On February 20, 2014, the seven-member appeals court unanimously ruled that Thomas's interrogation went too far and that the videotaped confession should not have been shown to the jury. Chief Judge Jonathan Lippman, writing for the majority, concluded that "What transpired during defendant’s interrogation was not consonant with, and indeed completely undermined, defendant’s right not to incriminate himself—to remain silent". They ordered a new trial and ruled that the taped confession could not be shown to the jury.

== Second trial ==
On May 27, 2014, the second trial for Thomas, now 32 years old, began, again with a charge of second degree murder of his infant son. Because the videotaped interrogation was inadmissible in the second trial, much of the prosecution and defense testimony focused on the cause of death of four-month-old Mathew Thomas. Rensselaer County Medical Examiner Dr. Michael Sikirica told the jury that the infant had subdural hematomas, which are often cause in infants by head injuries resulting from violent shaking. Chicago specialist Dr. Jan Leestma told the jury that the infant died of septic shock due to a bacterial infection. Child abuse expert Dr. Patrick Barnes told the jury that the CT scans that he examined of brain swelling and blood on the brain of the infant were old and could have occurred at child birth. He told the jury that the infant was born premature and was also a twin, which placed him at greater risk for bleeding of the brain.

In closing arguments, Rensselaer County Assistant District Attorney Christa Book argued that Thomas bounced the infant on the bed until he fell on the ground causing head trauma, which killed him. Defense attorney Steve Coffey countered that Dr. Edge, who treated the infant at the hospital, did not testify and neither did neuroradiologist Dr. Hoover. Coffey suggested to the jury that they did not testify because the prosecution did not like what they had to say. Book objected to Coffey's suggestions, saying that they were "ridiculous," but her objections were overruled by Judge Andrew Ceresia. Defense attorney Coffey also questioned the testimony of convicted felon William Terry, who testified that Thomas had confessed to him while they were both in prison. Finally, Coffey reminded the jury that despite hearing terms such as "wicked, evil, inhuman, brutal, despicable, wanton" during the trial, they had to be convinced by the evidence beyond a reasonable doubt to find Thomas guilty.

Jurors deliberated for approximately seven hours spread over two days before returning a verdict. On June 12, 2014, the jury returned a verdict of not guilty. According to Thomas's defense attorney, Thomas was "stunned" by the verdict. Assistant District Attorney Christa Book said after the trial that "I'm sorry that I could not bring Matthew justice." One of the jurors said after the trial: "We were trying to grasp that we could not use stuff that was not allowable but we all agreed in the end he was not guilty based on what we had in front of us." After the verdict was returned, his family members said that he planned to return to Douglas, Georgia, and for a welcome home party. On June 15, 2014, he reunited with his family in Georgia.

== Controversy ==
The controversy over this case revolves around the interrogation technique police used to get a confession out of Thomas. The technique is called the Reid technique. The Reid technique is a nine-step procedure followed by most police agencies in the United States. The technique begins by confronting the suspect with guilt, offering the suspect a reason for why he or she committed the crime, followed by various techniques of applying psychological pressure to get the suspect to confess and ultimately obtaining a written confession.

The New York Court of Appeals ruled in Thomas's case that the extent to which police lied and used coercion during an interrogation went too far, but their ruling did not lay out criteria for how much coercion is too much. According to a CBS Channel 6 report, this will lead police agencies across the state of New York to revise their interrogation protocols. Grover Babcock, in an interview with NPR, argued coercive interrogations elicit too many false confessions. He stated that the Innocence Project has exonerated many people through DNA testing and that of those exonerated, about 25% to 30% had given false confessions.

== See also ==
- List of exonerated death row inmates
- List of wrongful convictions in the United States
