= Jumping off a building =

Jumping off a building may refer to:

- BASE jumping, a recreational sport which uses parachutes for safe landing
- A means of committing suicide by jumping from height
