= Aida Bueno Sarduy =

Afro-Cuban anthropologist and documentary filmmaker

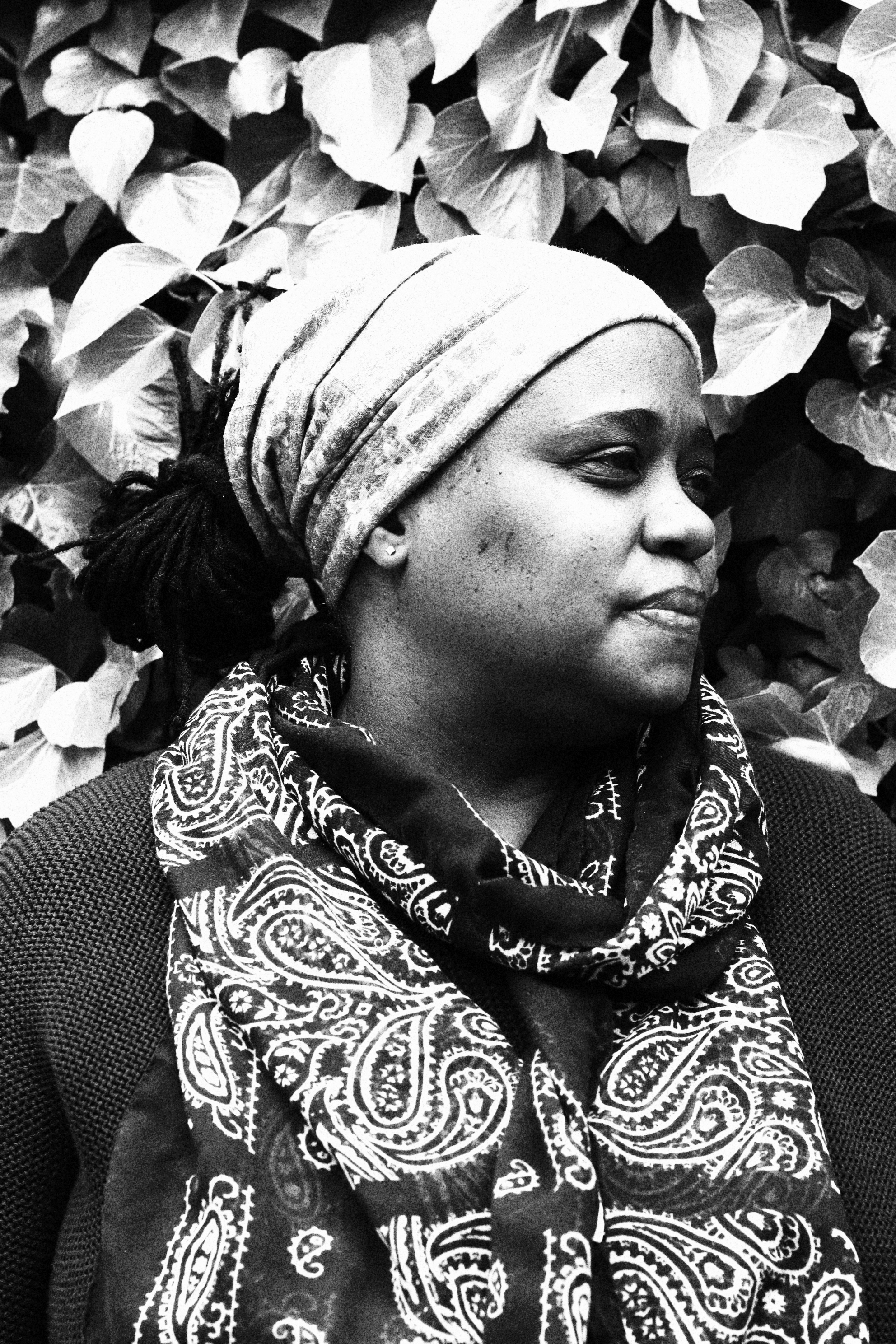
Aída Esther Bueno Sarduy

Aida Esther Bueno Sarduy is an Afro-Cuban anthropologist, documentary filmmaker and professor at New York University.

== Career ==
Sarduy has a PhD in social anthropology from the Complutense University of Madrid. Her PhD thesis examined women's leadership in Afro-descendant religions like the Xangô religion in Recife. From 1999 to 2009 she was a researcher at the Center for Studies on Migration and Racism at Complutense University. She has continued to study the history of black women in South America, and taught at NYU, Hamilton College and Stanford.

Sarduy's short documentary Guillermina (2019) had its world premiere at the New Orleans Film Festival. In March 2020 the Guatemalan Women's Association invited Sarduy to Madrid to talk about Guillermina.

In October 2020 Sarduy spoke on race at NYU's Madrid campus. Arguing that race had been weaponised ever since it was socially constructed, she contrasted two options to deal with that history: negotiating a racial identity, accepting the existence and significance of race, or refusing entirely to accept race-based standards. Distinguishing different forms of racism (racism by conviction, programmatic racism, emotional racism and customary racism), she called for widespread re-education in Spain.

== Films ==
- Guillermina. Cuba, 2019. 17 minutes.
