= Murder of Stephanie Crowe =

1998 child murder in Escondido, California

The murder of Stephanie Crowe, a 12-year-old girl, took place in her bedroom inside her home at Escondido, California, sometime between late night January 20, 1998, to early morning January 21, 1998. Stephanie's parents and grandmother found her body on the floor of her bedroom on the morning of January 21, 1998. She had been stabbed eight times. There was no sign of forced entry. Stephanie's window was found unlocked, but a screen was in place and there was no disturbance of accumulated grime and insect traces. A sliding glass door in her parents' bedroom was also unlocked. No knives were found at the scene that seemed consistent with the murder weapon, and no bloody clothing was found despite an exhaustive search.

Stephanie's 14-year-old brother, Michael Crowe, was interrogated for hours by police using the Reid method without his parents’ knowledge and without legal representation. Michael denied any involvement hundreds of times during the interrogation but eventually confessed in what is regarded as a classic example of a false confession. Two of Michael's friends were also interrogated, confessed and charged with Stephanie's murder.

The interrogations were conducted in such an egregious manner, combined with other evidence that pointed to a transient schizophrenic who lived in the area, that the boys were eventually declared to be factually innocent by a judge. The transient who was seen in the neighborhood on the night of her murder was eventually convicted of manslaughter, although the conviction was subsequently overturned. A November 2013 retrial acquitted him of all charges.

== Investigation ==
All of the Crowe family members were questioned, their clothing was confiscated, and their bodies were examined for injuries. The parents were then put up in a motel, while the two surviving children were taken to the county's shelter for children, and were not allowed to see their parents for two days. During that time, police interviewed both children, unbeknownst to their parents. They took Michael Crowe, Stephanie's 14-year-old brother, away to the police station for questioning on several occasions.

Michael Crowe became the police's main suspect for the murder. He was singled out by Escondido police because the crime scene seemed to suggest an inside job, and because he seemed "distant and preoccupied" after Stephanie's body was discovered and the rest of the family grieved. Police interrogated him multiple times without his parents' knowledge and without an attorney present. During the interrogations, police falsely informed him that they had found physical evidence implicating him, that he had failed an examination with a so-called "truth verification" device, and that his parents were convinced he had done it. After an intense 6-hour interrogation, he gave a vague confession to killing his sister, providing no details and saying that he couldn't remember doing it. The interview was videotaped by police; at times Michael is heard saying things to the effect of, "I'm only saying this because it's what you want to hear." He was arrested and charged with murdering his sister.

Police from Escondido and nearby Oceanside also questioned Joshua Treadway and Aaron Houser, two 15-year-old friends of Michael Crowe. Houser had a collection of knives; one of them was reported missing by Houser's parents. It turned up at Treadway's house; he said he had taken it from Houser. Police took Treadway to police headquarters and questioned him continuously for eleven hours from 9 p.m. that day until 8.a.m. the next, telling him that they believed his knife was the murder weapon. They interrogated him again two weeks later, a 10-hour interview during which Treadway gave a detailed confession to participating in the murder with the other two boys. Treadway was then arrested.

Aaron Houser was then arrested and questioned. He did not actually confess and steadfastly denied any involvement, but he did present a "hypothetical" account of how the crime might have happened, under prompting by police interrogators using the Reid technique. All three boys subsequently recanted their statements claiming coercion. The majority of Michael Crowe's confession was later ruled as coerced by a judge because Escondido investigators implied to Michael that they would talk to the district attorney and recommend leniency. Treadway actually confessed twice, the first to Oceanside detectives and a second, identical confession, to Escondido officers. The court ruled that the two confessions were redundant and ordered that the first be suppressed. The second Treadway confession remains admissible. Houser's statements to police were suppressed because police did not sufficiently advise him of his Miranda rights.

On the day the body was discovered, the police also interviewed Richard Raymond Tuite, a 28-year-old transient who had been seen in the Crowe's neighborhood on the night of the murder, knocking on doors and looking in windows, causing several neighbors to call police reporting a suspicious person. Tuite had a lengthy criminal record, habitually wandered the streets of Escondido, and had been diagnosed as schizophrenic. Police questioned Tuite, confiscated his clothing, and noticed scrapes on his body and a cut on his hand. However, they did not consider him a suspect, since they considered him incapable of murder and they had already focused on Michael Crowe as their prime suspect.

== Legal proceedings ==
The three teenage boys were charged with murder and conspiracy to commit murder. A judge ruled that they should be tried as adults. They were incarcerated for six months as prosecutors prepared to try them. However, as Treadway's trial was about to begin in January 1999, belated DNA testing found three drops of Stephanie's blood on a shirt belonging to Tuite. Based on the new evidence, the charges against the boys were dismissed without prejudice (which would allow charges to be reinstated against the boys at a later date).

Embarrassed by the reversal, the Escondido police and the San Diego County District Attorney let the case languish without charges for two years. In 2001, the District Attorney and San Diego County Sheriff's Department asked that the case be taken over by the California Department of Justice. In May 2002 the Attorney General charged Tuite with murdering Stephanie. The trial began in February 2004. On the first day of jury selection, Tuite walked away from the courtroom holding-tank during the lunch hour after freeing himself from handcuffs; he left the courthouse and boarded a bus. He was caught hours later. At trial, the prosecution linked Tuite to Stephanie's killing by presenting both circumstantial and physical evidence, including evidence that Stephanie's blood was on his clothes. Tuite's defense team argued that the boys had killed Stephanie, and that Stephanie's blood was found on Tuite's clothes as a result of contamination caused by careless police work. On May 26, 2004, the jury acquitted Tuite of murder but convicted him of the lesser included offense of voluntary manslaughter. The jury also found that he used a deadly weapon, a knife. The trial court sentenced Tuite to thirteen years in prison. He subsequently had four more years added onto the sentence due to his flight attempt.

The families of all three boys sued the cities of Escondido and Oceanside. The Crowes reached a settlement of $7.25 million in 2011. In 2012, Superior Court Judge Kenneth So made the rare ruling that Michael Crowe, Treadway and Houser were factually innocent of the charges, permanently dismissing the criminal case against them.

Tuite appealed his conviction to the California Court of Appeal and raised several claims, including a claim that his Sixth Amendment rights were violated because he was precluded from fully cross-examining a prosecution witness. On December 14, 2006, the Court of Appeal affirmed in a lengthy unpublished opinion. The court found that the trial judge had committed constitutional error in limiting the cross-examination, but held the error to be harmless and affirmed the conviction. The Supreme Court of California denied review. The federal district court denied Tuite's petition for habeas corpus. On September 8, 2011, a panel of the U.S. Court of Appeals for the Ninth Circuit voted 2–1 to overturn Tuite's manslaughter conviction, ruling the trial was unfair because the trial judge limited cross-examination of a prosecution witness. The panel stated in its opinion, "Given the lack of evidence tying Tuite to the crime, the problems with the DNA evidence, the jury's deadlock and compromise verdict, and the weight and strategic position of McCrary's testimony, this case is one of those 'unusual' circumstances in which we find ourselves 'in virtual equipoise as to the harmlessness of the error.' O'Neil v. McAninch, 513 U.S. 432, 435 (1995). We must treat the error as affecting the verdict, and we are compelled to grant the writ." Tuite v. Martel, No. 09-56267. It was noted that during the trial the prosecution could not produce any trace evidence of the house on the defendant's clothing or person nor was any trace evidence of the defendant's person or clothing found in the house, facts that the Court of Appeals cited which led to the Court's determination of lack of evidence.

Tuite was granted a retrial, which began on October 24, 2013. In closing arguments, his attorney, Brad Patton, told jurors that Tuite had never been in the Crowe house, and wouldn't have been able to find Stephanie's bedroom in the dark home. In addition, investigators did not find his fingerprints or DNA in the residence. Patton said Stephanie must have been held down under a comforter to keep her quiet, while someone else stabbed her. He also said that experts testified that the blood stains on Tuite's shirts were not there when those shirts were originally evaluated, and got there through contamination during the crime scene analysis. The prosecutor, Deputy Attorney General Alana Butler, said during her closing argument that Tuite was in the area of the Crowe home the night Stephanie was killed. He was knocking on doors and looking for a woman named Tracy, at whom he was angry because she had turned him away a couple of years earlier. He was "obsessed and delusional". Butler said Tuite wandered into the Crowe home at about 10 p.m. through an open door. Once he got in the house, she couldn't tell exactly what happened, but he went into Stephanie's bedroom and stabbed her at least nine times, and her blood was found on two shirts that he was wearing when contacted by police the next day.

On December 5, 2013, the jury returned a verdict of not guilty. Afterwards, a juror said there was no evidence that Tuite was ever in the Crowe residence that night, and that the jurors were concerned that the victim's blood might have got onto his shirts through contamination, so they looked hard at that possibility.

== Impact ==
- The attempted prosecution of the three boys was partially responsible for San Diego County District Attorney Paul Pfingst's loss to Bonnie Dumanis in the 2002 election.
- A TV movie called The Interrogation of Michael Crowe was made about the case in 2002. And that dramatization was based on the original, factual documentary created for and aired on Court TV in 2001 by co-writer/producer/directors Marc Wallace and Jonathan Greene. Their documentary, with same title, was awarded the Alfred I. duPont–Columbia University Award Silver Baton for excellence in broadcast journalism in January 2002.
- The 2003 book Who Killed Stephanie Crowe?, written by Paul E. Tracy, a criminology professor at the University of Texas at Dallas, in collaboration with two of the original detectives, raised questions about Tuite's guilt.
- The 2006 book Shattered Justice: A Savage Murder and the Death of Three Families' Innocence by John Philpin focuses on the impact of the crime and the criminal charges on the three boys and their families.

== See also ==
- List of unsolved murders (1980–1999)
- List of wrongful convictions in the United States
