= Autokabalesis =

Act of jumping from a high place

In psychiatry, autokabalesis refers to voluntary, deliberate acts of jumping or falling from a significant height to the ground. Autokabalesis can be caused by a psychiatric disorder, or can be a method of suicide. The latter case is referred to as suicide by jumping from height.

== Studies ==
Autokabalesis was studied in 1979 by Sims & O'Brien K. A 1992 study found that many suicidal acts of autokabalesis were committed by young males who were unemployed and single. A 1988 study of 28 persons hospitalized as a result of autokabalesis showed most fallers had serious psychiatric disorders.

Examination of data from between 1990 and 1998 of suicide by autokabalesis within New York City showed the highest number of deaths were among those aged 65 and over (Abrams et al 2005).

== Prevalence ==
Between 1987 and 1990, 39 people were treated at the University Hospital Bochum in Bochum, Germany with injuries sustained by autokabalesis.

A 1998 study (Joyce & Fleminger) reported that according to the British Office of Population Censuses and Surveys from 1990 to 1994, 4% of all deaths by suicide were accountable by autokabalesis or from jumping in front of moving objects.

== See also ==
- Icarus Project
- Suicide bridge
- Suicide by jumping from height
- Suicidal ideation
