= Full Frame Documentary Film Festival =

Film festival

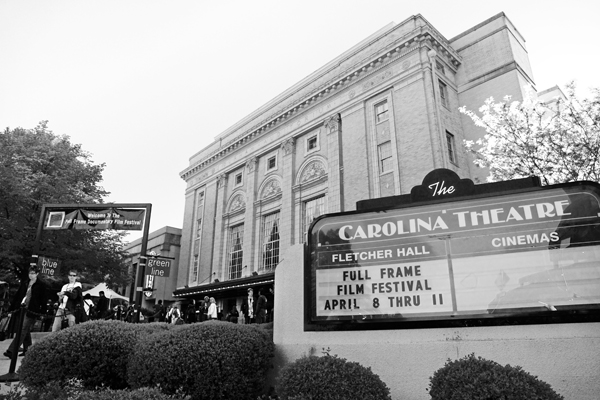
The Carolina Theatre in Durham, NC is the main venue for the festival.

The Full Frame Documentary Film Festival is an annual international event dedicated to the theatrical exhibition of non-fiction cinema founded by Nancy Buirski, a Pulitzer Prize-winning photo editor of The New York Times and documentary filmmaker.

The festival is a program of the Center for Documentary Studies, a non-profit at Duke University. This event receives financial support from corporate sponsors, private foundations, and individual donors. The Presenting Sponsor of the Festival is Duke University. Additional sponsors include: A&E IndieFilms, Academy of Motion Pictures Arts & Sciences, National Endowment for the Arts, Merge Records, Whole Foods, Hospitality Group (parent company for Saladelia Cafe and Madhatter Bakeshop and Cafe), and the City of Durham.

The festival began in 1998 with a few hundred patrons and has grown significantly since then. Full Frame is now considered to be one of the premier documentary film festivals in the United States. Full Frame became a qualifying festival for the Producers Guild of America (PGA) Award for Best Documentary in 2012, and a qualifying festival for the Academy Award for Best Documentary (Short Subject) in 2013.

Full Frame also presents documentary work in other venues both locally and nationally, partnering with organizations like the American Tobacco Historic District/Capitol Broadcasting Company, Des Moines Art Center, Duke University, the IFC Center, the International Affairs Council of North Carolina, the Nasher Museum of Art at Duke University, the National Association of Latino Independent Producers, PNC Financial Services, Rooftop Films, and the University of North Carolina (UNC) School System.

Attendees have included Michael Moore, D. A. Pennebaker, Martin Scorsese, Danny DeVito, Ken Burns, Joan Allen, Al Franken, and Steve James.

== Curated series ==
Each year the festival invites a member of the documentary filmmaking community to curate a series of films on a specific topic. The curated series have included:

- 1998: Tolerance, curator Larry Kardish
- 1999: 'World Without Limits
- 2000: Outside Looking In: Coming of Age Stories, curator Alan Berliner
- 2001: 2001 - Fast Forward', curator Kent Jones, Film Society of Lincoln Center
- 2002: Score!, curator DA Pennebaker
- 2003: Leadership Through a Gender Lens, curators Marie Wilson and Chris Hegedus
- 2004: Hybrid: A New Film Form, curator Mary Lea Bandy
- 2005: Why War?, curator Cara Mertes
- 2006: Class in America, curator St. Clair Bourne
- 2007: The Power of 10, curators St. Clair Bourne, Charles Burnett, Ariel Dorfman, Cara Mertes, Michael Moore, Walter Mosley, Mira Nair, DA Pennebaker, Julia Reichert, and Martin Scorsese
- 2009: Migrations, curator Lourdes Portillo
- 2009: This Sporting Life, curator Steve James
- 2010: Work and Labor, curators Steve Bognar and Julia Reichert
- 2011: One Foot in the Archives, curator Rick Prelinger
- 2012: Family Affairs, curator Ross McElwee
- 2013: Stories About Stories, curator Amir Bar-Lev
- 2014: Approaches to Character, curator Lucy Walker
- 2015: The Moral Compass, curator Jennifer Baichwal
- 2016: Perfect and Otherwise: Documenting American Politics, curator R. J. Cutler
- 2017: DoubleTake, curator Sadie Tillery
- 2018: Crime and Punishment, curator Joe Berlinger

== Tribute awards ==
From 1998 to 2011, the festival presented a filmmaker with the Full Frame Career Award. In 2012, this award was changed to the Full Frame Tribute. Past recipients include:

- 1998: Albert Maysles, Michael Apted
- 2000: D. A. Pennebaker, Chris Hegedus
- 2001: Barbara Kopple
- 2003: Charles Guggenheim
- 2004: Marcel Ophüls
- 2005: Ken Burns, Ric Burns
- 2006: Richard Leacock
- 2007: Ross McElwee
- 2008: William Greaves
- 2009: St. Clair Bourne
- 2010: Liz Garbus and Rory Kennedy
- 2011: Ricki Stern and Annie Sundberg
- 2012: Stanley Nelson
- 2013: Jessica Yu
- 2014: Steve James
- 2015: Marshall Curry
- 2016: Kirsten Johnson
- 2018: Jehane Noujaim

== Industry award ==
Occasionally, the festival honors an industry member who has made important contributions to the field with the Full Frame Industry Award. Past recipients include:

- 2000: Sheila Nevins
- 2001: Soros Documentary Fund/Diane Weyermann
- 2003: Pat Mitchell
- 2007: P.O.V./Marc Weiss

== Awards ==
The festival offers a number of prizes at each event.

The prizes awarded at the 2016 festival were:

- The Reva and David Logan Grand Jury Award for the best feature film.
- The Full Frame Jury Award for Best Short for the best film of 40 minutes or less.
- The Full Frame Audience Award for a short film and a feature film chosen by ballot of the attendees of the festival.
- The Center for Documentary Studies (CDS) Filmmaker Award for the film that best combines originality and creativity with firsthand experience in examining central issues of contemporary life and culture.
- The Charles E. Guggenheim Emerging Artist Award for the best first-time documentary feature filmmaker.
- The Full Frame President's Award for the best student film.
- The Kathleen Bryan Edwards Award for Human Rights for a film that addresses a significant human rights issue in the United States.

Past Kathleen Bryan Edwards Award for Human Rights are:

- 2020: Us Kids, Directed by Kim A. Snyder
- 2019: Mossville: When Great Trees Fall, Directed by Alexander Glustrom

Past Grand Jury Award winners are:

- 1998: In Harm's Way, Travis
- 1999: Return with Honor, Fotoamator
- 2000: La Bonne du Conduite: 5 Histoires d' Auto Ecole (The Way I Look at You: 5 Stories of Driving School')
- 2001: Benjamin Smoke, Avant de Partir
- 2002: The First Year
- 2003: Etre et Avoir
- 2004: Control Room
- 2005: Murderball, Shape of the Moon
- 2006: Iraq in Fragments
- 2007: The Monastery
- 2008: Trouble the Water
- 2009: Burma VJ
- 2010: Enemies of the People
- 2011: Scenes of a Crime
- 2012: Special Flight (Vol Special)
- 2013: American Promise
- 2014: Evolution of a Criminal
- 2015: (T)error, Kings of Nowhere
- 2016: Starless Dreams
- 2017: QUEST
- 2018: Hale County This Morning, This Evening (special jury award Of Fathers and Sons)
- 2019: One Child Nation
- 2020: Mayor
- 2021: Faya Dayi
- 2022: I Didn't See You There
- 2023: (Festival not Held)
- 2024: Hollywoodgate
- 2025: Seeds
- 2026: A Fox Under a Pink Moon
