= Fred E. Inbau =

American lawyer (1909–1998)

Fred E. Inbau (1909 – 1998) was an American lawyer and criminologist who helped develop the Reid technique of interrogation. He was director of the Scientific Crime Detection Lab. He coauthored the influential textbook Criminal Interrogations and Confessions.

Inbau was from New Orleans. After a law degree from Tulane University, he moved to Chicago. He studied at the Northwestern University School of Law and, after a few years as a trial lawyer, become a teacher there for 32 years. He was president of the American Academy of Forensic Sciences. He founded Americans for Effective Law Enforcement.
