= Alexander Glustrom =

Alexander Glustrom is an American film director and cinematographer. He has directed award winning films and shot projects for HBO, CNN, New York Times, A&E, Vice, Great Big Story, and Democracy Now. He currently works as a cinematographer on commercials, films and tv shows.

== Early life and education ==
Glustrom was born in Midtown Atlanta. His grandparents Marian and John Glustrom were allies in the civil rights movement. He graduated high school from The Paideia School in Atlanta and college from Tulane University in New Orleans. At Tulane, he founded the student organization Tulane University Community Advancement Network (TUCAN) which brought students to The Boys and Girls Club to tutor and learn from the youth participants. After graduating he worked at the Boys & Girls Club located in The Iberville Projects.

== Career ==
Glustrom's feature-length documentary directorial debut Big Charity premiered at the New Orleans Film Festival in 2014 where it won the Audience Award and Jury Prize for Best Louisiana Feature. Mike Scott of NOLA.com declared it as one of the top 5 films made in New Orleans in 2014 and described the film as "a stark, pull-no-punches look at the shameful political maneuvering and blatant opportunism that played out in the wake of Hurricane Katrina."

Glustrom's second feature documentary film Mossville: When Great Trees Fall was released in 2019 and has won more than 15 awards at festivals around the world. The film premiered at the Full Frame Documentary Film Festival where it won The Kathleen Bryan Edwards Award for Human Rights. It also won Documentary of the Year from Louisiana Endowment for the Humanities and the David Carr Award for Truth in Non-Fiction Filmmaking Award from Montclair Film Festival. Reviewing it for The New York Times, Glenn Kenny wrote: "The film tells the story of a centuries-old black community in Louisiana laid waste by a chemical company, and of the residents who refuse to leave." In The Hollywood Reporter, Frank Scheck described the film as "a powerful portrait of the human cost of environmental devastation."

== Awards ==
=== Personal awards ===
- Filmmaker of the Year at the 2015 New Orleans Millennial Awards
- Gambit Magazine 40 Under 40 2014 Edition

=== Big Charity: The Death of Americas Oldest Hospital ===
- Jury Award and Audience Award for Louisiana Feature at New Orleans Film Festival
- Documentary of the Year from Louisiana Endowment for the Humanities

=== Mossville: When Great Trees Fall ===
- The Kathleen Bryan Edwards Award for Human Rights at Full Frame Documentary Film Festival
- David Carr Truth in Non-Fiction Filmmaking Award and Junior Jury Award from Montclair Film Festival.
- Best Documentary Film from Rainier Independent Film Festival
- Best Documentary Film and EcoHero Award from Portland EcoFilm Festival.
- Best International Feature from Toronto’s Planet In Focus.
- Best In Show from Bend Film Festival.
- Best Southern Feature from Hot Springs Documentary Film Festival
- Audience Award and Honorable Jury Mention from New Orleans Film Festival.
- Documentary of the Year from Louisiana Endowment for the Humanities.
- Best Feature Film from EFFY Film Festival
- Impact Award from EarthxFilm Festival
- Environmental Grit Award from Indie Grits Film Festival
- Documentary Journalism Award from Salem Film Festival
- Moving Mountains Award from MountainFilm Festival
