= Fingers in the Wind =

2022 film directed by Chad Murdock

- Theatrical Poster
- Directed by: Chad Murdock
- Written by: Chad Murdock
- Produced by: Chad Murdock
- Starring: Taylor Brianna; Azendé Kendale Johnson; Maya Holliday; Torri Grice
- Cinematography: Maisie Gibb; Brad Nelson
- Edited by: Chad Murdock
- Music by: Beuys Dorminivil
- Release date: November 5, 2022 (New Orleans Film Festival)
- Running time: 100 minutes
- Country: United States
- Language: English

Fingers in the Wind is a 2022 drama film directed by Chad Murdock. The film explores the mind of a young woman inhibited by an unclear memory from her childhood. Fingers in the Wind had its international premiere at the 2022 New Orleans Film Festival.

== Plot ==
A nameless young man (Azendé Kendale Johnson), purchases flowers and shows up at the apartment building of his love interest, Naya (Maya Holliday), but when he rings the bell she is too busy breaking up with her best friend, Faye Wood (Taylor Brianna), to answer. The young man gives up and leaves with the flowers, while the conversation with Naya causes Faye to flee the apartment as well. The two of them wind up in the same place at the park, meeting each other for the first time, when Faye mistakes the young man for a complicated figure from her childhood. They spend a romantic afternoon together, but it soon unravels after a strange encounter with Naya, forcing Faye to face the true nature of her relationship with Naya, as well as the person she mistakes the young man for. The next morning, Faye flies to her hometown, but soon realizes she is the stranger in town, unrecognizable to everyone, including Nelly, the boy, and her mother.

== Cast ==
- Taylor Brianna – Faye Wood
- Azendé Kendale Johnson – Young Man
- Maya Holliday – Naya
- Torri Grice – Ms. Barnes

== Release ==
The film premiered at the 2022 New Orleans Film Festival.

== Critical reception ==
Fingers in the Wind received positive critical reception. It holds a 100% "Fresh" rating on Rotten Tomatoes based on five reviews. Reviewing for Film Threat, Jason Delgado stated that "the cast and Chad Murdoch’s originality in both techniques and narrative made it a worthwhile journey." In a review for The Independent Critic, Richard Propes wrote, "Fingers in the Wind will prove to be a unique and rewarding experience."
