= PEACE method of interrogation =

Investigative interviewing procedure

The PEACE method of investigative interviewing is a five-stage process in which investigators try to build rapport and allow a criminal suspect to provide their account of events uninterrupted, before presenting the suspect with any evidence of inconsistencies or contradictions. It is designed to obtain a full account of events rather than to get a confession. The PEACE method, which "encourages more of a dialogue between investigator and suspect", was developed in the UK in the early 1990s in response to the realisation that psychologically coercive techniques often led to false confessions. It contrasts to the Reid technique used in the US, which has traditionally focused on a confrontational confession-driven interrogation style that leads interrogators to be more aggressive, accusatory, and threatening in terms of proposing consequences for a suspect's failure to confess to the crime. Critics of the Reid method have argued that accusatory methodology can increase the likelihood of a false confession, leading to a broader shift of interviewing with the PEACE method.

Similarly, shifts away from confrontational interrogation methods can also be seen in other interviewing approaches, such as the Wicklander–Zulawski method, a US based ethical non-confrontational approach, which includes building a rapport with clients/suspects and conversationally driven interviewing questions. This method aims to reduce resistance and push for cooperation from the interviewee.

In 2015, the Royal Canadian Mounted Police adopted a new standard influenced by the PEACE model. Sergeant Darren Carr, who trains police with the new approach, described it as "less Kojak and more Dr. Phil". There is some resistance to adopting the PEACE model in Canada. The PEACE approach avoids the use of deceptive information to overwhelm suspects, and it emphasizes information gathering over eliciting confessions and discourages investigators from presuming a suspect's guilt.

== Stages ==
=== Planning and preparation ===
Without proper planning and preparation, many interviews fail before they even begin. Here, planning is "the mental process of getting ready to interview" and preparation is "considering what needs to be made ready prior to interview". This stage involves goals such as: understanding the purpose of the interview; obtaining as much background information as possible on the incident under investigation; defining the aims and objectives of the interview; assessing what evidence is available and from where it was obtained; assessing what evidence is needed and how it can be obtained.

=== Engage and explain ===
The purpose of this stage is to establish rapport and is described in the literature as the most influential aspect in whether or not an interview is successful. It involves showing concern for the subject's welfare by asking how they want to be addressed, how much time they've got available to be interviewed and giving reassurance if the person seems anxious or nervous.

=== Account — Clarification and challenge ===
This stage is where the interviewer attempts to obtain a full account of events from the subject without interrupting. Once the subject has explained what happened, the interviewer can ask follow up questions which allow them to expand and clarify their account of events. If necessary this may involve challenging aspects of the interviewee's story if contradictory information is available.

=== Closure ===
This stage involves summarizing the subject's account of what happened and is designed to ensure there is mutual understanding between interviewer and interviewee about what has taken place. It also involves verifying that everything that needs to be discussed has been covered.

=== Evaluation ===
This stage requires the interviewer to examine whether they achieved what they wanted from the interview; to review the status of the investigation in the light of any new information that was received; and to reflect upon how well the interview went and what, if anything, could have been done differently.

== Effectiveness ==
How well the PEACE method works appears to depend primarily on how well trained the interviewers are. In a study published in the British Psychological Society related to benefit fraud, 63% of (non-police) interviewers who displayed an acceptable level of competence in their interviewing ability obtained comprehensive accounts or full confessions from subjects. Even when subjects denied any offending, these interviewers still obtained a comprehensive account of what happened. This reaffirmed the importance of eliciting and fully testing the suspects’ accounts of events. In the same study, 92% of interviewers who did not display competence in their interviewing technique failed to obtain a comprehensive account of events or a confession from their subjects.

However, skill and training are not the only factors at play. Half the suspects in this study confessed even though the interviewers' skills were considered less than satisfactory. This suggests that "some suspects enter the interview room having decided to confess and will carry out this decision irrespective of the investigator’s performance".

In addition to investigations into benefit fraud, several studies have noted that training the police in the PEACE model has also produced beneficial results.

== International adoption ==
As of November 2017, the PEACE method has been adopted by police forces in Australia, New Zealand, Norway, and parts of Canada. Vietnam and Indonesia are also considering using this approach.
