= Montclair Film =

Nonprofit organization well known for organizing the annual Montclair Film Festival

Montclair Film Festival

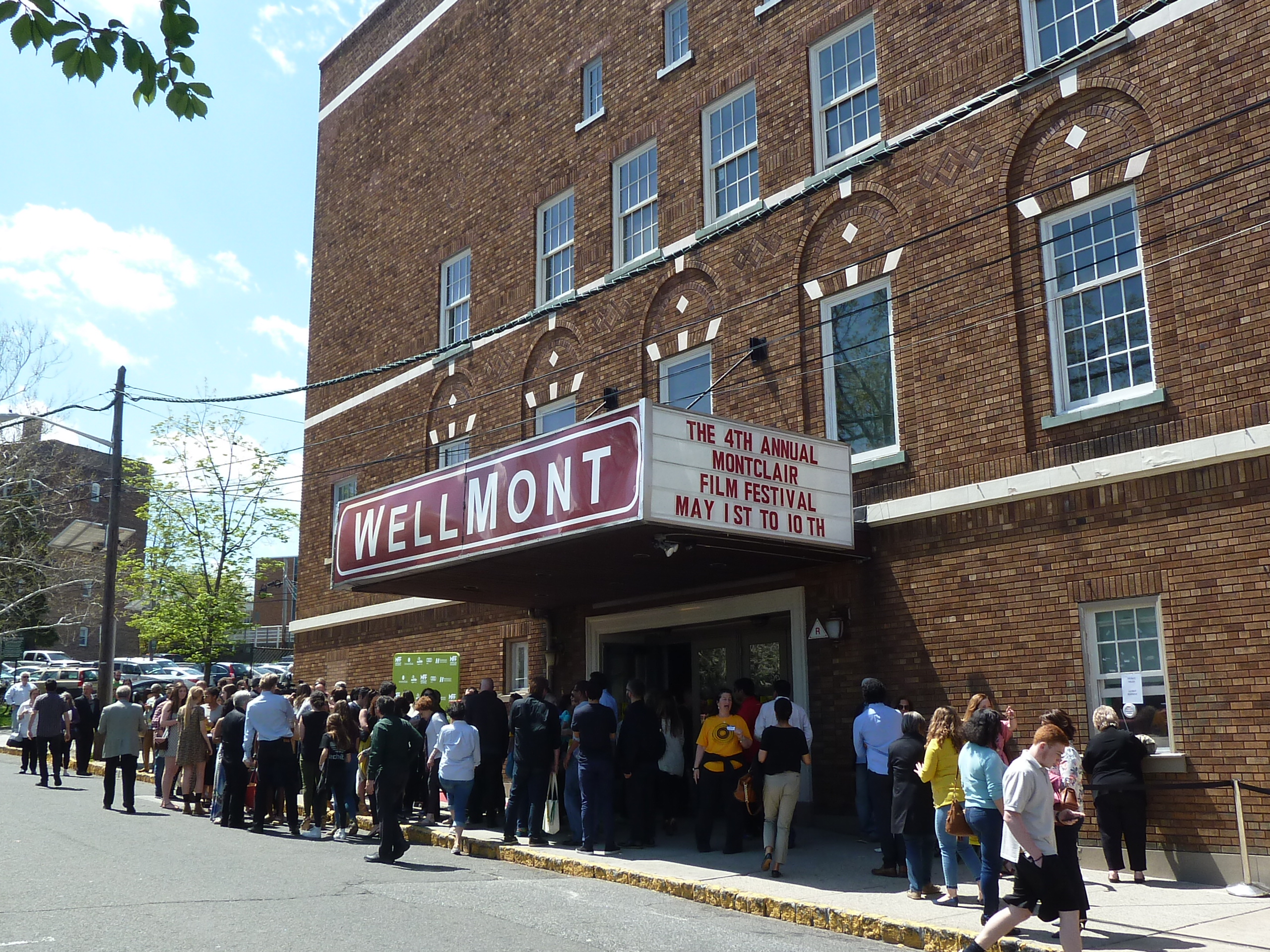
- Wellmont Theatre during the MFF15
- Location: Montclair, New Jersey, U.S.
- Founded: 2012
- Most recent: 2025
- Festival date: October 17 to October 26, 2025
- Language: International
- Website: montclairfilm.org

Montclair Film is a nonprofit that organizes the Montclair Film Festival (MFF). The annual festival is held between mid- to late- October in Montclair, New Jersey, and showcases new works from American and international filmmakers. Films are programmed based on categories including: Fiction, Non-Fiction, World Cinema, Short, and Student Filmmaking.

Notable advisory board members include J.J. Abrams, Jonathan Alter, Stephen Colbert, Abigail Disney, Olympia Dukakis, Chiwetel Ejiofor, Emma Freud, Laura Linney, Jon Stewart, Julie Taymor, and Patrick Wilson.

== History ==
The film festival was founded by WNET-TV Vice President and General Counsel Bob Feinberg. Feinberg hired festival programmer Thom Powers and director Raphaela Neihausen, and developed the Board of Directors composed of Montclair residents. The board includes film and media professionals, philanthropists and community leaders.

== Editions ==
=== MFF 2012: Inaugural festival ===
The festival's inaugural event attracted 5,000 - 7,500 attendees and programmed over 45 films. Notable attendees included Oliver Platt, Kathleen Turner, Olympia Dukakis, Patrick Wilson, Michael Moore and author Judy Blume. Film featured included The Oranges, Your Sister’s Sister, 2 Days in New York and Robot and Frank. The MFF won the award for Favorite Film Festival at the 2012 Discover Jersey Arts People's Choice Awards.

=== MFF 2013 ===
The second festival was held across several venues in Montclair and attracted more than 14,000 attendees. It programmed over 80 films and events. A favorite film category was established in an effort to provide a platform for established and lesser-known filmmakers from New Jersey. Prominent guests included Michael Moore, Harry Belafonte, Darlene Love, Lake Bell, Ice-T, Alex Gibney and New York Times culture columnist David Carr.Films screened included 20 Feet From Stardom, The Attack, Blackfish, Frances Ha, The Act of Killing, The Spectacular Now, Dirty Wars, In A World..., The Kings of Summer, Computer Chess, Still Mine, Stories We Tell and Valley of Saints.

Notable guests included Michael Moore, Harry Belafonte, Darlene Love, Lake Bell, Ice-T, Alex Gibney and New York Times culture columnist David Carr.

=== MFF 2014 ===
The third festival featured the film Chef, with Jon Favreau.

=== MFF 2015 ===
The fourth festival's introductory film was Hello, My Name Is Doris with Sally Field. It additionally featured Time Out of Mind with Richard Gere.

=== MFF 2016 ===
The fifth festival opened with Roger Ross Williams' film Life, Animated. Following the film, a panel discussion was held with Advisory Board Member Stephen Colbert, members of the Suskind family, film creators, and Gilbert Gottfried, who appeared in the film. The festival closed with the film Miss Sharon Jones!, documenting the story of Sharon Jones and The Dap-Kings as Jones fought cancer

=== MFF 2020 ===
The ninth festival's opening film was Nomadland. MFF additionally featured One Night in Miami, Ammonite and Derek DelGaudio’s In & Of Itself. Lee Isaac Chung's Minari was selected as the virtual centerpiece film. The festival was postponed and held primarily remotely as a result of the COVID-19 pandemic.

=== MFF 2024 ===
On October 20, 2024, Montclair Film announced the full slate for the 2024 Film Festival, that took place from October 18 to 27, 2024. The festival opened with Conclave, directed by Edward Berger and closed with The Piano Lesson, directed by Malcolm Washington.

=== MMF 2025 ===
The festival opened on October 17, 2025 with Noah Baumbach's movie Jay Kelly. The last day of the festival was October 26 (MMF25 Festival Guide).

=== Year-round programming ===
Montclair Film additionally holds educational programs and events for the public. These events are programmed throughout the year. Past events include: the Free Summer Series Under the Stars; the Kidz Shortz Filmmaking Competition and Workshop for youths; free African American Heritage Month screenings; the Underdog Festival at Montclair State University, featuring screenings of Oscar-nominated shorts; the Behind the Screen: Media Career Day for high school and university students; the Festival Poster Competition; networking events for industry insiders and newcomers; a celebrity fundraiser (with Advisory Board Member Stephen Colbert), and an Oscars’ Eve Party.

=== MMF 2026 ===
The 15th edition of the festival will open on October 16, 2026 with Martin McDonagh's black comedy action thriller film Wild Horse Nine. It will close on October 25, 2026 with Tony Gilroy's musical drama film Behemoth!.

== Winners ==
=== Montclair Film Festival Fiction Feature Award ===
- 2026 – Possible Love, directed by Lee Chang-dong
- 2019 – Monos, directed by Alejandro Landes
- 2018 – First Reformed, directed by Paul Schrader

=== Sinofsky Award for Documentary Feature ===
- 2026 – Rehearsals for a Revolution, directed by Pegah Ahangarani
- 2019 – Honeyland, directed by Ljubomir Stefanov and Tamara Kotevska
- 2018 – Hale County This Morning, This Evening, directed by RaMell Ross

=== The David Carr Award For Truth In Non-Fiction Filmmaking ===
- 2019 – Mossville: When Great Trees Fall, directed by Alexander Glustrom
- 2018 – Dark Money, directed by Kimberly Reed

=== The Mark Urman Award For Fiction Filmmaking ===
- 2026 – One in a Million, directed by Itab Azzam and Jack MacInnes and TheyDream, directed by William D. Caballero (tie)
- 2019 – Mickey and the Bear, directed by Annabelle Attanasio

=== New Jersey Films Award ===
- 2024
  - Zurawski v Texas (Competition)
  - New Jersey Shorts – The Believers
- 2019 – Life with Layla, directed by Ken Spooner and Mike Mee
- 2018 – Crime + Punishment, directed by Stephen Tiang

=== Audible Storyteller Award ===
- 2019 – Mickey and the Bear, directed by Annabelle Attanasio

=== Junior Jury Award ===
- 2024 - Bird, directed by Andrea Arnold
- 2019 – Mossville: When Great Trees Fall, directed by Alexander Glustrom
- 2018 – American Animals, directed by Bart Layton

=== Audience Awards ===
2024

- Fiction Feature – The Piano Lesson
- Documentary Feature – Zurawski v Texas
- World Cinema – Young Hearts
- Short Film – Anuja

=== Short Film Jury Awards ===
2024

- Fiction Short Film – Dissolution
- Documentary Short Film – Death by Numbers

== See also ==
- New Jersey Motion Picture and Television Commission
