= Mossville: When Great Trees Fall =

2019 feature-length documentary film

- Directed by: Alexander Glustrom
- Starring: Stacey Ryan
- Distributed by: Collective Eye, Sundance Now
- Release date: 2019
- Country: United States
- Language: English

Mossville: When Great Trees Fall is a 2019 feature-length documentary film directed by Alexander Glustrom.

Mossville: When Great Trees Fall premiered at the Full Frame Documentary Film Festival where it won The Kathleen Bryan Edwards Award for Human Rights. The film played at festivals around the world and won more than one dozen awards. Mossville: When Great Trees Fall was shown to the Office of the United Nations High Commissioner for Human Rights at the 28th session on Environmental Justice, the Climate Crisis and People of African Descent. The film's educational rights were licensed by Collective Eye. It was selected to be in South Arts’ 2020 Southern Circuit Tour of Independent Filmmakers. Its national broadcast premiere was on PBS series Reel South on May 25, and on the world channel May 31 of 2020. It was also picked up by Sundance Now on July 18 of 2022 and is available for streaming on Amazon Prime Video.

== Summary ==
Stacey Ryan was born and raised in Mossville, Louisiana, an historic African-American town near Lake Charles, Louisiana in Calcasieu Parish. After losing both of his parents to cancer, which he believes to be connected to a toxic ethylene dichloride spill that contaminated their drinking water, he refused to be bought out by the South African energy company Sasol as they built a massive ethane cracker industrial plant all around him. The film also follows a family nearby as they accept the buyout offer and move from the land where many generations of their family were born and raised.

== Critical reception ==
Reviewing it for The New York Times, Glenn Kenny writes: "The film tells the story of a centuries-old black community in Louisiana laid waste by a chemical company, and of the residents who refuse to leave."

In The Hollywood Reporter Frank Scheck described the film as "A powerful portrait of the human cost of environmental devastation." He also wrote, " The film presents a powerful portrait of displacement and environmental devastation stemming from corporate interests, but it ultimately leaves the viewer with more questions than answers."

BRWC described the film by saying: “Mossville captures the devastation of the destruction of a community with grace and empathy and has a message that will reverberate across generations.”

== Awards ==
- The Kathleen Bryan Edwards Award for Human Rights at Full Frame Documentary Film Festival
- David Carr Truth in Non-Fiction Filmmaking Award and Junior Jury Award from Montclair Film Festival.
- Best Documentary Film from Rainier Independent Film Festival
- Best Documentary Film and EcoHero Award from Portland EcoFilm Festival.
- Best International Feature from Toronto’s Planet In Focus.
- Best In Show from Bend Film Festival.
- Best Southern Feature from Hot Springs Documentary Film Festival
- Audience Award and Honorable Jury Mention from New Orleans Film Festival.
- Documentary of the Year from Louisiana Endowment for the Humanities.
- Best Feature Film from EFFY Film Festival
- Impact Award from EarthxFilm Festival
- Environmental Grit Award from Indie Grits Film Festival
- Documentary Journalism Award from Salem Film Festival
- Moving Mountains Award from MountainFilm Festival
