= Murder of Mellory Manning =

2008 murder in Christchurch, New Zealand

Mellory Manning
- One of the early photos released of Mellory throughout the investigation
- Born: Ngatai Lynette Manning; 6 February 1981; Nelson, New Zealand
- Died: 18 December 2008 (aged 27); Avonside, Christchurch, New Zealand
- Cause of death: Knife wounds, strangling, beaten with steel rod

Ngatai Lynette Manning (also known as Mellory Manning, sometimes rendered as Mallory Manning), aged 27, was murdered in Christchurch, New Zealand, on 18 December 2008. Manning was a sex worker. She was picked up from Manchester Street and presumably taken to a property in Avonside and brutally killed by stabbing, strangling, and assault with a metal pole. Her body was then dumped in the nearby Avon River in Christchurch and found the next morning by a kayaker. Four years later, in March 2012, 24-year-old Mauha Huatahi Fawcett was arrested and charged with her abduction and murder. Following his arrest, police acknowledged there were more people involved and the investigation would be ongoing.

Fawcett was a gang prospect, and had fetal alcohol syndrome. A few days after the murder, he was arrested for breaching bail but released. Over the next four years, police interviewed him eleven times. They lied to him, told him not to talk to a lawyer and pressured him into making a false confession.

Fawcett was subsequently convicted of Manning's murder, and in 2014, he was sentenced to a minimum of 20 years in prison. His conviction was quashed by the Court of Appeal in 2017, when it was finally determined that he was cognitively impaired due to fetal alcohol syndrome, and was coerced into signing the confession.

Knowing that Fawcett was not guilty, the police eventually issued a reward for information. No one else has ever been charged.

== Manning's background ==
Manning had a difficult upbringing. Her biological father left the family when she and her siblings were young and they grew up with a stepfather, who was described as 'horrible'. At the age of 14, she left school after spending time foster care, and had started using drugs. She began working as a prostitute at 15, and subsequently spent time in prison.

Her elder sister Jasmine, who "ran in similar circles", entered witness protection and lost contact with Manning, then killed herself in July 2008. Manning gave up prostitution and joined a methadone treatment programme to get off opioids, as she feared she would die young like her sister. Manning inquired about going to a polytechnic to study art, she went to live with her mother, and she and her partner planned to have a child. However, Manning's poverty and unemployment made her unable to afford Christmas presents for her family, and she returned to street prostitution for "just one night". In the days or hours before her death, she had taken methadone, benzodiazepines, and cannabis.

== Events on the day ==
On the evening of 18 December 2008 Manning hitchhiked from Riccarton suburb to central Christchurch. A client picked her up at 9:30 pm from her usual spot at the corner of Manchester and Peterborough Streets and dropped her back there. Manning then had another client which lasted until 10:20 pm. The last sighting of her, by another prostitute, was around 10.35pm. Her cell phone data showed she received a text from a client at 10.41pm, who wanted to see her again. Manning replied to him two minutes later in a neutral manner, suggesting she was not in fear of this individual.

The police believed she was kidnapped shortly thereafter, raped and killed, and her body dumped into the Avon River just before 11pm - her watch stopped working at 10.59pm due to water damage. Another prostitute testified that members of the Mongrel Mob gang were standing over prostitutes in central Christchurch that night, demanding $20 from each job, as they "owned the street".

The following morning, 19 December 2008, a woman running along Dallington Tce, noticed someone's legs in the Avon River. She signalled a passing kayaker, who pulled the body to the side. By this time, Manning had been in the river for eight hours. She was still clothed and had her handbag over her shoulder. The police identified her from her fingerprints, and soon learned she had been working as a prostitute the night before.

== Investigation ==
There were numerous people of interest, specifically men who lived in Christchurch and regularly used prostitutes. Over the next four years, the police interviewed more than 900 people. They obtained Manning's client list, receiving a list of 40 people they were eager to speak to. The police took DNA evidence from a carpark where Manning was known to take her clients.

In January 2009 police announced that grass seeds were found on the cardigan Manning was wearing, suggesting a number of places at which the murder could have taken place. In December, 2010 police announced they had narrowed down the location where Manning was murdered to a property on Galbraith Avenue in Avonside, close to where her body had been dumped in the river. A warehouse at the site was a Mongrel Mob hangout at the time and they were known to tax prostitutes.

In September 2011, the police confirmed that semen found on Manning's body did not match that of any of her clients that night, and they were focusing their investigation on gang members as a result of the discovery of her death site. Police investigated a number of other leads, including Manning's partner who had a criminal history; a former partner who had convictions for murder and rape; and another man who had beaten Manning so badly she ended up in hospital.

== The focus on Mauha Fawcett ==
24 year old Mauha Fawcett was a Mongrel Mob gang prospect, and was required to ‘tax’ sex workers $20 for each client in Christchurch's red-light area. He also had a difficult upbringing, using drugs as a child, and racking up dozens of convictions as he prospected for the gang.

Ten days after Manning's body was found, Fawcett drove to Blenheim, where he crashed his car. He was already known to the police who became suspicious when they heard he left town. A few days after the murder, they arrested him for breaching bail. He was interviewed for four hours without a lawyer and denied having anything to do with Manning's death.

=== Police interview tactics ===
In March 2009, two detectives who have name suppression, arrived unannounced at Waikeria Prison, to interview Fawcett who was being held on unrelated charges. They recorded the interview and lied to Fawcett claiming the Mongrel Mob blamed him for Manning's murder and that his life was in danger. As they left, the detectives told Fawcett not to tell anyone about their conversation, including his lawyer.

They came back three months later, pretending they wanted to help him. They told him there was a $50,000 reward and suggested that if Fawcett helped them, he might receive some money. At that point, he began to suggest he knew about Manning's murder and that he had seen the car she was picked up in. Once again, they told him: "Don't tell your f.....g lawyer everything about this, either."

=== The confession ===
On 10 August, he was interviewed by Detective Inspector, Tom Fitzgerald who had been involved in the arrest and prosection of Scott Watson. Fawcett's story changed every time he was interviewed, but eventually said he hit Manning with a pole. He suggested he had to join in with the attack to win his gang patch. (At Fawcett's appeal in 2022, a leading expert in false confessions, Professor Richard Leo of San Francisco University, said that given he had FASD, the “threats and promises” made to Fawcett by the police were, “without question, psychologically coercive”, and raised the risk he would falsely confess.)

=== The retraction ===
Over the next two-and-a-half years, Fitzgerald and other officers interviewed Fawcett another four times. Each time, he denied any role in Manning's murder. In one interview, he named two Mob members as the killers. Both of them had already been ruled out because their DNA didn't match that found in the semen sample. One of them was in prison at the time of the murder. He was unable to describe Manning's injuries, and said she was stripped naked before being raped - but was found with her clothing still on.

Altogether, the police interviewed Fawcet eleven times. He was arrested on 29 March 2012, and charged him with Manning's kidnap and murder. Police said he was not linked to the semen sample found on Manning's body, but that he was living in Christchurch at the time and had links to the Galbraith Avenue property. He was convicted on the basis of the coerced confession he made during numerous intense police interviews.

=== The trial ===
Fawcett's trial began in the High Court on 7 February 2014. Fawcett fired his lawyer, Craig Ruane, and carried out his own defense. Ruane was appointed as an amicus curia to assist him in court. Ruane ignored Fawcett's claims of innocence and told the court the convicted killer took a "relatively minor role in something that grew beyond his control." Fawcett told the court he was innocent and the police had coerced him into making a confession. At this stage, the police, the judge and the jury were entirely unaware that Fawcett had fetal alcohol syndrome disorder.

In March 2014, a jury of six men and six women found Fawcett guilty of murdering Manning.

=== Sentenced to life in prison ===
In May, Fawcett was sentenced to life imprisonment with possibility of parole after 20 years. A person of interest labelled "Male B" has not yet been identified but is likely connected to Fawcett and the murder. The head detective on the case, Inspector Greg Williams said: "It's very clear in evidence of this trial that there were other people involved in this murder and we certainly intend to bring those people to justice." As at 2025, no one else has ever been charged.

=== Diagnosis of FASD ===
In October 2015, defence lawyer, Chris Stevenson, somewhat reluctantly agreed to visit Fawcett in prison. Afterwards, he said "You only needed to spend 15 or 30 seconds with Mauha, and you knew that cognitively there's something going on. It's very clear." in 2016, he asked neuropsychologist, Valerie McGinn, to conduct a cognitive assessment. She diagnosed him with fetal alcohol syndrome disorder (FASD). McGinn concluded that Fawcett "suffered significant memory impairment, and when he couldn't remember, he was prone to making up something". She described Fawcett as a "disabled young man", and said his condition meant he would "fall for every ploy utilised by the police as they interviewed him over prolonged periods on multiple occasions".

Leading up to Fawcett's appeal, Stevenson and Christchurch barrister, Kerry Cook, spent thousands of hours examining the mistakes made in Fawcett's prosecution, and uncovering what led to the miscarriages of justice. At the appeal, Stevenson was able to confirm that as a result of having FASD, Fawcett made a "bewildering array of incomprehensible statements during his police interviews".

=== Conviction overturned by Court of Appeal ===
On 7 August 2017, the Court of Appeal quashed Fawcett's conviction and ordered a retrial. The appeal was upheld on two grounds. Fawcett's amicus curiae lawyer, who had assisted him in his own defence, had put on defences that were inconsistent with Fawcett's blanket denial of involvement. In addition the Court of Appeal heard expert testimony that Fawcett met the criteria to be diagnosed with foetal alcohol spectrum disorder, which had not been put before the High Court. The Court of Appeal ruled that had this evidence been available during his trial, it might have led to his interviews and admissions of guilt being ruled inadmissible or dismissed by the jury.

In September 2021, High Court Justice Rachel Dunningham ruled Fawcett's statements inadmissible as his foetal alcohol spectrum disorder "makes him an unreliable historian even when he is endeavouring to tell the truth". The Crown agreed to drop the murder charge, and on 26 October 2021, Dunningham dismissed the case. The Crown asked for it to be withdrawn under section 146 of the Criminal Procedure Act which would allow them to relay the charge if new evidence came to light. The Court rejected this. The dismissal means Fawcett can only be retried with leave of the Court of Appeal.

== Comparison with other wrongful convictions ==
Fawcett's lawyer, Christopher Stevenson, notes that Fawcett is not the only New Zealander to make a false confession under police pressure. Confessions obtained in the murders of Brett Hall and Lois Tolley were also found to be obtained improperly by police, and so were excluded from being presented in court by the judge.

Stevenson also pointed to the remarkable similarities involved in the wrongful convictions of Mauha Fawcett and Teina Pora; two vulnerable men, both cognitively impaired due to fetal alcohol syndrome "making up fairytales", and confessing to crimes they weren't involved in.

=== Concerns about police conduct ===
His other lawyer, Kerry Cook was "dumbstruck" listening to the recordings of the detectives discussing lying to Fawcett and warning him not to mention their conversations to his lawyer. Cook said: "Having a lawyer is a deep-grained constitutional right – it can't be taken away because of police pressure, or tactics or strategy."

Tim McKinnel, the former detective whose work helped to free Teina Pora, said it was totally unacceptable for police officers to lie to suspects, "and telling a psychologically vulnerable young Māori male not to speak to a lawyer, whatever your intent, is a deeply troubling feature of any case."
