= New Orleans Film Festival =

Annual film festival in New Orleans, USA

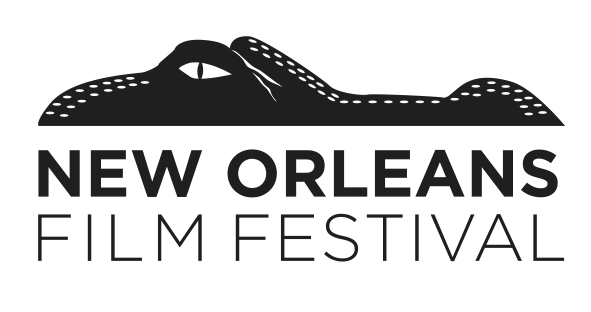
- Location: New Orleans, Louisiana, U.S.
- Founded: 1989
- No. of films: 200+
- Language: International
- Website: neworleansfilmfestival.org

The New Orleans Film Festival is an annual film festival organized by the non-profit organization New Orleans Film Society, a film society founded in 1989. The festival has been held since the society's inception and takes place in October. It has been nicknamed "Cannes on the Mississippi", and features national and international feature films and short films.

The festival had one off-year when New Orleans suffered the effects of Hurricane Katrina in 2005. As of 2018, the festival had grown into an internationally respected annual event that attracts 20–25,000 people, 400+ filmmakers, and 240 films.

It is an Academy Award-qualifying festival in the Narrative Short and Animated Short categories, and it's been recognized by MovieMaker as one of the “Top 50 Film Festivals Worth the Entry Fee” in 2025, and one of the “Top 25 Coolest Film Festivals in the World” in 2024.

Notable screenings include Causeway, Fingers in the Wind, Empire of Light, and Street Punx.

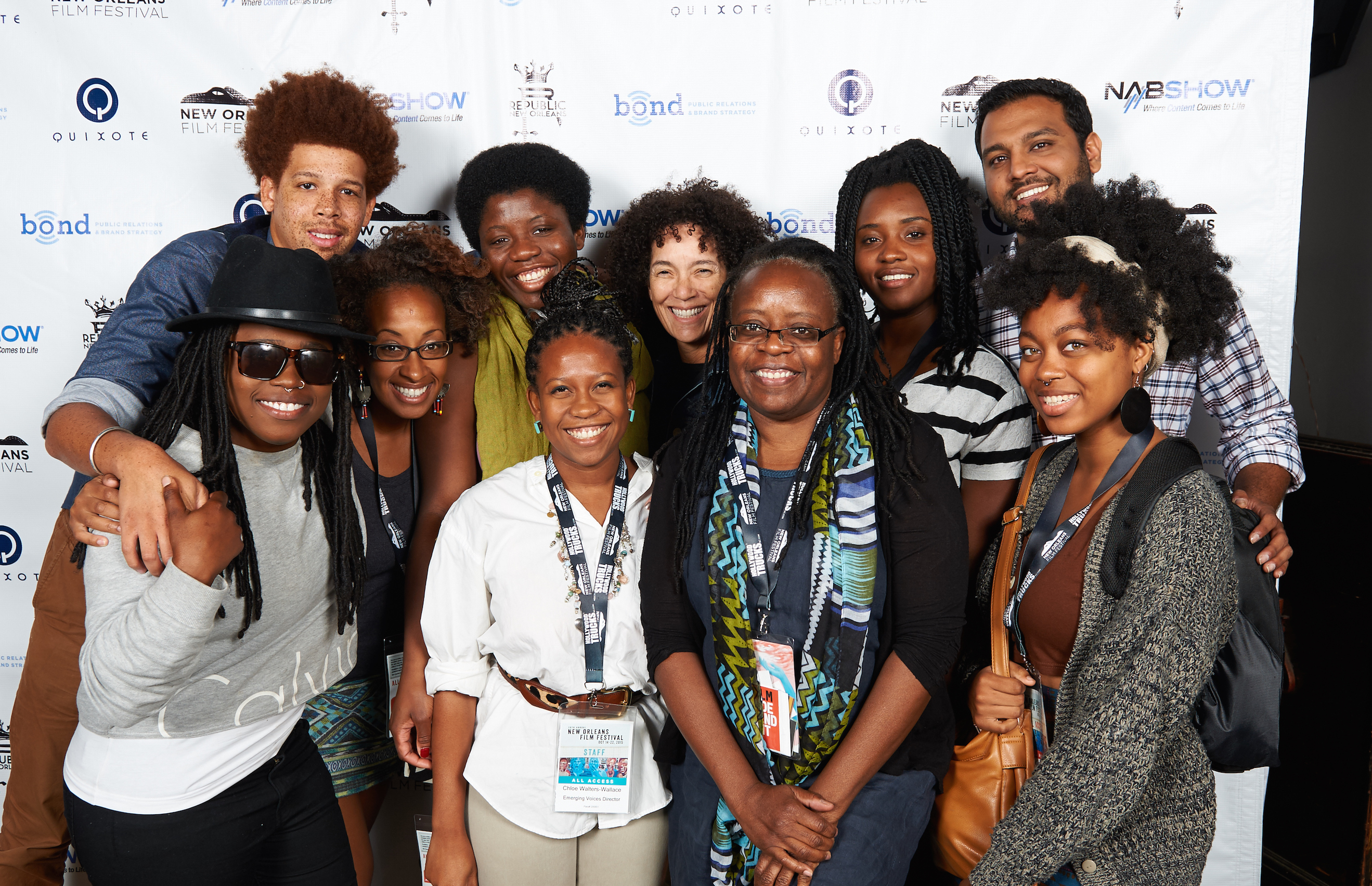
New Orleans Film Festival Emerging Voices Program Cohort 2015

== Diversity and discovery ==
Paste Magazine praised the festival for offering “a platform to voices that still fight to be heard.” We honor three vital commitments to filmmakers and to audiences hungry for fresh work with perspectives less often represented on the silver screen:

- 90% of the 230+ films in the festival will come from submissions, ensuring New Orleans Film Festival is a place of discovery where all voices have an opportunity to be heard
- 50% or more of the films will be helmed by women and gender non-conforming filmmakers
- 45% or more will be helmed by filmmakers of color

=== Emerging Voices Program ===
The Emerging Voices Mentorship program, an initiative of the New Orleans Film Society, was created in 2014 and founded on the principle that to create a more diverse storytelling landscape, filmmakers of color in Louisiana need greater access to gatekeepers.

Applicants include filmmakers with narrative or documentary projects (shorts, features or web-based), experimental films and music videos in the development/pre-production stage. Once selected, during the annual New Orleans Film Festival, selected filmmakers are paired with a Film Industry leader who acts as a mentor through one-on-one meetings. Mentees also participate in short intensive meetings with other industry professionals during the NOFF Industry Exchange to pitch their projects and build further connections.

The program works to empower the local community as well as to promote the unique perspectives and cultures created in Louisiana to the rest of the country, and the world.

== Screenplay competition ==
In an effort to expand its offerings and services to support diverse makers, the New Orleans Film Festival launched its first Screenplay Competition to coincide with the 2018 New Orleans Film Festival. The competition is open to short, episodic and feature-length screenplays. Winners of each category as well as one screenwriter from Louisiana (from any category) receives a cash prize. The winner and top three finalists in all categories receive an All-Access Pass to attend the New Orleans Film Festival. The writers are invited to all panels, roundtables, receptions, networking events, and screenings over the course of the nine-day event.

== Awards ==
=== Narrative Features Competition ===
2020 – Inspector Ike (dir. Graham Mason)

2019 – Test Pattern (dir. Shatara Michelle Ford)

2018 – Chained for Life (dir. by Aaron Schimberg)

2017 – Victor’s History (dir. Nicolas Chevaillier)

2016 –The Other Kids (dir. Chris Brown)

2015 – Embers (dir. Claire Carré)

2014 – Proud Citizen (dir. by Thom Southerland)

=== Documentary Features Competition ===
2020 – Two Gods (dir. Zeshawn Ali)

2019 – Pier Kids (dir. Elegance Bratton)

2018 – For the Birds (dir. Richard Miron)

2017 – Ask the Sexpert (dir. Vaishali Sinha)

2016 – Jackson (dir. Maisie Crow)

2015 – Hotel Nueva Isla (dir. Irene Gutierrez)

2014 – When the Bell Rings (dir. by Brad Bores)

=== Audience Award (Louisiana Feature) ===
2019 – Mossville: When Great Trees Fall (dir. Alexander Glustrom)

2018 – This Taco Truck Kills Fascists (dir. Rodrigo Dorfman)

2017 – Do U Want It? (dir. Josh Freund + Sam Radutzky)

2015 – Delta Justice: The Isleños Trappers War (dir. David DuBos)

2014 – Big Charity (dir. Alexander Glustrom)

=== Audience Award (Narrative Feature) ===
2019 – Straight Up (dir. James Sweeney)

2018 – Solace (dir Tchaiko Omewale)

2017 – Sambá (dir. Laura Amelia Guzman + Israel Cardenas)

2016 – My First Kiss and the People Involved (dir. Luigi Campi)

2015 – Driving While Black (dir. Paul Sapiano)

=== Best Louisiana Feature Award ===
2026 – Unseen Olympiad (dir. Casey Shaw)

2020 – To Decadence with Love, Thanks for Everything! (dir. Stuart Sox)

2019 – The Long Shadow (dir. Daniel Lafrentz)

2018 – The True Don Quixote (dir. Chris Poché)

2017 – Buckjumping (dir. Lily Keber) tied with A Tuba to Cuba (dir. T.G. Herrington & Danny Clinch)

2016 – Five Awake (dir. Donna Dees, Susan Willis)

2015 – Consequence (dir. Jonathan Nguyen, Ashley George)

2014 – Big Charity (dir. Alexander Glustrom)
