= St. Clair Bourne =

American filmmaker (1943–2007)

St. Clair C. Bourne
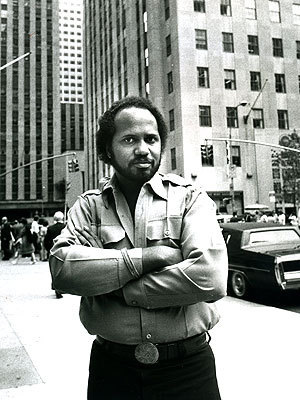
- St.Clair C. Bourne
- Born: February 16, 1943; Harlem, New York
- Died: December 15, 2007 (aged 64); Manhattan, New York
- Occupation: Filmmaker
- Known for: American documentary filmmaker of African-American social issues and themes

St. Clair C. Bourne (February 16, 1943 – December 15, 2007) was an African-American documentary filmmaker, whose work focused on subjects and social issues of concern to the African-American community. He also developed projects that explored African-American cultural figures, such as Langston Hughes and Paul Robeson. Not only was Bourne a towering figure in the documentary film world but also an activist, teacher, and organizer.

== Biography ==
Born to African-American parents in Harlem, New York, Bourne's mother was a nurse and his father was journalist St. Clair T. Bourne. The father also wrote scripts for African American documentary filmmakers William Alexander and Edward Lewis.

Bourne's family moved to Brooklyn when he was two years old. After high school, he completed two years at the Georgetown School of Foreign Service before joining the Peace Corps. In 1965, the Peace Corps sent Bourne to Peru where he helped publish a Spanish newspaper, El Comeno, in Comas, a settlement adjacent to Lima. The November 1965 issue of Ebony magazine featured an article about Bourne's efforts in Comas. After the Peace Corps, Bourne attended Syracuse University, graduating in 1967 with a dual degree in Journalism and Political Science.

In 1988, a retrospective of his films was shown at the Whitney Museum of American Art. In a 36-year career in which he made more than 40 films, either producing or directing or doing both, Bourne's works were seen on public television, commercial networks and at film festivals around the country.

Bourne died in Manhattan of pulmonary embolisms following brain surgery on December 15, 2007. He was 64 years old.

He was a member of the Omega Psi Phi and Alpha Phi Omega Fraternities.

The finding aid to the St. Clair Bourne Collection can be found at the Black Film Center/Archive at Indiana University, Bloomington, IN.

== Filmography ==
- America--Black and White (undated)
- General (1965, 1988–2002)
- Malcolm X Liberation University: Black Journal (1969)
- Something to Build On (1971)
- Let the Church Say Amen! (1974)
- The Black and the Green (1982–84)
- In Motion: Amiri Baraka (1983)
- On the Boulevard (1985)
- Langston Hughes: The Dream Keeper (1986, 1988)
- The Making of "Do The Right Thing" (1988–89)
- Where Roots Endure (1989)
- Sea Island Journey (1993)
- Heritage of the Black West (1995)
- John Henrik Clarke: A Great and Mighty Walk (1996)
- Paul Robeson: Here I Stand (1999)
- Half Past Autumn (2000)
