= False confession =

Admission of guilt for a crime one did not commit

A false confession is an admission of guilt for a crime which the individual did not commit. Although such confessions seem counterintuitive, they can be made voluntarily, perhaps to protect a third party, or induced through coercive interrogation techniques. When some degree of coercion is involved, studies have found that subjects with low intelligence or with mental disorders are more likely to make such confessions. Young people are particularly vulnerable to confessing, especially when stressed, tired, or traumatized, and have a significantly higher rate of false confessions than adults. Many people have been convicted and punished for crimes they did not commit.

Although most false confessions are coerced, some are voluntary. While coerced confessions have long been considered too unreliable to produce valid convictions, more sophisticated psychological interrogation methods may also produce false confessions.

== Types ==
False confessions can be categorized into three general types, as outlined by American Saul Kassin in an article for Current Directions in Psychological Science:

=== Voluntary false confessions ===
These confessions are given freely, without police prompting. Sometimes people incriminate themselves to divert attention from the actual person who committed the crime. For instance, a parent might confess to save their child from jail. Alternatively, people sometimes confess to a notorious crime because of the attention they receive from such a confession. About 250 people confessed to the 1932 kidnapping of the Lindbergh baby which received headlines around the world. Approximately 500 people confessed to the murder of Elizabeth Short (known as the "Black Dahlia") in 1947 which also received enormous media attention—some of those who confessed were not even born when she died.

A more recent example of a false voluntary confession occurred in 2006, when John Mark Karr confessed to the murder of six-year-old JonBenét Ramsey in the United States. Karr had become obsessed with every detail of the murder and, ten years after her death, he was extradited from Thailand based on his confession. But his account did not match details of the case, and his DNA did not match that found at the crime scene. His wife and brother also said he was home in another state at the time of the murder, and had never been to Colorado, where the murder occurred. His confession was so clearly false that prosecutors never charged him with the crime.

=== Coerced compliant confessions ===
These confessions are the result of coercive interrogation techniques used by the police. Suspects may be interviewed for hours on end, sometimes without a lawyer or family member present. Even when the suspect is innocent, this creates stress and eventually leads to mental exhaustion. Sometimes, police offer inducements to suspects, telling them they will be treated more leniently if they confess. Material rewards such as coffee or the cessation of the interrogation are used to the same effect. Suspects may be told they will feel better by confessing, thereby getting the truth out in the open. After enduring this pressure, often for hours on end, vulnerable suspects may confess just to bring the process to an end.

The Reid technique codifies these strategies and is still used by many police forces in the United States. People may also confess to a crime they did not commit as a form of plea bargaining in order to avoid the risk of a harsher sentence after trial. Teenagers and young adults, individuals with mental health problems or low intelligence and those who achieve scores high on the Gudjonsson Suggestibility Scale are more vulnerable to making false confessions.

=== Coerced internalized confessions ===
These confessions are those in which the person is so affected by the interrogation process, they come to believe they have actually committed the crime, even though they have no memory of doing so. This seems to occur when the suspect lacks self-confidence, especially in their own memory about a particular event. Research suggests "An interrogator can take advantage of this weakness, sometimes unwittingly, through highly suggestive questioning and proffered explanations for the suspect's alleged lack of memory." The suspect is unable to detect that they are being manipulated into agreeing with something that is not true and begins to agree with the interrogator "until he or she finally comes to accept guilt".

== Factors involved ==
To the average person, the possibility that someone would confess to a crime they did not commit seems highly unlikely and makes little sense. The following factors have been found to contribute to false confessions.

=== Police mindset ===
Police use persuasive manipulation techniques when conducting interrogations in hopes of obtaining a confession. These can include lying about evidence, making suspects believe they are there to help them or pretending to be the suspect's friends. After enough time and persuasion, suspects are likely to conform to the investigators' demands for a confession, even if it was to a crime they did not commit. One of the most important findings in guilt manipulation research is that once guilt is induced in the subject, it can be directed into greater compliance with requests that are completely unrelated to the original source of guilt. This has important implications for police interrogation because guilt induction is recommended in manuals on police interrogation.

A 2010 study conducted by Fisher and Geiselman showed the lack of instruction given to entry-level police officers regarding the interview process. They stated in their research that, "We were discouraged to find that police often receive only minimal, and sometimes no, formal training to interview cooperative witnesses, and, not surprisingly, their actual interview practices are quite poor." While many officers may develop their own interview techniques, the lack of formal training could lead to interviewing with the purpose of simply completing the investigation, regardless of the truth. The easiest way to complete an investigation would be a confession. Fisher and Geiselman concur, saying, "It seems to be more on interrogating suspects (to elicit confessions) rather than on interviewing cooperative witnesses and victims". This study suggests that more training could prevent false confessions, and give police a new mindset while in the interview room.

=== Reid technique ===
The Reid technique of interrogating suspects was first introduced in the United States in the 1940s and 50s by former police officer John Reid. It was intended to replace the beatings that police frequently used to elicit information. The technique involves a nine-step process. The first step involves directly confronting the suspect with a statement that it is known that they committed the crime. This would usually involve frequent interruptions when the suspect tried to speak. Researchers have found that police interrogators only allowed people to speak for an average of 5.8 seconds before they interrupted. Often, the police lie and describe non-existent evidence that points to the suspect as the offender. In the second step, the police present a hypothesis about why the suspect committed the crime. This explanation "minimizes the moral implications of the alleged offense or allows a suspect to save face by having a morally acceptable excuse for committing the crime."

The Reid technique went on to become the leading interrogation method used by law enforcement throughout the United States and led to countless confessions. In recent years, justice researchers found that not all of those confessions were legitimate and determined that the technique primarily relies on deception, coercion and aggressive confrontation to secure confessions. Despite this, in 2014, it was still popular with police interrogators even though subjects provide less information, and the strategy provides fewer true confessions and more false confessions than less confrontational interviewing techniques.

In 2017, Wicklander-Zulawski & Associates, one of the biggest consulting groups responsible for training law enforcement officers throughout the United States, announced that because of its coercive methods, it would no longer use the Reid technique.

=== Individual vulnerability ===
In the Journal of the American Academy of Psychiatry and the Law, Richard Leo wrote: "Even though psychological coercion is the primary cause of police-induced false confessions, individuals differ in their ability to withstand interrogation pressure and thus in their susceptibility to making false confessions. All other things being equal, those who are highly suggestible or compliant are more likely to confess falsely. Individuals who are highly suggestible tend to have poor memories, high levels of anxiety, low self-esteem, and low assertiveness, personality factors that also make them more vulnerable to the pressures of interrogation and thus more likely to confess falsely. Interrogative suggestibility tends to be heightened by sleep deprivation, fatigue, and drug or alcohol withdrawal. Individuals who are highly compliant tend to be conflict avoidant, acquiescent, and eager to please others, especially authority figures." In particular, this tends to apply to individuals who are intellectually impaired or suffer from mental health issues.

==== Intellectual impairment ====
According to Richard Leo, the developmentally disabled are more likely to confess for a number of reasons. "First, because of their subnormal intellectual functioning, low intelligence, short attention span, poor memory, and poor conceptual and communication skills, they do not always understand statements made to them or the implications of their answers. They often lack the ability to think in a causal way about the consequences of their actions." This also affects their social intelligence. Leo says: "They are not, for example, likely to understand that the police detective who appears to be friendly is really their adversary or to grasp the long-term consequences of making an incriminating statement. They are thus highly suggestible and easy to manipulate ... (they are also) eager to please. They tend to have a high need for approval and thus are prone to being acquiescent."

The case of Canadian Simon Marshall is an example and was one of Quebec's most notorious miscarriages of justice. Marshall was mentally disabled, and accused of a series of rapes in 1997. He confessed to thirteen charges, and was convicted and imprisoned for five years. While in prison he was beaten, sodomized, and scalded with boiling water by other prisoners. Eventually DNA testing established that Marshall was not involved in the crimes. Despite being released, Marshall continues to live in a state of "semi-detention"; he is being held in a psychiatric hospital due to the psychological damage caused during his incarceration. He was awarded $2.3-million in compensation. An inquiry into the case made the point that not only had DNA testing not been done at the time of his trial, Marshall's mental handicap was entirely overlooked throughout his prosecution.

==== Mental illness ====
Individuals who are mentally ill tend to have a number of symptoms which predispose them to agreeing with or confabulating false and misleading information. In the Journal of the American Academy of Psychiatry and the Law, Richard Leo wrote that these "include faulty reality monitoring, distorted perceptions and beliefs, an inability to distinguish fact from fantasy, proneness to feelings of guilt, heightened anxiety, mood disturbances, and a lack of self control. In addition, the mentally ill may suffer from deficits in executive functioning, attention, and memory; become easily confused; and lack social skills such as assertiveness. These traits also increase the risk of falsely confessing."

==== Youth and immaturity ====
Saul Kassin, a leading expert on false confessions, says that young people are also particularly vulnerable to confessing, especially when stressed, tired, or traumatized. In the Central Park Jogger case, for example, five teenagers aged from 14 to 16 falsely confessed to assault and rape of a white woman in Manhattan's Central Park on April 19, 1989. The police ignored the fact that none of the suspects' DNA matched two semen samples found on the victim. Both samples belonged to a single source, Matias Reyes, a violent serial rapist and murderer who finally confessed to the Central Park rape in 2002.

== Incidence ==
The incidence of false confession, and its causes, are likely to vary from one country to another. The rate also varies depending on the methodology used to measure it. Some studies only use confirmed cases where DNA proved the person who confessed was in fact innocent and has been exonerated by a court. This mostly applies to murder and rape cases. For instance, in the United States, the Innocence Project reports that since 1989, 375 offenders have been exonerated by DNA evidence. Twenty-nine percent of them confessed to the crime for which they were convicted and later exonerated. As of July 2020, twenty-three of the 104 people whose cases involved false confessions had exculpatory DNA evidence available at the time of trial – but were still wrongfully convicted. According to the National Registry of Exonerations in the United States, 27% of those on the registry who were accused of homicide, but were later exonerated, gave false confessions. However, 81% of people with mental illness or intellectual disabilities also confessed when accused of homicide. Offenders may also be exonerated by means other than DNA evidence.

Of the 2,750 people exonerated in US between 1989 and 2023, nine percent were women. Nearly 73 percent of women exonerated in those years were convicted of crimes that never took place at all, according to data from the National Registry of Exonerations. Their alleged "crimes" included: events determined to be accidents; crimes that were fabricated; and deaths by suicide. About 40 percent of female exonerees were wrongly convicted of harming their children or other loved ones in their care.

Other studies use self-report surveys where offenders are asked if they have ever falsely confessed to a crime, although there may be no way of checking the validity of such claims. These surveys apply to confessions to any kind of crime, not just rape and murder. Two Icelandic studies based on self-report conducted ten years apart found the rates of false confession to be 12.2% and 24.4% respectively. A more recent Scottish study found the rate of self-reported false confessions was 33.4%.

== Impact on judicial process ==
Leo noted that "most people assume that a confession, especially a detailed confession, is, by its very nature, true. Confession evidence therefore tends to define the case against a defendant, usually overriding any contradictory information or evidence of innocence. A suspect's confession sets in motion a seemingly irrefutable presumption of guilt among justice officials, the media, the public, and lay jurors. This chain of events in effect leads each part of the system to be stacked against the individual who confesses, and as a result he is treated more harshly at every stage of the investigative and trial process. He is significantly more likely to be incarcerated before trial, charged, pressured to plead guilty, and convicted".

As Justice Brennan noted in his dissent in Colorado v. Connelly: "Reliance on confessions is due, in part, to their decisive impact upon the adversarial process. Triers of fact accord confessions such heavyweight in their determinations that 'the introduction of a confession makes the other aspects of a trial in court superfluous, and the real trial, for all practical purposes, occurs when the confession is obtained.' No other class of evidence is so profoundly prejudicial. 'Thus the decision to confess before trial amounts in effect to a waiver of the right to require the state at trial to meet its heavy burden of proof'."

Leo argued that false confessions gather collective force as the judicial process proceeds, and become almost impossible to overcome. He noted that "this chain reaction starts with the police. Once they obtain a confession, they typically close their investigation, clear the case as solved, and make no effort to pursue any exculpatory evidence or other possible leads, even if the confession is internally inconsistent, contradicted by external evidence, or the result of coercive interrogation. Even when other case evidence subsequently emerges suggesting or demonstrating that the suspect's confession is false, police almost always continue to believe in the suspect's guilt and the underlying accuracy of the confession."

== Remedial strategies ==
=== Better police training ===
Researchers argue that the police need to be trained better at identifying the circumstances which contribute to false confessions and the type of suspects inclined to make them. The Wicklander-Zulawski method has been deployed extensively across U.S. based Federal, State, and Local Law Enforcement post 2017 to combat false confessions via an ethical, non-confrontational, evidence based investigating interview system. The WZ Method focuses on rapport building and does not allow deception or coercive tactics in order to obtain guilty admission. Additionally in the early 1990s, British psychologists collaborated with law enforcement to develop a more conversational approach to obtain information from suspects. This approach, which is more ethical and less confrontational, became known as the PEACE method of interrogation.

The method has five stages: Preparation and Planning; Engage and Explain; Account, Clarification, Challenge; Closure; and Evaluation. Using this approach, investigators are not supposed to interrupt suspects while they tell their story; use open‐ended questions; and challenge any inconsistencies or contradictions after the subject has told their story. Also interviewers are not allowed to deceive or pretend they have incriminating evidence they do not actually have.

=== Taping interrogations and confessions ===
In response to the prevalence of false confessions induced by aggressive police interrogation methods, one suggested solution has been to videotape all interrogations so that what occurred can be monitored by the legal defense team and by jury members. This solution stems from the perception that videotaped interrogations and confessions allow for a more complete and objective record of the police–suspect interaction. Those who advocate for the videotaping of interrogations argue that the presence of the camera will deter the use of coercive methods to induce confessions and will provide a visual and auditory record which can be used to evaluate the voluntariness and potential veracity of any confession.

However, a study in the Journal of Psychiatry & Law notes that videotaping on its own "will not solve the problem of false confessions occurring nor will it ensure that false confessions will be detected before an innocent life is ruined". The authors argue that "More needs to be done with regard to reforming how police go about interviewing/interrogating suspects in the first place".

==== In the US ====
Until the 1980s, most confession evidence was recorded by police and later presented at trial in either a written or an audiotaped format. Electronic recording of interrogations was first mandated in the United States in Alaska in 1985 by the Supreme Court of Alaska in Stephan v. State—based on the state constitution's due process clause. In 2019, 21 states plus the District of Columbia require recording by law in serious cases. Many other cities have voluntarily implemented electronic recording as best practice, including Philadelphia, Boston, San Diego, San Francisco, Denver, Portland, and Austin. Electronic recording of interrogations has become mandatory in approximately 1,000 law enforcement agencies across the country.

==== In the United Kingdom ====
In England and Wales, the Police and Criminal Evidence Act of 1984 built certain protections into the questioning process, including the requirement that all suspect interviews be taped.

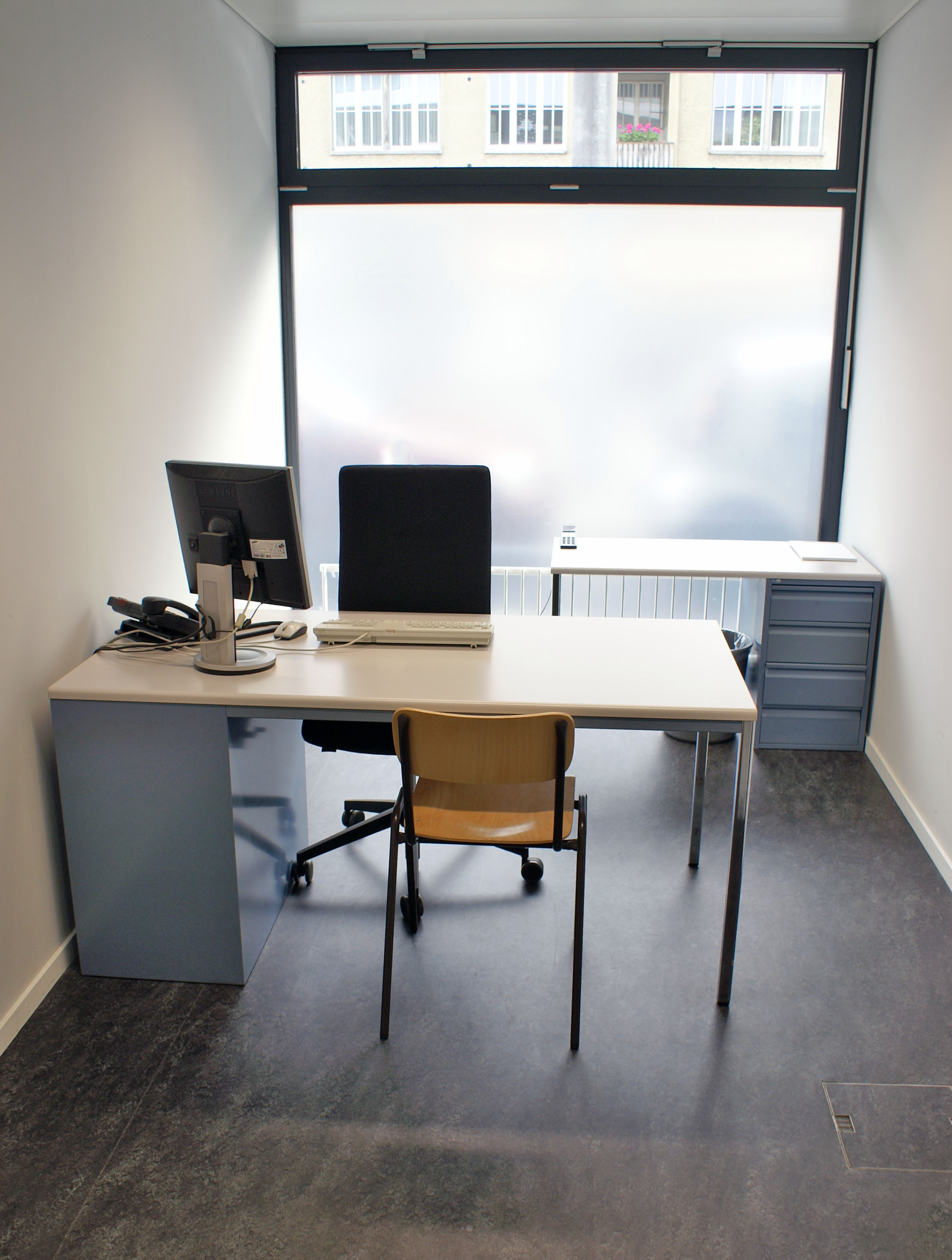
A police interrogation room

=== Concerns about videotaping ===
==== Camera perspective bias ====
Psychological research suggests that evaluations of videotaped confessions can be affected by the camera perspective used at the initial recording. Extensive empirical data has been collected in this area by manipulating the position of the camera: to a suspect-focus (looking at the front of the suspect from waist up and the back of the detective's head and shoulders), detective-focus (looking at the front of the detective and the back of the suspect), and equal-focus (where the profiles of both the detective and the suspect were equally visible) perspective. The research indicates that the camera perspective influences assessments of voluntariness, the level of coercion on the part of the detective, and even the dichotomy of guilt.

Changes in camera perspective lead to changes in the visual content available to the observer. Using eye-tracking as a measure and monitor of visual attention, researchers deduced that visual attention mediates the camera perspective bias. That is, the correlation between camera perspective and the resulting bias is caused by the viewer's visual attention, which is decided by the focus of the camera.

In the United States and in many other countries, interrogations are typically recorded with the camera positioned behind the interrogator and focused directly on the suspect. These suspect-focus videotapes lead to the perception that the subject is participating voluntarily, when compared to both audiotapes and transcripts, which are assumed to be bias-free. In other words, the manner in which videotaping is implemented holds the potential for bias. This bias can be avoided by using an equal-focus perspective. This finding has been replicated numerous times, reflecting the growing uses of videotaped confessions in trial proceedings.

==== Racial salience bias ====
Psychological research has explored camera perspective bias with African American and Chinese American suspects. African Americans are victims to strong stereotypes linking them with criminal behavior, but these stereotypes are not prevalent towards Chinese Americans, making the two ethnicities ideal for comparison. Participants were randomly assigned to view mock police interrogations developed using a male Caucasian detective questioning a Caucasian, Chinese American, or African American male suspect regarding his whereabouts at a given time and date. All interrogations were taped in an equal-focus perspective. Voluntariness judgments varied as a function of the race of the suspect. More participants viewing the Chinese American suspect and the African American suspect versions of the interrogation judged the suspect's statements to be voluntary than did those viewing the Caucasian suspect version. Both the African American suspect and the Chinese American suspect were judged to have a higher likelihood of guilt than the Caucasian suspect. Racial salience bias in videotaped interrogations is a genuine phenomenon that has been proven through empirical data.

=== Policy recommendations ===
Research indicates that an equal focus perspective produces relatively unbiased assessments of videotaped interrogations. A variation of the equal focus perspective is the dual camera approach where the subject's and the interviewer's faces are presented side-by-side. One study into this approach suggests it eliminates the usual camera perspective bias on voluntariness and guilt judgments, but was no better than the infamous suspect-focus condition in terms of its impact on the ability to accurately distinguish between true and false confession.

To aid criminal-justice practitioners and legal policy makers to achieve sound and fair policy, a study in Behavioral Sciences and the Law presented the following recommendations based on the body of research:

- Custodial interrogations recorded in their entirety with the camera positioned so that the resultant videotape displays an equal-focus or detective-focus perspective.
- If an interrogation has already been videotaped from a suspect-focus perspective, it should not be used. Rather, the use of an audio track or a transcript derived from the videotape should serve in its place.
- The dual-camera approach is not advised because it does nothing to moderate actual accuracy of judgments.

== Cases by country ==
=== Japan ===
Iwao Hakamata was convicted of murder largely because of a forced confession coerced through threats and violence, spending 57 years behind bars and becoming the world's longest-serving death row inmate. He was acquitted when DNA evidence showed that he could not have been the killer.

In 2007, thirteen men and women, ranging in age from their early 50s to mid-70s, were arrested and indicted in Japan for buying votes in an election. Six confessed to buying votes with liquor, cash and catered parties. All were acquitted in 2007 in a local district court, which found that the confessions had been entirely fabricated. The presiding judge said the defendants had "made confessions in despair while going through marathon questioning."

=== New Zealand ===
- Mauha Fawcett
- Teina Pora

=== Sweden ===
==== Sture Bergwall (1990) ====
Sture Bergwall, also known as Thomas Quick, confessed to more than 30 murders in Sweden, Norway, Denmark, and Finland while incarcerated in a mental institution for personality disorders. He had been committed after being convicted of less serious crimes. Between 1994 and 2001, Bergwall was convicted of eight murders, based on his confessions. All of these convictions have now been overturned on appeal as he was found to have made false confessions and been incompetent to stand trial.

=== United Kingdom ===
==== Robert Hubert (1666) ====
In 1666, Robert Hubert confessed to starting the Great Fire of London by throwing a fire bomb through a bakery window. It was proven during his trial that he had not been in the country until two days after the start of the fire, he was never at any point near the bakery in question, the bakery did not have windows, and he was crippled and unable to throw a bomb. But, as a foreigner (a Frenchman), and a Catholic, Hubert was a perfect scapegoat. Ever-maintaining his guilt, Hubert was brought to trial, found guilty, and duly executed by hanging.

==== Rillington Place (1949) ====
Timothy Evans was accused of murdering his wife, Beryl and their infant daughter, Geraldine. Three years after the conviction and execution of Evans for the murder, it was discovered that their neighbour, John Reginald Christie, known as Reg Christie had murdered at least six other women whose bodies were found at 10 Rillington Place, the building which he had shared with the Evans family and other tenants.

In November 1949, Beryl Evans, finding she was pregnant and fearful of their ability to cope, began seeking ways to end her pregnancy. Christie, a former police special constable, falsely purported to be able to perform a – then illegal – abortion. It was arranged that he would carry out a termination procedure on Beryl at their home while Evans was at work. When Evans returned home later that day, Christie advised him that Beryl had died as result of the attempted termination. Because of the death and their possible legal jeopardy, Christie recommended that Evans absent himself, while Christie was purportedly to arrange for removal of Beryl's body and for care of their daughter while Evans was away. Evans left London for Wales; while staying with relatives there, however, overcome with distress, he alerted police to his wife's death. He told them where they would find the body, according to information he had been given by Christie. Unaware of the true circumstances of Beryl's death, or that his baby daughter had been killed, Evans gave statements that were inconsistent. He left Christie's name out of his account, so as to avoid implicating him in the abortion and fabricated his own involvement in the procedure as an explanation of what caused Beryl's death.

When the Notting Hill police in London investigated, they found Beryl's body not where Evans had indicated, and with a ligature around her neck with little to indicate that a termination of pregnancy had been attempted. They also discovered the baby, Geraldine, had been killed. While Evans initially made no mention of Christie's involvement in the attempted abortion, he changed his account later. These inconsistencies placed him under further suspicion for the killings. When confronted with the condition of the victims and their manner of death, and for the first time understanding his daughter had been killed, Evans replied "Yes" when the chief inspector stated that police believed him to be responsible. His later, formal confession was found to have been dictated to Evans by investigators, a conclusion based on Evans' verbal ability, lower mental age and education level. Evans withdrew that confession soon after he had access to legal advice. Workmen who had renovated and cleaned out the wash-house where the bodies of Beryl and Geraldine were later found, were witness to the wash-house being empty after the time Evans had left for Wales. Their evidence was known to police. There was little forensic evidence. Despite this, Evans was tried for the murder of his daughter. Reg Christie and his wife were the principal prosecution witnesses at the trial. Evans was convicted and hanged.

The safety of the conviction was thrown into doubt when the bodies of other murder victims, including Christie's wife Ethel, were uncovered at Rillington Place. The poorly concealed remains, which included a femur being used as a prop in the small garden, out in the open at the time Beryl and Geraldine's bodies were discovered, and a skull disinterred on the property by a pet dog at around the same time, suggest there was no systematic approach to the examination of the scene of crime. Most of the newly discovered victims had been strangled using a ligature. Two had been murdered after the murders of the Evanses. Christie confessed to the murders, including Beryl's, but not to Geraldine's. Evans was pardoned posthumously in 1966. The case has been cited as an important part of the impetus for abolishing capital punishment in the United Kingdom.

==== Stephen Downing (1974) ====
Stephen Downing was convicted and spent 27 years in prison. The main evidence against him was a confession he signed. He had agreed to this after an 8-hour interrogation which left him confused, and his poor literacy skills meant he did not fully understand what he was signing. He was released from prison in 2001 pending appeal. His conviction was quashed in 2002 on the basis of the unreliability of Downing's confessions. A 2003 report of an independently supervised police reinvestigation – as agreed by Downing's family and legal advisors – found that Downing remained the only suspect unable to be eliminated. Police have stated that in the absence of fresh leads, the murder case will remain closed.

==== Stefan Kiszko (1976) ====
Stefan Kiszko was convicted of murder in 1976, in what was later described as "one of Britain's most notorious miscarriages of justice". Kiszko had no previous legal problems and was described by neighbours as gentle and softly spoken. Although he was in stable employment as a tax office clerk, he had a life-long medical condition and an intellectual disability, and was assessed as having a social-emotional age equivalent to that of a 12-year-old. The principal evidence against Kiszko was his confession, made after three days of police questioning, without access to legal advice or, as he repeatedly requested, to his mother, his sole remaining family member. When asked why he had confessed to a crime he did not commit, Kiszko replied, "I started to tell these lies and they seemed to please them and the pressure was off as far as I was concerned. I thought if I admitted what I did to the police they would check out what I had said, find it untrue and would then let me go".

During his imprisonment, Kiszko's mother and aunt, convinced of his innocence, conducted a campaign to have his case reviewed. In 1987, solicitor Campbell Malone became involved. He, along with other legal professionals, prepared submissions to the Home Office, which was convinced in 1991 to order a reinvestigation. New police investigators soon found that the first inquiry had made serious errors. It was also found that tests ordered by the initial investigating officers had clearly demonstrated Kiszko's innocence: A sample of semen obtained from Kiszko while in custody was compared with semen stains on Lesley Molseed's clothing. From this comparison, performed before the trial, police became aware that Kiszko's medical condition rendered him sterile, thus incapable of producing any sperm; the semen stains on the victim's garments was shown to have sperm present. Two police investigators and a forensic scientist on the case were charged in 1994 with suppressing evidence. Kiszko was fully exonerated in 1992.

In 1999 retained samples collected from the clothing of Molseed was found to incidentally contain sperm cell heads. Forensic scientists were able to extract a genetic profile of the offender. In 2006, a complete match to the profile was obtained when the DNA of Ronald Castree was obtained in connection to another matter. He was prosecuted for the murder of Lesley Molseed, convicted and sentenced to life with a 30-year minimum.

=== United States ===
==== Peter Reilly (1973) ====
In 1973, 18-year-old Peter Reilly of Litchfield County, Connecticut, was convicted of first-degree manslaughter in the death of his mother, Barbara Gibbons. Reilly discovered the body of his mother, who had been stabbed, and immediately reported the crime. Police suspected him on the basis of his demeanour, deeming it to be unemotional. Reilly was detained and interrogated for over twenty hours with little sleep. During this interrogation, with no lawyer present, he agreed to undergo a polygraph, which he was falsely told he had failed, and was persuaded that only he could have committed the crime. He signed a detailed confession, which was admitted into evidence at trial. He was convicted and sentenced to six to sixteen years for manslaughter.

Reilly was freed on appeal in 1976 and granted another trial with newly presented evidence. Fingerprint evidence placed an outside party at the residence, connecting brothers Timothy and Michael Parmalee, who had been in dispute with Gibbons, to the scene. A married couple, one of whom was a state trooper, witnessed Reilly driving at the time of the murder, in accord with Reilly's own account. This evidence was known to the prosecution at the time of the first trial but was not disclosed to the defense. All charges were subsequently dropped. Connecticut's superior court ruled in June 1977 that Reilly had been subjected to improper police and prosecutorial conduct.

==== Pizza Hut murder (1988) ====
In 1988, Nancy DePriest was raped and murdered at the Pizza Hut where she worked in Austin, Texas. A coworker, Chris Ochoa, pleaded guilty to the murder. His friend and coworker, Richard Danziger, was convicted of the rape. Ochoa confessed to the murder, as well as implicating Danziger in the rape. The only forensic evidence linking Danziger to the crime scene was a single pubic hair found in the restaurant, which was said to be consistent with his pubic hair type. Although semen evidence had been collected, a DNA analysis of only one gene was performed at the time; even though Ochoa had this gene, it was known also to be present in 10–16% of individuals. Both men received life sentences with no possibility of parole.

In 1996, Achim Josef Marino, a prisoner serving three-life sentences for a string of robberies and rapes, began writing letters from prison claiming he was the actual murderer in the Pizza Hut case and that Ochoa and Danziger were innocent. He continued writing letters until the two men were freed from prison. Marino stated his confession letters were prompted by his conversion to Christianity; he wanted to tell the truth to free the innocent men. DNA from the crime scene had been retained and was retested in 2001–2002, using more modern methods. The DNA matched that of Marino, while that of Ochoa and Danziger was able to be excluded. Ochoa later said that he was coerced by the police, who denied him access to a lawyer during an hours-long interrogation, to confess or he would receive a death sentence, and to implicate his friend in the rape and murder.

In 2001, Ochoa and Danziger were released from prison after 12 years of incarceration. While in prison, Danziger had been severely beaten by other inmates in 1991 and suffered permanent brain damage. He required all day medical care for the rest of his life. The two were fully exonerated, Marino was later convicted of the murder in 2002 and was given an additional life sentence. Due to the length of time since the crime had occurred, the statute of limitations meant he could not be charged with the rape. Richard Danziger died in 2021.

==== Jeffrey Mark Deskovic (1990) ====
Jeffrey Mark Deskovic was convicted in 1990, at the age of 16, of raping, beating and strangling a high school classmate. He had confessed to the crime after hours of interrogation by police without being given an opportunity to seek legal counsel. Court testimony noted that the DNA evidence in the case did not point to him. He was incarcerated for 16 years before DNA testing in 2006 implicated a man named Steven Cunningham; Cunningham would ultimately confess to the murder, and Deskovic was released in September 2006.

==== Laverne Pavlinac (1990) ====
Laverne Pavlinac confessed that she and her boyfriend murdered a woman in Oregon in 1990. They were convicted and sentenced to prison. Five years later, Keith Hunter Jesperson confessed to a series of murders, including that of the woman. Pavlinac had become obsessed with details of the crime during interrogation by police. She later said she confessed to get out of the abusive relationship with the boyfriend. Her boyfriend pleaded "no contest" to the charge in order to avoid the death penalty.

==== Juan Rivera (1992) ====
Juan Rivera, from Waukegan, Illinois, was wrongfully convicted of the 1992 rape and murder of 11-year-old Holly Staker. Although his DNA was excluded from that tested in the rape kit, and the report from the electronic ankle monitor he was wearing at the time (while awaiting trial for a non-violent burglary) established that he was not in the vicinity of the murder, he confessed to the crimes. Rivera had been interrogated for several days by police using the Reid technique. His conviction was overturned in 2011, and the appellate court took the unusual step of barring prosecutors from retrying him.

Rivera filed a lawsuit against a number of parties, including John E. Reid & Associates, who developed the Reid technique. Reid contended that Rivera's false confession was the result of the Reid technique being used incorrectly. Rivera was taken to Reid headquarters in Chicago twice during his interrogation for polygraph tests. These were inconclusive, but a Reid employee, Michael Masokas, told Rivera that he failed. The case was settled out of court with Reid & Associates paying $2 million.

==== Gary Gauger (1993) ====
Gary Gauger was sentenced to death for the murders of his parents, Morris, 74, and Ruth, 70, at their McHenry County, Illinois farm in April 1993. He was interrogated for more than 21 hours. He gave the police a hypothetical statement, which they took as a confession. His conviction was overturned in 1996, and Gauger was freed. He was pardoned by the Illinois governor in 2002. Two motorcycle gang members were later convicted of Morris and Ruth Gauger's murders.

==== West Memphis Three (1993) ====
The West Memphis Three (Damien Echols, Jason Baldwin, and Jessie Misskelley) were convicted for the 1993 murders of three 8-year-old boys. At the time of the alleged crime, they were 16, 17, and 18 years old. One month after the murders, police interrogated Misskelley, who has an IQ of 72, for five hours. He confessed to the murders and implicated both Echols and Baldwin.

Misskelley immediately recanted and said he was coerced to confess. Although his confession contained massive internal inconsistencies and differed significantly from the facts of the physical evidence revealed, the prosecution continued. Misskelley and Baldwin were convicted of murder and sentenced to life in prison without parole; Echols was convicted and sentenced to death.

For the next 17 years, the three men maintained their innocence. In August 2011, testing of DNA evidence was found to be inconclusive; it included DNA from an unknown contributor. Prosecutors offered the three men a deal if they pleaded guilty: to release them for time served. They accepted the Alford plea but said that they would continue to work to clear their names and find the real murderer(s). They were released after eighteen years in prison.

==== Norfolk Four (1997) ====
Danial Williams, Joseph J. Dick Jr., Derek Tice, and Eric C. Wilson are four of five men convicted in the 1997 rape and murder of Michelle Moore-Bosko in Norfolk, Virginia. The convictions of the four were based largely on their confessions, which they have since maintained were coerced after hours of interrogation, during which the men were played off against each other over time. The Mid-Atlantic Innocence Project considers this a miscarriage of justice. Moore-Bosko's parents continue to believe that all those convicted were participants in the crime.

Williams and Dick pleaded guilty to murder, as they had been threatened by the potential of being sentenced to death at a jury trial. They were sentenced to one or more life sentences in prison without the possibility of parole. Tice was convicted of rape and murder and sentenced to death. Wilson was convicted of rape and sentenced to 8½ years in prison. Three other men, Geoffrey A. Farris, John E. Danser and Richard D. Pauley Jr., were also initially indicted with the crime through accusations by others, but their charges were later dropped before trial as Tice would not testify against them. The supporters of the Norfolk Four have offered evidence that purports to prove that the four men are innocent, with no known involvement or connections to the incident. No physical evidence supported their cases. Tice's conviction was overturned, and Williams and Dick received governmental pardons, clearing their names. The four received a settlement from the city of Norfolk and state in 2018.

The fifth man, Omar Ballard, was indicted in 2005 after his DNA was found to match that at the crime scene. He had informally confessed in 1997 but withdrew his statement after being pressured to implicate the four other men. He pleaded guilty to the crime in 2009 in order to avoid the death penalty. A serial rapist and murderer, he was apprehended and sentenced to prison after he pleaded guilty to other crimes of violence against women, and confessed to acting alone. He was sentenced to 100 years in prison, 59 of which were suspended. He is the only man whose DNA matched that found at the scene. He confessed to committing the crime by himself, and said none of the other men indicted and tried were involved. Forensic evidence is consistent with his story that there were no other participants.

==== Michael Crowe (1998) ====
Michael Crowe confessed to the murder of his younger sister Stephanie Crowe in 1998. Michael, 14 at the time, was targeted by the police when he seemed "distant and preoccupied" after Stephanie's body was discovered, and the rest of the family grieved. After two days of intense questioning, Michael admitted to killing Stephanie. His confession was vague and lacked detail; he said he could not remember committing the crime but believed he must have done so based on what the police were telling him. The confession was videotaped by police and showed Michael making statements to the effect of, "I'm only saying this because it's what you want to hear". His admission has been cited as a classic example of a coerced false confession during police interrogation.

Joshua Treadway, a friend of Michael's, was questioned and gave a detailed confession after many hours of interrogation. Aaron Houser, a mutual friend of the boys, was questioned and did not confess but presented a "hypothetical" and incriminating account of the crime under prompting by police interrogators using the Reid technique. All three boys subsequently recanted their statements, claiming coercion. Crowe's confession and Houser's statements to police were later thrown out as coerced by a judge; part of Treadway's confession was also ruled inadmissible.

Even with the confessions ruled out in whole or in part in 1998, prosecutors commenced the trial of the three boys in 1999. During the jury selection process, evidence implicating an unrelated party with the crime belatedly emerged. At the insistence of a public defender in the case, a sweatshirt that had been confiscated within a day of the murder from a neighborhood transient, Richard Tuite, was submitted for retesting to an independent laboratory. Although initial testing by an Escondido Police lab technician had found no blood, the specialist lab found three drops of blood with DNA matching Stephanie's. In later investigations, traces of Stephanie's blood were found on the undershirt Tuite wore while in custody on the night of the killing. (Tuite had been briefly held and questioned on the night; before the murder, two separate calls by worried neighbours reported seeing Tuite looking through windows and attempting to enter homes in the vicinity, but he was not located by officers attending those calls.) The charges against the three boys were dismissed without prejudice. Although this would have allowed the charges to be reinstated at a later date should better evidence be gathered, and despite the DNA linkage to another party, the case languished for two years after the abandoned trial.

In 2001, with no charges having been brought by the Escondido police or San Diego County District Attorney, the District Attorney and the San Diego County Sheriff's Department asked that the case be taken over by the California Department of Justice. Prosecutors charged Richard Tuite with the murder. During his trial, his defense team argued that the three boys who were first charged had been responsible for the crime. Tuite was convicted of the killing as involuntary manslaughter in 2004, but a federal court of appeal overturned the conviction in 2011, ruling that because the trial judge limited cross-examination of a prosecution witness, the trial was unfair. At the second trial in 2013, the jury found him not guilty. The murder of Stephanie Crowe remains unsolved.

In 2012, Superior Court Judge Kenneth So made the rare ruling that Michael Crowe, Treadway, and Houser were factually innocent of the charges, permanently dismissing the City of Escondido case against them. A TV movie was made about the case called The Interrogation of Michael Crowe (2002).

==== Corethian Bell (2000) ====
In 2000, Corethian Bell, who has a diagnosis of intellectual disability, was accused of murdering his mother, Netta Bell, after he had found her body and called police in Cook County, Illinois. Police questioned him for more than 50 hours. He said he eventually confessed to the murder of his mother because police hit him so hard he was knocked off his chair, and because he thought that if he confessed, the interrogations would stop. He believed that he would be able to explain himself to a judge and be set free. His confession was videotaped, but his interrogation was not. At the time Cook County prosecutors were required to videotape murder confessions, but not the preceding interrogations. With his confession on tape, Bell was tried, convicted, and sentenced to jail.

When the DNA at the crime scene was finally tested a year later, it matched that of a serial rapist named DeShawn Boyd. He was already in prison after having been convicted of three other violent sexual assaults, all in the same neighborhood as the Netta Bell murder. Bell filed a civil lawsuit with the help of Herschella Conyers and her University of Chicago Law School students, which was settled by the city in 2006 for $1 million.

==== Tyler Edmonds (2003) ====
In 2003, 13-year-old Tyler Edmonds was pressured by his half-sister, Kristi Fulgham, into confessing to the murder of her husband, Joey Fulgham. Kristi Fulgham, who had committed the murder herself, told Edmonds to take the blame in order to protect her from getting the death penalty, claiming that he would face no punishment due to his age. Edmonds listened to Fulgham, and told detectives that the two of them had murdered Joey Fulgham together. Four days later, Edmonds retracted his confession and gave a second interview, saying he did not know that Joey Fulgham was dead at the time he had left his half-sister's house. However, 14 month later, he would be convicted of Joey Fulgham's murder and sentenced to life in prison, with a requirement to serve 40 years before being eligible for parole. Paradoxically, at Kristi Fulgham's trial in 2006, prosecutors described Edmonds as having been manipulated by his half-sister, something that had not been allowed for in Edmonds' own trial. In 2007, the Mississippi Supreme Court overturned Edmonds' conviction on the basis that his confession had been obtained under questionable means; at a new trial in 2008, a jury would find him innocent. In 2009, Tyler Edmonds would receive a payment of $200,000 by the state for wrongful conviction; he would later receive a settlement of $135,000 in 2017.

==== Kevin Fox (2004) ====
Kevin Fox was interrogated for 14 hours by Will County, Illinois, police before he confessed to the 2004 murder of his 3-year-old daughter, Riley. He was convicted and sentenced to jail. His confession was later ruled to have been coerced. Because of DNA testing, police later identified Scott Eby as the killer. He was a neighbor living a few miles from the Fox family at the time of Riley's murder. Police identified him as the killer while he was serving a 14-year sentence for sex crimes. After questioning and confrontation with the DNA results, Eby confessed and later pleaded guilty.

Kevin Fox was released after serving eight months in jail. The Fox family eventually won an $8 million civil judgment against the county government.

==== Thomas Perez Jr. (2018) ====
Thomas Perez Jr. confessed to the murder of his father under duress after 17 hours of interrogation, during which police claimed they had found his father's body, that they would euthanize his dog as a stray, and other claims. His father, Thomas Perez Sr., was later found alive and on a visit to Perez Jr.'s sister. Perez Jr. received a $900,000 settlement in 2024.

== See also ==
- British Post Office scandal – Ongoing UK legal and political scandal, in which some of the wrongly convicted falsely admitted to the alleged offences
- False evidence – Any information created or obtained illegally in order to sway a verdict in court
- False memory syndrome – Proposed condition of false or biased recollections
- Fingerprint – Biometric identifier
- Iatrogenesis – Causation of harm by any medical activity
- Miscarriage of justice – Unfair outcome in trial
- Police misconduct – Inappropriate conduct or illegal actions by police
