= Suicide by jumping from height =

Suicide method

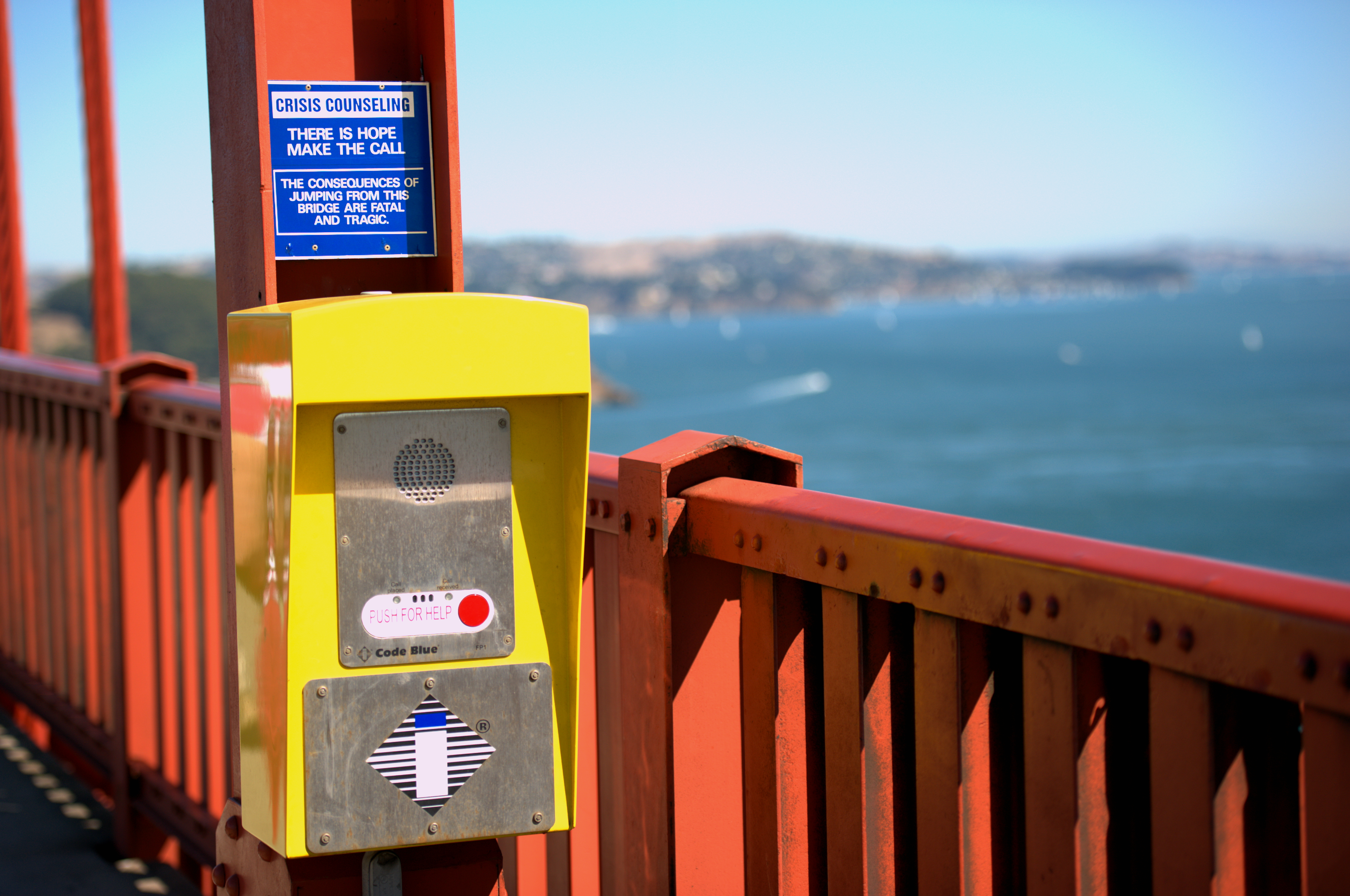
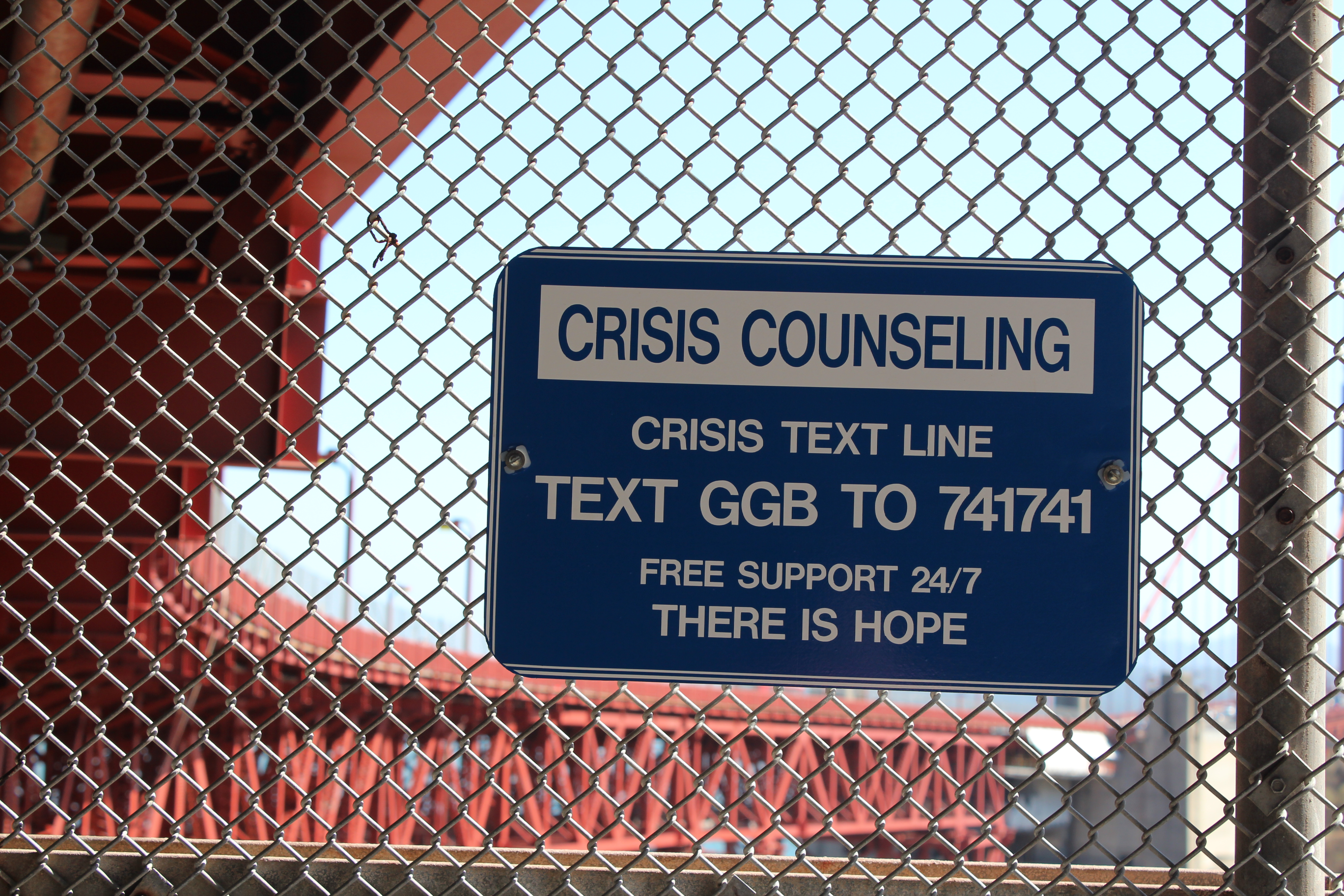
As a suicide prevention initiative, signs on the Golden Gate Bridge promote special telephones that connect to a crisis hotline, as well as a 24/7 crisis text line.

Suicide by jumping from height is a common suicide method where a person jumps and falls from a dangerous location, such as from a high window, balcony, roof, cliff, dam, or bridge. The 2023 ICD-10-CM diagnosis code for jumping from a high place is X80*, and this method of suicide is also known clinically as autokabalesis.

Jumping is the most common method of suicide in Hong Kong, accounting for 52.1% of all reported cases in 2006; such high rates may partially be the result of the city's abundance of high-rise buildings. In the United States, jumping is among the least common methods of suicide (less than 2% of all reported suicides in 2005). However, in a 75-year period to 2012, there had been around 1,400 suicides at the Golden Gate Bridge. In New Zealand, secure fencing at the Grafton Bridge substantially reduced the rate of suicides.

There have been survivor reports regarding the belief that death from falling is an instantaneous process. Jumpers have died from other causes, such as drowning or hypothermia from the cold waters after falling from a bridge. Survivors can experience paralysis and coma as a result of their injuries.

== Method ==
A frequent scenario is that the jumper will sit on an elevated highway or building-ledge as police attempt to talk them down. Observers sometimes encourage potential jumpers to jump, an effect known as "suicide baiting". Suicidal jumpers have sometimes injured or even killed people on the ground on whom they land.

Many countries have noted suicide bridges such as the Nanjing Yangtze River Bridge and the Golden Gate Bridge. Other well known suicide sites for jumping include the Eiffel Tower and Niagara Falls.

In 2002, Nish Bruce, a British veteran, killed himself by leaping without a parachute from an airplane, at an altitude of over 5,000 feet (1,500 m). In 2025, Jade Damarell, a skydiver, died similarly from an altitude of 15,500 feet (4,700 m), having never deployed her parachutes.

=== Jumping out of a window ===
Autodefenestration (or self-defenestration) is the term used for the act of jumping, propelling oneself, or causing oneself to fall, out of a window. This phenomenon played a notable role in such events as the Triangle Shirtwaist fire of 1911, the September 11 attacks on the World Trade Center, and other disasters. It is also a method of suicide. In the United States, self-defenestration is among the least common methods of dying by suicide (less than 2% of all reported suicides in the United States for 2005).

There is an urban legend in the US that many Wall Street investors autodefenestrated during the 1929 stock market crash. After the 2008 financial crisis, this was alluded to by protestors brandishing a sign on Wall Street which said: "Jump, you fuckers!"

== Fatality rate ==
Generally, fatality rate is higher in falls from higher places. Age, height, surface type and body impact area all affect the fatality rate independently. Almost all falls from beyond about 8 stories are fatal, although people have survived much higher falls than this, even onto hard surfaces. For example, one suicidal jumper has survived a fall from the 39th story of a building, as has a non-suicidal window washer who accidentally fell from the 47th floor of a New York City skyscraper. Many people who attempt suicide by jumping from height survive and continue to live disfigured, paralyzed or with permanent brain damage.

== Prevalence ==
Jumping makes up only 3% of suicides in the US and Europe, which is a much smaller percentage than is generally perceived by the public. Jumping mostly occurs in the summer. Jumping makes up 20% of suicides in New York City due to the prevalence of publicly accessible skyscrapers.

In Hong Kong, jumping (from any location) is the most common method of dying by suicide, accounting for 52% of all reported suicide cases in 2006, and similar rates for the years prior to that. The Centre for Suicide Research and Prevention of the University of Hong Kong believes that it may be due to the abundance of easily accessible high-rise buildings in Hong Kong (implying that much of the jumping is out of windows or from roof tops).

There is limited information surrounding the demographics of those who die by jumping. However, some studies find differences between those who jump from high-rise residential buildings and those who jump from a suicide bridge. There is some evidence to suggest that younger males are overrepresented in those who jump from bridges, while age is not a notable factor in suicides from high-rise residential buildings. However, other studies have not found the same patterns.

== Prevention strategies ==
Multiple intervention strategies have been applied for these types of suicides. Some of these strategies take physical forms, such as installing barriers to restrict access at suicide sites or by adding a safety net. In 1996, safety barriers were removed from the Grafton Bridge in Auckland, New Zealand. After their removal, there was a five-fold increase in the number of suicides from the bridge. Other sites have installed signs containing telephone hotline numbers or incorporated surveillance measures such as patrols and trained gatekeepers.

In addition to these measures, there has been a push to more closely monitor media coverage of suicide, especially suicides from well known sites, which typically involve suicide by jumping. Numerous studies have researched the impact of media coverage on suicide rates. Guidelines for media sources on how to cover the topic, such as the "Recommendations for Reporting on Suicide" (developed in collaboration with organizations such as the American Foundation for Suicide Prevention, the National Institute of Mental Health, and several schools of journalism) attempt to reduce the risk of suicide contagion via responsible reporting, informing on the complexities of suicide, and publicizing resources and stories of hope.

Constructing barriers is not the only option, and it can be expensive. Other method-specific prevention actions include making staff members visible in high-risk areas, using closed-circuit television cameras to identify people in inappropriate places or behaving abnormally (e.g., lingering in a place that people normally spend little time in), and installing awnings and soft-looking landscaping, which deters suicide attempts by making the place look ineffective.

Another factor in reducing jumping deaths is to avoid suggesting in news articles, signs, or other communication that a high-risk place is a common, appropriate, or effective place for dying by jumping from. The efficacy of signage is uncertain, and may depend on whether the wording is simple and appropriate.

== Terminology ==
In the United States, jumper is a term used by the police and media organizations for a person who plans to fall or jump (or already has fallen or jumped) from a potentially deadly height, sometimes with the intention to die by suicide, at other times to escape conditions inside (e.g. a burning building). It includes all those who jump, regardless of motivation or consequences. That is, it includes people making sincere suicide attempts, those making parasuicidal gestures, people BASE jumping from a building illegally, and those attempting to escape conditions that they perceive as posing greater risk than would the fall from a jump, and it applies whether or not the fall is fatal.

The term was brought to prominence in the aftermath of the September 11 attacks, in which two hijacked airliners―American Airlines Flight 11 and United Airlines Flight 175―were deliberately crashed into the Twin Towers of the World Trade Center, trapping hundreds in the upper floors of both buildings and setting the impacted floors ablaze. As a direct consequence, more than 200 people plummeted to their deaths from the burning skyscrapers, primarily from the North Tower with only 3 spotted from the South. Most of these people―especially those in the North Tower―deliberately made the decision to die by jumping as a quicker alternative to burning alive or dying from smoke inhalation; however, a small percentage of these deaths were not jumpers but people who accidentally fell. Many of these victims were inadvertently captured on both television and amateur footage, even though television networks reporting on the tragedy attempted to avoid showing people falling to avoid further traumatizing viewers. Despite the widespread public use of the term in connection to these deaths, the Office of Chief Medical Examiner of the City of New York refrained from officially classifying them as "jumpers;" spokesperson Ellen Borakove limited the term's use to "somebody who goes to the office in the morning knowing that they will commit suicide," whereas "these people were forced out by the smoke and flames or blown out." The medical examiner's office instead universally classified all deaths associated with the attacks as homicide.

== See also ==
- The Bridge (2006), documentary film about jumpers on the Golden Gate Bridge
- The Falling Man, iconic photograph of one of the hundreds of casualties of 9/11 victims who fell or jumped from the burning World Trade Center
- "The View from Halfway Down", episode of American animated drama BoJack Horseman
- Lover's Leap, nickname for many scenic heights with the risk of a fatal fall and the possibility of a deliberate jump
- Suicide barrier, access-control fence erected at certain high places to deter jumpers
- Suicide bridge, particular bridges favored by jumpers
- Category:Suicides by jumping
