= Voluntariness =

Decisions made with one's free will

In law and philosophy, voluntariness is a choice being made of a person's free will, as opposed to being made as the result of coercion or duress. Philosophies such as libertarianism and voluntaryism, as well as many legal systems, hold that a contract must be voluntarily agreed to by a party in order to be binding on that party. The social contract rests on the concept of the voluntary consent of the governed.

The Federal Rules of Criminal Procedure provide that "Before accepting a plea of guilty or nolo contendere, the court must address the defendant personally in open court and determine that the plea is voluntary and did not result from force, threats, or promises (other than promises in a plea agreement)." The actual voluntariness is suspect, in that it is common for prosecutors to threaten to seek more prison time unless the defendant agrees to plead guilty. For this reason, common law courts historically took a negative view of guilty pleas.
