= Reid technique =

Method of interrogation using psychological manipulation

The Reid technique is a method of interrogation after investigation and behavior analysis. The system was developed in the United States by John E. Reid in the 1950s. Reid was a polygraph expert and former Chicago police officer. The technique is known for creating a high-pressure environment for the interviewee, followed by sympathy and offers of understanding and help, but only if a confession is forthcoming. Since its spread in the 1970s, it has been widely used by police departments in the United States.

Proponents of the Reid technique say it is useful in extracting information from otherwise unwilling suspects. Critics say the technique results in an unacceptably high rate of false confessions, especially from juveniles and people with mental impairments. Criticism has also been leveled in the opposite case—that against strong-willed interviewees, the technique causes them to stop talking and give no information whatsoever, rather than elicit lies that can be checked against for the guilty or exonerating details for the innocent.

== Background ==
In 1931, the Wickersham Commission report, "Lawlessness in Law Enforcement", showed that violent forms of interrogation (known as the "third degree" after investigation and interview) were widespread but actually reduced crime-solving by causing false confessions. Involuntary alleged confessions had already been inadmissible in federal criminal trials since 1897 Bram v. United States. From 1936, interrogations causing obvious physical harm were ruled inadmissible by the US Supreme Court in Brown v. Mississippi.

A number of manuals were developed based on deception rather than assault, such as by W. R. Kidd in 1940, Clarence D. Lee in 1953 and Arther and Caputo in 1959. The most influential was from the writings of Fred E. Inbau from 1942, entitled Lie Detection and Criminal Interrogation. For the third edition in 1953, Inbau invited John Reid as co-author, for a new section on so-called lie detector techniques, such as the "control question".

Fred E. Inbau, a Northwestern University lawyer and criminologist, and John E. Reid, a law graduate who had worked in the Chicago Police Department, published other manuals together. Inbau had worked at the Scientific Crime Detection Laboratory (SCDL), which was set up in 1929 to better combat crime after the St. Valentine's Day Massacre. Inbau became SCDL's director after it was sold by Northwestern to the Chicago police in 1938, and he trained police officers and prosecutors. Both Leonard Keeler, inventor of polygraph technology, and John Reid set up polygraph training clinics in Chicago after working at the SCDL.

In 1955 in Lincoln, Nebraska, John E. Reid had gained a confession from Darrel Parker for the rape and murder of Parker's wife, Nancy. This case established Reid's reputation and popularized his technique. Parker recanted his confession the next day, but it was admitted to evidence at his trial. He was convicted by a jury and sentenced to life in prison. He was later determined to be innocent, after another man confessed and was found to have been the perpetrator. Parker sued the state for wrongful conviction; it paid him $500,000 in compensation.

In spite of Parker's false confession, Reid co-authored a text explaining his interrogation techniques. The first edition of the "Reid Manual" (Criminal Interrogation and Confessions) in 1962, was severely criticized by the US Supreme Court. Its famous Miranda v. Arizona warnings were made in large part in response to the psychological subjugation and risks of the Reid techniques. Inbau and Reid gained public notice, due also to appearing in a 1964 inquiry into the federal government's use of "lie detectors".

A second edition of the manual, in 1967, incorporated advice on how to use Miranda warnings. A third edition, in 1986, marked the start of what has been called "the new Reid method".

Reid died in 1982, and Joseph Buckley became president of John E. Reid & Associates, Inc. By 2013, according to The New Yorker, the company trained "more interrogators than any other company in the world" and Reid's technique had been adopted by law enforcement agencies of many different types, with it being especially influential in North America.

== Process ==
The Reid technique consists of a three-phase process beginning with fact analysis, followed by the behavior analysis interview (a non-accusatory interview designed to develop investigative and behavioral information) followed, when appropriate, by the Reid nine steps of interrogation. According to process guidelines, individuals should be interrogated only when the information developed from the interview and investigation indicate that the subject is involved in the commission of the crime.

In the Reid technique, interrogation is an accusatory process, in which the investigator tells the suspect that the results of the investigation clearly indicate that they did commit the crime in question. The interrogation is in the form of a monologue presented by the investigator rather than a question and answer format. The demeanor of the investigator during the course of an interrogation is ideally understanding, patient, and non-demeaning. The Reid technique user's goal is to make the suspect gradually more comfortable with telling the truth. This is accomplished by the investigator's first imagining and then offering the suspect various psychological constructs as justification for their behavior.

For example, an admission of guilt might be prompted by the question, "Did you plan this out or did it just happen on the spur of the moment?" This is called an alternative question, which is based on an implicit assumption of guilt. Critics regard this strategy as hazardous, arguing that it is subject to confirmation bias (likely to reinforce inaccurate beliefs or assumptions) and may lead to prematurely narrowing an investigation.

=== Nine steps of interrogation ===
The Reid technique's nine steps of interrogation are:

1. Positive confrontation. Advise the suspect that the evidence has led the police to the individual as a suspect. Offer the person an early opportunity to explain why the offense took place.
2. Try to shift the blame away from the suspect to some other person or set of circumstances that prompted the suspect to commit the crime. That is, develop themes containing reasons that will psychologically justify or excuse the crime. Themes may be developed or changed to find one to which the accused is most responsive.
3. Try to minimize the frequency of suspect denials.
4. At this point, the accused will often give a reason why they did not or could not commit the crime. Try to use this to move towards the acknowledgement of what they did.
5. Reinforce sincerity to ensure that the suspect is receptive.
6. The suspect will become quieter and listen. Move the theme of the discussion toward offering alternatives. If the suspect cries at this point, infer guilt.
7. Pose the "alternative question", giving two choices for what happened; one more socially acceptable than the other. The suspect is expected to choose the easier option but whichever alternative the suspect chooses, guilt is admitted. There is always a third option which is to maintain that they did not commit the crime.
8. Lead the suspect to repeat the admission of guilt in front of witnesses and develop corroborating information to establish the validity of the confession.
9. Document the suspect's admission or confession and have him or her prepare a recorded statement (audio, video or written).

== Validity ==
Critics claim the technique too easily produces false confessions, especially with juveniles and with people whose communication/language abilities are affected by mental disabilities, including reduced intellectual capacity. The thrust of this criticism is that the technique might be "effective" in producing confessions, but not actually accurate at getting only truthful confessions; instead it may sweep up people pushed to their mental limits by stress. Critics also dislike how police often apply the technique on subjects of unclear guilt, when simply gathering more information in non-stressful interrogations can be more useful both for convicting guilty suspects and exonerating innocent suspects.

Of 311 people exonerated through post-conviction DNA testing, more than a quarter had given false confessions—including those convicted in such notorious cases as the Central Park Five.

Some of the more minor details Reid propounded have been questioned. For example, Reid believed that "tells" such as fidgeting were a sign of lying, and more generally believed that trained police interrogators could intuitively check lies merely by how they were delivered. Later studies have shown no useful correlation between any sort of body movements such as breaking eye contact or fidgeting and truth-telling. While police can be effective at cracking lies, it is via gathering contradicting evidence; police officers have been shown in studies to be no better than average people at detecting lies merely from their delivery.

Several European countries prohibit some interrogation techniques that are allowed in the United States, such as a law enforcement officer lying to a suspect about evidence, due to the perceived risk of false confessions and wrongful convictions that might result, particularly with juveniles. For example, §136a of the German Strafprozessordnung (StPO, "code of criminal procedure") bans the use of deception and intimidation in interrogations; the Reid method also conflicts with the German police's obligation to adequately inform the suspect of their right to silence.

In Canada, provincial court judge Mike Dinkel ruled in 2012 that "stripped to its bare essentials, the Reid technique is a guilt-presumptive, confrontational, psychologically manipulative procedure whose purpose is to extract a confession".

In December 2013, an unredacted copy of a secret FBI interrogation manual was discovered in the Library of Congress, available for public view. The manual confirmed American Civil Liberties Union concerns that FBI agents used the Reid technique in interrogations.

Abuses of interrogation methods include officers treating accused suspects aggressively and telling them lies about the amount of evidence proving their guilt. Such exaggerated claims of evidence, such as video or genetics, have the potential, when combined with such coercive tactics as threats of harm or promises of leniency, to cause innocent suspects to become psychologically overwhelmed.

In 2015, eight organizations, including John E. Reid & Associates, settled with Juan Rivera, who was wrongfully convicted of the 1992 rape and murder of 11-year-old Holly Staker. A number of pieces of evidence excluded Rivera, including DNA from the Physical Evidence Recovery Kit (PERK) and the report from the electronic ankle monitor he was wearing at the time, as he awaited trial for a non-violent burglary, but he falsely confessed to the Staker crimes after being interrogated by the police several days after taking two polygraph examinations at Reid & Associates. After his exoneration, Rivera filed a suit for false arrest and malicious prosecution. The case was settled out of court with John E. Reid & Associates paying $2 million.

=== Alternative models ===
The Preparation and Planning, Engage and Explain, Account, Closure and Evaluate (PEACE) model developed in Britain "encourages more of a dialogue between investigator and suspect". In 2015, the Royal Canadian Mounted Police adopted a new standard influenced by the PEACE model. Sergeant Darren Carr, who trains police with the new approach, described it as "less Kojak and more Dr. Phil". This approach eschews the use of deceptive information to overwhelm suspects. It emphasizes information gathering over eliciting confessions and discourages investigators from presuming a suspect's guilt.

== See also ==
- Loaded question
- PEACE method of interrogation
- Suggestive question
