= Northwestern University Pritzker School of Law alumni =

Following is a list of notable alumni of the Northwestern University Pritzker School of Law.

== Academia ==
- Diane Marie Amann, chair in International Law and faculty co-director of the Dean Rusk International Law Center at the University of Georgia School of Law
- Raoul Berger, senior fellow in American Legal History at Harvard University
- George Burditt, adjunct member of the faculty
- G. Marcus Cole, professor of law and associate dean for curriculum at Stanford Law School
- Steven Drizin, lawyer and law professor at the Northwestern University Pritzker School of Law
- Thomas F. Geraghty, associate dean for clinical education, professor of law, and director of the Bluhm Legal Clinic at the Northwestern University School of Law
- Kristin E. Hickman, Distinguished McKnight University Professor and the Harlan Albert Rogers Professor in Law at the University of Minnesota Law School
- Charles P. Kindregan, Jr., professor at Suffolk University Law School
- James Nabrit Jr., president of Howard University and pioneering civil rights law academic and attorney
- Kate A. Shaw, law professor at University of Pennsylvania Law School and ABC News Supreme Court contributor
- Jonathan Turley, Maurice C. Shapiro Professor of Public Interest Law at George Washington University Law School

== Advocacy and nonprofits ==
- Albert Goldman (J.D. 1925), socialist lawyer and political activist, personal lawyer of Leon Trotsky during his stay in Mexico City
- Florence Kelley (1894), social reformer, early advocate for the minimum wage, eight-hour workdays, and children's rights; first general secretary of the National Consumers League; helped to create the National Association for the Advancement of Colored People (NAACP)
- Ada Kepley, advocate for women's suffrage and temperance, first American woman to obtain a law degree

== Business ==
- Matt Ferguson, president and CEO of Careerbuilder.com
- Elbert Henry Gary, co-founder, president, and chairman of United States Steel Corporation; namesake of Gary, Indiana
- Michael Goodkin, quantitative finance entrepreneur and founder of Arbitrage Management Company
- Randy Kaplan, founder of Akamai Technologies
- Marc J. Lane, founder of The Marc J. Lane Wealth Group
- Morgan E. O'Brien, co-founder and former chairman of Nextel
- Jay A. Pritzker, co-founder of Hyatt Hotels Corporation and member of the Pritzker family.
- Frank C. Rathje, founder of the Mutual National Bank of Chicago and president of the American Bankers Association
- Howard A. Tullman, serial entrepreneur, venture capitalist

== Entertainment ==
- Jerry Springer, former mayor of Cincinnati, television talk show host

== Government ==
- Richard E. Wiley, former Chairman of the Federal Communications Commission

== Judiciary ==
- Simeon R. Acoba, Jr., Hawaii Supreme Court Justice
- Mary Bartelme, influential pioneer in juvenile justice, the first woman elected judge in Illinois
- Dalveer Bhandari, Judge at the International Court of Justice, 2012–present
- Michael B. Brennan, United States Court of Appeals for the Seventh Circuit Judge
- Rubén Castillo, Chief Judge of the United States District Court for the Northern District of Illinois
- Edmond E. Chang, U.S. District judge for United States District Court for the Northern District of Illinois
- Michael P. Drescher, associate justice of the Vermont Supreme Court since 2026
- Joel Flaum, United States Court of Appeals for the Seventh Circuit Judge
- Arthur Goldberg, former United States Supreme Court Justice, U.S. Secretary of Labor, and Ambassador to the United Nations
- Jim Jones, Chief Justice of the Idaho Supreme Court
- Carole Kamin, first woman to become president of a state bar in the United States; Cook County Circuit Court Judge
- Kenesaw Mountain Landis, first Commissioner of Major League Baseball and U.S. District Judge for the United States District Court for the Northern District of Illinois
- Roberto A. Lange, U.S. District Judge for the United States District Court for the District of South Dakota
- Joan Larsen, U.S. Circuit Judge for the United States Court of Appeals for the Sixth Circuit
- Joan Lefkow, U.S. District Judge for United States District Court for the Northern District of Illinois
- José Abad Santos, 5th Chief Justice of the Supreme Court of the Philippines
- Michael Y. Scudder, United States Court of Appeals for the Seventh Circuit Judge
- Nathaniel C. Sears, judge of the Illinois Appellate Court and Cook County Superior Court; 1897 Republican nominee for mayor of Chicago
- John Paul Stevens, United States Supreme Court Justice
- Suhas Subramanyam, Member of the United States House of Representatives
- Richard Tallman, United States Court of Appeals for the Ninth Circuit Senior Judge
- Horace Ward, challenged racial discrimination at the University of Georgia and judge of the United States District Court for the Northern District of Georgia

== Law ==
- Ferdinand L. Barnett, Civil Rights activist and first African-American Assistant State's Attorney in Illinois, husband of Ida B. Wells
- Richard Ben-Veniste, chief of the Watergate Special Prosecutor's Office Watergate Task Force
- Salem Chalabi, first General Director of the Iraqi Special Tribunal to try Saddam Hussein
- Richard A. Devine, Cook County Former State's Attorney
- W. Neil Eggleston, White House Counsel under President Barack Obama
- T. Markus Funk, law professor and attorney at Perkins Coie
- Tappan Gregory, president of the American Bar Association in 1947–48
- Graham T. Perry, second African-American elected for assistant attorney general for the State of Illinois
- Kyle Roche, cryptocurrency attorney
- Richard Terrin, legal advisor to Governor-General of the Philippines, Dwight F. Davis
- Lloyd Garrison Wheeler, first African American admitted to the bar in Illinois

== Literature and journalism ==
- Ferdinand Lee Barnett, founder of The Chicago Conservator
- Robert R. McCormick, publisher of the Chicago Tribune and co-founder of law firm Stuart G. Shepard and Robert R. McCormick (later Kirkland & Ellis)
- Edward Moore, longtime chief music critic for the Chicago Tribune

== Politics ==
- George Wildman Ball (1933), former U.S. Undersecretary of State and U.S. Ambassador to the United Nations
- Judy Biggert (J.D. 1963), U.S. House of Representatives
- William Jennings Bryan, former U.S. Secretary of State and three-time Democratic nominee for President
- Dale Bumpers, former Governor of Arkansas and U.S. Senator
- Alfred Cilella, Illinois state legislator
- Dennis Daugaard, Governor of South Dakota
- William Dawson, first African American to chair a Congressional Committee, beginning in 1949
- Edward Dunne, former Governor of Illinois and former Mayor of Chicago
- Carl R. Feld, Wisconsin State Assembly
- Robert Todd Lincoln (1866), U.S. Minister to the United Kingdom (1889–1893); 35th United States Secretary of War (1881–1885)
- Wendy E. Long, Republican nominee for United States Senate from New York in 2012 and 2016
- Sara Love, Maryland Senate
- Frank Orren Lowden, Governor of Illinois
- J. Curtis McKay, Wisconsin State Assembly
- Albert E. Mead, former governor of Washington
- Newton Minow, former Chairman of the Federal Communications Commission
- Dawn Clark Netsch, first woman to be elected to a statewide constitutional office in Illinois
- Cecil A. Partee, former City Treasurer of Chicago, Cook County State's Attorney, and president of the Illinois Senate
- J. B. Pritzker, Managing Partner of Pritzker Group Venture Capital, and current Governor of Illinois
- Pat Quinn, former Governor of Illinois
- Tom Railsback, U.S. House of Representatives
- Henry T. Rainey, 40th Speaker of the U.S. House of Representatives
- Jerry Springer, former mayor of Cincinnati and television talk show host
- Seymour Stedman, Socialist Party of America nominee for vice-president of the United States (and for Mayor of Chicago)
- Halvor Steenerson, former U.S. Representative
- Adlai Stevenson, former Governor of Illinois, two-time Democratic Nominee for President, and Ambassador to the United Nations
- Jim Thompson, former Governor of Illinois
- Charles M. Thomson, former U.S. House of Representatives
- Daniel Walker, former Governor of Illinois
- Harold Washington, first black mayor of Chicago and U.S. House of Representatives
- Paul Ziffren, Democratic National Committee chair

== Sports ==
- Eddie Einhorn, owner of the Chicago White Sox
- Kenesaw Mountain Landis, first Commissioner of Major League Baseball, for U.S. District Judge for the United States District Court for the Northern District of Illinois
- Jerry Reinsdorf, owner of the Chicago White Sox and Chicago Bulls
- Mark Walter, founder and CEO of Guggenheim Partners and Chairman of Los Angeles Dodgers
