= Charles L. Sprung =

American-born Israeli physician and attorney

- Born: 1949 (age 76–77); Brooklyn, New York, U.S.
- Citizenship: American-born Israeli
- Occupations: Physician, attorney
- Known for: Coordinating EU-funded multicenter ICU studies (CORTICUS, ETHICUS, ETHICATT, ELDICUS); initiating and contributing to international recommendations and guidelines
- Awards: ESICM Medal (2011); Roger C. Bone Award (2013); Bonei Zion Prize (2015)

Academic background
- Education: Yeshiva University (B.A.); SUNY Downstate Medical Center (M.D.); University of Miami School of Law (J.D.)

Charles L. Sprung (born 1949) is an American-born Israeli physician and attorney known for his research in critical care medicine, medical ethics, and end-of-life decision-making. He holds both an MD and a JD, and coordinated several major European Commission (EU)-funded multicenter studies in intensive care medicine including CORTICUS, ETHICUS, ETHICATT, and ELDICUS.

== Education ==
Sprung earned a B.A. from Yeshiva University (1971), an M.D. from SUNY Downstate Medical Center (1974), and a J.D. from the University of Miami School of Law (1988). He trained in Internal Medicine and completed a fellowship in Emergency and Critical Care Medicine at Kings County Medical Center, Brooklyn (1974–1978).

== Hospital and clinical leadership ==
A 2005 clinical review he co-authored in Critical Care documented 93 multiple-casualty terror attacks in Israel over four years, 33 in Jerusalem, with 541 victims admitted to Hadassah's emergency department and 208 hospitalized, and described the “forward deployment” and command-chain systems his unit developed to manage mass-casualty admissions. In a 2014 Haaretz profile, Sprung described the commitment to treating perpetrators of terror alongside their victims as “one of those things that cannot be changed.”

== Research ==
=== Sepsis ===
Sprung was a member of the original ACCP/SCCM consensus conference on definitions of sepsis in 1991. He has participated in numerous sepsis studies as principal investigator, investigator, and member of steering committees, clinical evaluation committees, and data and safety monitoring committees for many phase III multicenter sepsis trials, spanning septic encephalopathy and treatments including corticosteroids, monoclonal antibodies to endotoxin and tumor necrosis factor, interleukin-1 receptor antagonist, antithrombin III, tissue factor pathway inhibitor, human activated protein C, and recombinant platelet-activating factor. He was an original advisory board member of the Surviving Sepsis Campaign and continued working on it and writing its guideline manuscripts for 18 years, credited with developing the concept of systematically reviewing the literature and publishing consensus recommendations. This body of work grew out of an earlier effort: the International Sepsis Forum's supplement to Intensive Care Medicine — Sprung CL, Bernard GR, Dellinger RP (Editors), “Guidelines for the management of severe sepsis and septic shock,” Intensive Care Medicine 2001;27 Suppl 1:S1-S134 — an evidence-based set of practical recommendations for managing severe sepsis and septic shock that predated the Surviving Sepsis Campaign's first publication.

=== Corticosteroids in septic shock ===
Sprung's 1984 NEJM study established the effects of high-dose corticosteroids in septic shock, followed by a 1988 NEJM VA cooperative study on which he served on the executive committee. This line of work culminated in CORTICUS (2008, NEJM), a multicenter, randomized, double-blind, placebo-controlled trial funded by the European Commission's Fifth Framework Programme (2000–2006), which he coordinated across 52 ICUs randomizing 499 patients with septic shock to hydrocortisone or placebo. Unlike the earlier Annane trial, CORTICUS found no overall survival benefit from hydrocortisone regardless of a patient's response to corticotropin stimulation testing, though the drug did produce a faster reversal of shock.

=== End-of-life decision-making ===
Sprung coordinated and chaired the steering committee of Ethicus-1 (European Commission BIOMED II grant, 1998–2001; data collection 1999–2000, published 2003 in JAMA), the first large-scale prospective study of European end-of-life ICU practices. Conducted across 37 ICUs in 17 European countries, it documented wide variation in practice, with rates of withholding life-prolonging therapy ranging from 16% to 70% of study patients across participating ICUs, withdrawing such therapy from 5% to 69%, and failed CPR from 5% to 48%. He went on to coordinate two further European Commission Fifth Framework Programme studies: Ethicatt (2000–2003), on general ethical principles in European ICU end-of-life decisions, and Eldicus (2002–2006), on ICU triage decision-making with special attention to elderly patients.

Ethicus-2 (2013–present) restudied 22 of the original European ICUs roughly 16 years later and, published in JAMA in 2019, found that treatment-limitation decisions had become significantly more common and death without any limitation of therapy significantly less common than in the original cohort. Ethicus-2 also extended to a worldwide arm, studying end-of-life decision-making in 199 ICUs across 36 countries.

=== ICU triage ===
Sprung's triage research began with a 1999 evaluation of triage decisions for intensive care admission at Hadassah, and continued with two Israeli Ministry of Health studies he helped initiate — a prevalence study and a subsequent incidence study — which found that ICU patients had better early survival relative to patients treated in regular wards, and that only about half of patients meeting SCCM ICU admission criteria were actually hospitalized in ICUs rather than general wards.

The Eldicus project (2002–2006) designed a standardized triage instrument for ICU admission decisions, evaluating mortality and costs across 8,472 triage decisions involving 6,796 patients in eleven ICUs across seven European countries. It was the first study to collect scoring data before ICU entry rather than after, making it possible to estimate a patient's probability of survival prior to an admission decision. The study found that elderly patients were more often rejected for ICU admission despite showing a greater survival benefit from admission than younger patients, and calculated the cost-effectiveness of intensive care (roughly $103,771 per life saved and $7,065 per life-year gained) as comparable to other funded medical therapies.

Sprung led international triage frameworks for epidemics and mass-casualty events, including the ESICM's 2010 recommendations for ICU and hospital preparation during influenza epidemics or mass disasters, developed as Chairman of its Task Force for Pandemics and Mass Disasters. At the start of the COVID-19 pandemic in March 2020, he organized international triage experts to rapidly develop new ICU triage criteria, published in Critical Care Medicine two months later, prioritizing patients by performance status, ASA score, organ failure count, and predicted survival. A modified version of this algorithm was adopted as Israel's national COVID-19 triage policy.^{[2]} As a member of the American College of Chest Physicians' Task Force for Mass Critical Care since 2012, he contributed to its 2014 consensus statements on triage and ethical considerations during pandemics and disasters, and led its 2023 consensus report on sustaining the critical care workforce during crisis-level staffing shortages.

== Contributions to clinical recommendations and guidelines ==
As Chairman of the Society of Critical Care Medicine's Ethics Committee, Sprung initiated and directed the first consensus statements on foregoing life-sustaining treatments in the critically ill and on triage of critically ill patients. He has since coordinated or participated in consensus conferences, recommendations, and guidelines across the United States, Europe, and worldwide, including on forgoing life-sustaining treatment, inadvisable treatment, sepsis, triage, pulmonary artery catheterization, corticosteroid insufficiency, colloid therapy, critical care during pandemics and disasters, end-of-life care, organ donation, hospital preparation for epidemics, and family-centered care. He contributed to five editions of the Surviving Sepsis Campaign guidelines (2004–2021), chairing its metabolic working group in 2012 and 2016; the 2012 edition alone has been cited more than 14,000 times, the 2016 edition more than 11,000. He co-authored the Society of Critical Care Medicine's 2026 guidelines for the allocation of critical care resources to adults during crisis-level shortages.

Separately, on scoring systems: Sprung co-authored the SOFA and Multiple Organ Dysfunction Score papers.

== Editorial work ==
Editor, Intensive Care Medicine (1995–2002); Advisory Board (2003–2023). Editorial boards: Critical Care Medicine (1987–1995, 2000–2017), Journal of Critical Care (1997–2024), Critical Care (1998–2026). Section Head for Ethics and Organization, Faculty of 1000 Medicine (2006–2009).

== Awards and honors ==
- ESICM Annual Congress poster award, for CORTICUS, Berlin, 2007
- ESICM Medal, 2011, for outstanding contribution to both ESICM and to the development of Intensive Care Medicine
- Roger C. Bone Advances in End-of-Life Care Award, CHEST Foundation, 2013; Roger C. Bone Memorial Lecture, 2015
- Bonei Zion Prize for Science and Medicine, 2015
- Immigrant Shield for Breakthrough in Medicine, Israeli Ministry of Immigration and Absorption, 2017
- Named a Critical Care Medicine Pioneer for the journal's 50th-anniversary retrospective, 2023
- Israel Society of Critical Care Medicine Founding Fathers Award, 2022
