= Michael Froomkin =

American legal scholar

- Froomkin in 2007
- Born: 1960 (age 65–66)
- Education: Yale University (BA); University of Cambridge (MPhil); Yale University (JD)
- Occupations: Professor, legal scholar at University of Miami School of Law
- Spouse: Caroline Bradley
- Website: law.tm discourse.net

A. Michael Froomkin is the Laurie Silvers & Mitchell Rubenstein Distinguished Professor of Law at the University of Miami in Coral Gables, Florida. His work on technology law since the mid-1990s spans Internet governance and regulation, privacy, encryption, AI and medicine, drones, and robotics. In 2012, he co-founded the annual We Robot conference with Ian Kerr and Ryan Calo in order to think ahead about the challenges to law and policy that widespread use of robots will bring. He blogs at Discourse.net

Froomkin is founder and editor of the online law review Jotwell, The Journal of Things We Like (Lots), created as a space where legal academics can go to identify, celebrate, and discuss the best new scholarship relevant to the law. He is a member of the advisory boards of several organizations including the Electronic Frontier Foundation and the Electronic Privacy Information Center.

== Life, education and career ==
Froomkin was born in 1960 in New York city to Joseph N. Froomkin (1927-2017), an economist originally from Harbin, China who settled in and Maya Pines Froomkin (1928-2024), an accomplished journalist and author on child development and brain research. He has a younger brother named Dan Froomkin. Froomkin attended Sidwell Friends School before earning his B.A. in 1982 from Yale University in Economics and History, summa cum laude, Phi Beta Kappa with Distinction in History. He has an M.Phil in History of International Relations from the University of Cambridge (1984), which he obtained while on a Mellon Fellowship. Froomkin received his J.D. from Yale Law School in 1987, where he served as Articles Editor of both The Yale Law Journal and The Yale Journal of International Law. He clerked for Judge Stephen F. Williams of the U.S. Court of Appeals, D.C. Circuit, and Chief Judge John F. Grady of the U.S. District Court, Northern District of Illinois, and went on to practice international arbitration law in the London office of Wilmer, Cutler & Pickering before entering teaching at the University of Miami School of Law in 1992.

Froomkin is a non-resident Fellow of the Yale Law School Information Society Project, a member of the Royal Institute of International Affairs in London (Chatham House), and a member of the University of Miami Center for Computational Science. In 2020 the University of Miami awarded him the Distinguished Faculty Scholar Award.

== Publications ==
- ——— (1995). "The Metaphor is the Key: Cryptography, the Clipper Chip and the Constitution". University of Pennsylvania Law Review. 143 (3): 709. SSRN 2719011. Archived from the original on October 8, 2014.
- ——— (1996). "Flood Control on the Information Ocean: Living With Anonymity, Digital Cash, and Distributed Databases". University of Pittsburgh Journal of Law and Commerce. 15: 395.
- ——— (2000). "Wrong Turn in Cyberspace: Using ICANN to Route Around the APA and the Constitution" (PDF). Duke Law Journal. 50: 17. doi:10.2307/1373113. hdl:10535/3464. ISSN 0012-7086. JSTOR 1373113. LCCN sf82007022. OCLC 1567016. SSRN 252523.
- ——— (January 16, 2003). "Habermas@discourse.net: Toward a Critical Theory of Cyberspace". Harvard Law Review. 116: 749. JSTOR 1342583. SSRN 363840.
- Caroline Bradley; ——— (2004). "Virtual Worlds, Real Rules". New York Law School Law Review. 49. SSRN 1127722. University of Miami Legal Studies Research Paper No. 2008-22, TPRC 2003
- ——— (2015). "Regulating Mass Surveillance as Privacy Pollution: Learning from Environmental Impact Statements". University of Illinois Law Review: 1713. SSRN 2400736.
- ——— (2017). "Lessons Learned Too Well: Anonymity in a Time of Surveillance". Ariz. L. Rev. 59: 95. SSRN 1930017.
- ——— (2019). "Big Data: Destroyer of Informed Consent" (PDF). Yale J. Health Pol. L. & Ethics. 18: 27. SSRN 3405482., jointly published in 21 Yale J.L. & Tech. 27 (special joint issue).
- ———; Ian Kerr; Joelle Pineau (2019). "When AIs Outperform Doctors: Confronting the Challenges of A Tort-Induced Over-Reliance On Machine Learning". Ariz. L. Rev. 61: 33. SSRN 3114347.
- ———; David B. Froomkin (2024). "Saving Democracy from the Senate". Utah Law Review. (forthcoming)
