= Kristin Hickman =

American legal scholar

- Education: Northwestern Law School
- Occupation: Professor of Law
- Employer: University of Minnesota Law School
- Notable work: Administrative Law Treatise
- Title: Distinguished McKnight University Professor, Harlan Albert Rogers Professor in Law
- Website: kristinhickman.com

Kristin Hickman is an American legal scholar known for her work in the fields of administrative law, tax administration, statutory interpretation, and tax law. She is a Distinguished McKnight University Professor and the Harlan Albert Rogers Professor in Law at the University of Minnesota Law School. Her work is regularly cited by United States Courts, including the United States Supreme Court. She is known for her scholarship on regulatory practice and judicial deference, particularly Chevron deference.

== Education ==
Hickman earned her J.D. at Northwestern Law School, where she graduated magna cum laude and was awarded the Raoul Berger Prize for outstanding Senior Research for Chevron's Domain. Hickman holds a B.A. from Trinity University in San Antonio.

== Career ==
Prior to law school, Hickman practiced as a Certified Public Accountant for almost 5 years. Based on this experience, she enrolled in law school with the idea of becoming a tax attorney.

After graduating law school, Hickman served as a law clerk to Judge David B. Sentelle on the United States Court of Appeals for the District of Columbia Circuit from 1999 to 2000. During this clerkship, "she began to notice difference between tax regulations and those of other federal agencies." Following her clerkship, she practiced law as an associate at Skadden, Arps, Slate, Meagher & Flom until 2003.

Hickman taught as a visiting assistant professor of law at Northwestern Law School from 2003 to 2004. In 2004, she became an associate professor of law at the University of Minnesota Law School. She received tenure in 2008 and was appointed full professor of law in 2011.

Hickman taught at Harvard Law School as the Donald C. Alexander Visiting Professor in Tax Law from 2012 to 2013.

Hickman served as special advisor to the administrator at the Office of Information and Regulatory Affairs from 2018 to 2019. She was credited with the Department of the Treasury curbing their use of "several of its regulatory tools" during her time at OIRA.

== Scholarship and citations ==
Hickman's scholarship has been published in highly regarded law journals, including Columbia Law Review, Virginia Law Review, and Georgetown Law Journal. According to HeinOnline, by 2020, her articles have been cited almost 1,500 times by courts and other scholars. In March 2020, she was ranked as the second most cited author in the field of Tax Administration and the third most cited in the field of Tax Law according to Google Scholar. A 2018 scholarly impact survey of tenured faculty at U.S. law schools cited her as one of the 4 most "highly-cited scholars who work partly in [tax]".

Her articles are regularly cited in United States Court decisions and have been directly referenced in several United States Supreme Court Decisions including United States v. Mead Corp and City of Arlington, Texas v. FCC. In its 2011 Mayo decision, the "U.S. Supreme Court accepted Hickman's interpretation of the Chevron standard of judicial review of agency regulations, ruling [...] Chevron, and more broadly the APA, should apply to tax regulations."

In 2015, Hickman became co-author of the Administrative Law Treatise with Richard J. Pierce Jr.

== Blogs and online publications ==
Hickman writes informal legal opinions on several online outlets including Twitter, her own OfInterest Blog, the Yale Journal on Regulation Notice and Comment Blog, TaxProf Blog, and Jotwell. Although these postings are more informal than her scholarly articles, many have attracted interest from other academics and lawyers including SCOTUSblog.

== Other affiliations ==
Hickman is a Public Member of the Administrative Conference of the United States. She is a member of the American College of Tax Counsel. She is a member of the Governing Council of the American Bar Association's Section of Administrative Law and Regulatory Practice.

== Selected publications ==
=== Books ===
- Hickman, Kristin E.; Pierce, Richard J. Jr. (2019). Federal Administrative Law: Cases and Materials (3rd ed.). St. Paul, MN.: West Academic. ISBN 978-1-64242-258-0. OCLC 1140123270.
- Hickman, Kristin E.; Pierce, Richard J. (2019). Administrative law treatise (6th ed.). New York: Wolters Kluwer. ISBN 978-1-5438-0137-8. OCLC 1053125104.

=== Articles ===
- Merrill, Thomas W.; Hickman, Kristin E. (2001). "Chevron's Domain" (pdf). Georgetown Law Journal. 89 (4): 833. SSRN 290181.
- — (2006). "The Need for Mead: Rejecting Tax Exceptionalism in Judicial Deference". Minnesota Law Review. 90: 1537. SSRN 883721.
- — (2006). "Of Lenity, Chevron, and KPMG" (pdf). Virginia Tax Review. 26: 905. SSRN 941233.
- Hickman, Kristin E.; Krueger, Matthew D. (2007). "In Search of the 'Modern' Skidmore Standard". Columbia Law Review. 108: 1235–1320. SSRN 997321.
- — (2007). "Coloring Outside the Lines: Examining Treasury's (Lack of) Compliance With Administrative Procedure Act Rulemaking Requirements". Notre Dame Law Review. 82. SSRN 955929.
- — (2008). "A Problem of Remedy: Responding to Treasury's (Lack of) Compliance with Administrative Procedure Act Rulemaking Requirements". George Washington Law Review. 76. SSRN 1124576.
- — (2013). "Unpacking the Force of Law". Vanderbilt Law Review. 66 (2). SSRN 2242134.
- — (2014). "Administering the Tax System We Have". Duke Law Journal. 63: 1717. SSRN 2409069.
- Nielson, Aaron; Knudsen, Sanne H.; Wildermuth, Amy J.; Bamzai, Aditya; Pierce, Richard J.; Barmore, Cynthia; Yeatman, William; Walker, Christopher J.; Stack, Kevin M.; Grewal, Andy; Johnson, Steve R.; Hessick, F. Andrew; Adler, Jonathan H.; Sharkey, Catherine M.; Feder, David; Sunstein, Cass R.; Vermeule, Adrian; Levin, Ronald M.; Leske, Kevin O.; Phillips, James Cleith; Ortner, Daniel; Metzger, Gillian E.; Funk, William; Hickman, Kristin E.; Pojanowski, Jeffrey A.; White, Adam; Clarke, Conor (2016). "Reflections on Seminole Rock: The Past, Present, and Future of Deference to Agency Regulatory Interpretations". Yale Journal of Regulation, Notice & Comment Blog. SSRN 2847668.
- Hickman, Kristin E.; Bednar, Nicholas (2017). "Chevron's Inevitability". George Washington Law Review. 85: 1392–1462. SSRN 3031055.
- Hickman, Kristin E.; Kerska, Gerald (2017). "Restoring the Lost Anti-Injunction Act". Virginia Law Review. 103: 1683. SSRN 3054177.
- — (2018). "Symbolism and Separation of Powers in Agency Design". Notre Dame Law Review. 93 (4). SSRN 3197252.
- Hickman, Kristin E.; Thomson, Mark (2019). "The Chevronization of Auer". Minnesota Law Review. 103: Headnotes. SSRN 3342467.
- Hickman, Kristin E.; Nielson, Aaron (2021). "Narrowing Chevron's Domain". Duke Law Journal. 70. SSRN 3546076.
