= Ravi Zacharias =

Canadian-American Christian apologist (1946–2020)

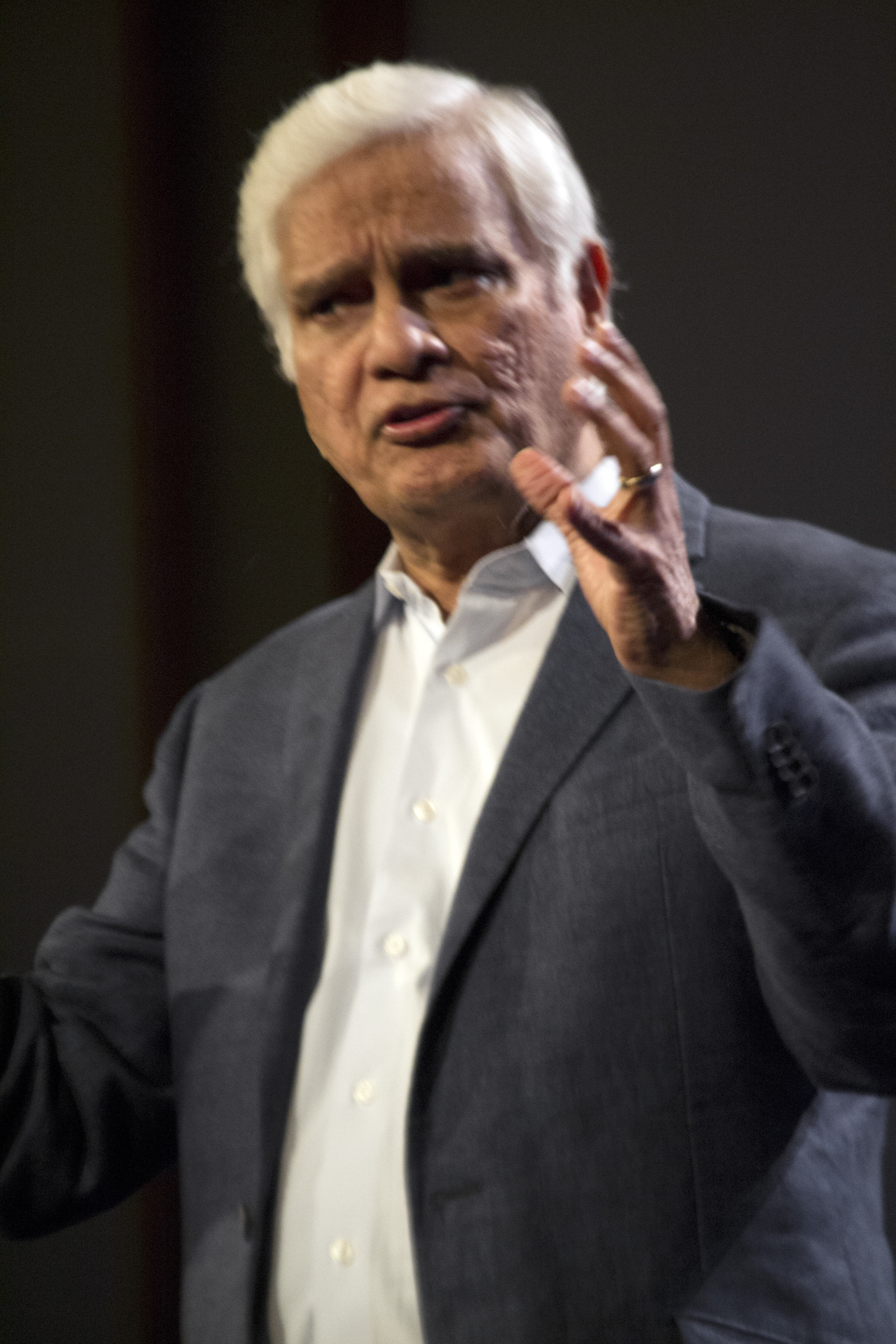
- Zacharias in 2015
- Born: Frederick Antony Ravi Kumar Zacharias; 26 March 1946; Madras, Madras Presidency, British India (now Chennai, Tamil Nadu, India)
- Died: 19 May 2020 (aged 74); Atlanta, Georgia, U.S.
- Citizenship: Canada; United States
- Occupations: Christian apologist, founder and chairman of the board of Ravi Zacharias International Ministries
- Spouse: Margaret Reynolds (m. 1972)
- Children: 3

Academic background
- Education: Tyndale University (BA); Trinity International University (MDiv)
- Influences: Norman Geisler, G. K. Chesterton, C. S. Lewis, Malcolm Muggeridge, John Polkinghorne, Billy Graham

Academic work
- Era: 21st-century philosophy
- School or tradition: Christian philosophy
- Main interests: Philosophy of religion, Christian apologetics, worldview
- Notable ideas: Four criteria for a coherent worldview
- Influenced: Nabeel Qureshi, Lee Strobel, Frank Turek, Tim Tebow, Alisa Childers
- Website: www.rzim.org www.rzimindia.in

Frederick Antony Ravi Kumar Zacharias (26 March 1946 – 19 May 2020) was an Indian-born Canadian and American evangelical minister and Christian apologist who founded Ravi Zacharias International Ministries (RZIM). He was involved in Christian apologetics for over 40 years, authoring more than 30 books. He also hosted the radio programs Let My People Think and Just Thinking. Zacharias belonged to the Christian and Missionary Alliance (C&MA), the Keswickian Christian denomination in which he was ordained as a minister.

Both before and after his death in May 2020, multiple women alleged that Zacharias had engaged in habitual sexual misconduct and/or abuse.

== Early life and education ==
Ravi Zacharias was born on 26 March 1946 in Madras, India into a Tamil family, and grew up in Delhi.

Zacharias' family was Anglican, but he was a "skeptic" until the age of 17 when he attempted suicide by swallowing poison. While he was in the hospital, a local Christian worker brought him a Bible and told his mother to read to him from John 14, which contains Jesus' words to Thomas the Apostle. Zacharias said it was John 14:19 that touched him as the defining paradigm, "Because I live, you also will live", and that he thought, "This may be my only hope: A new way of living. Life as defined by the Author of Life." Zacharias committed his life to Christ, praying that "Jesus if you are the one who gives life as it is meant to be, I want it. Please get me out of this hospital bed well, and I promise I will leave no stone unturned in my pursuit of truth."

In 1966, Zacharias emigrated with his family to Canada, earning his undergraduate degree from the Ontario Bible College in 1972 (now Tyndale University) and his M.Div. from Trinity International University in 1976. In 1990 he participated in guided study at Ridley Hall, a Church of England theological school in Cambridge, Cambridgeshire, England.

== Career ==
=== Ministry ===
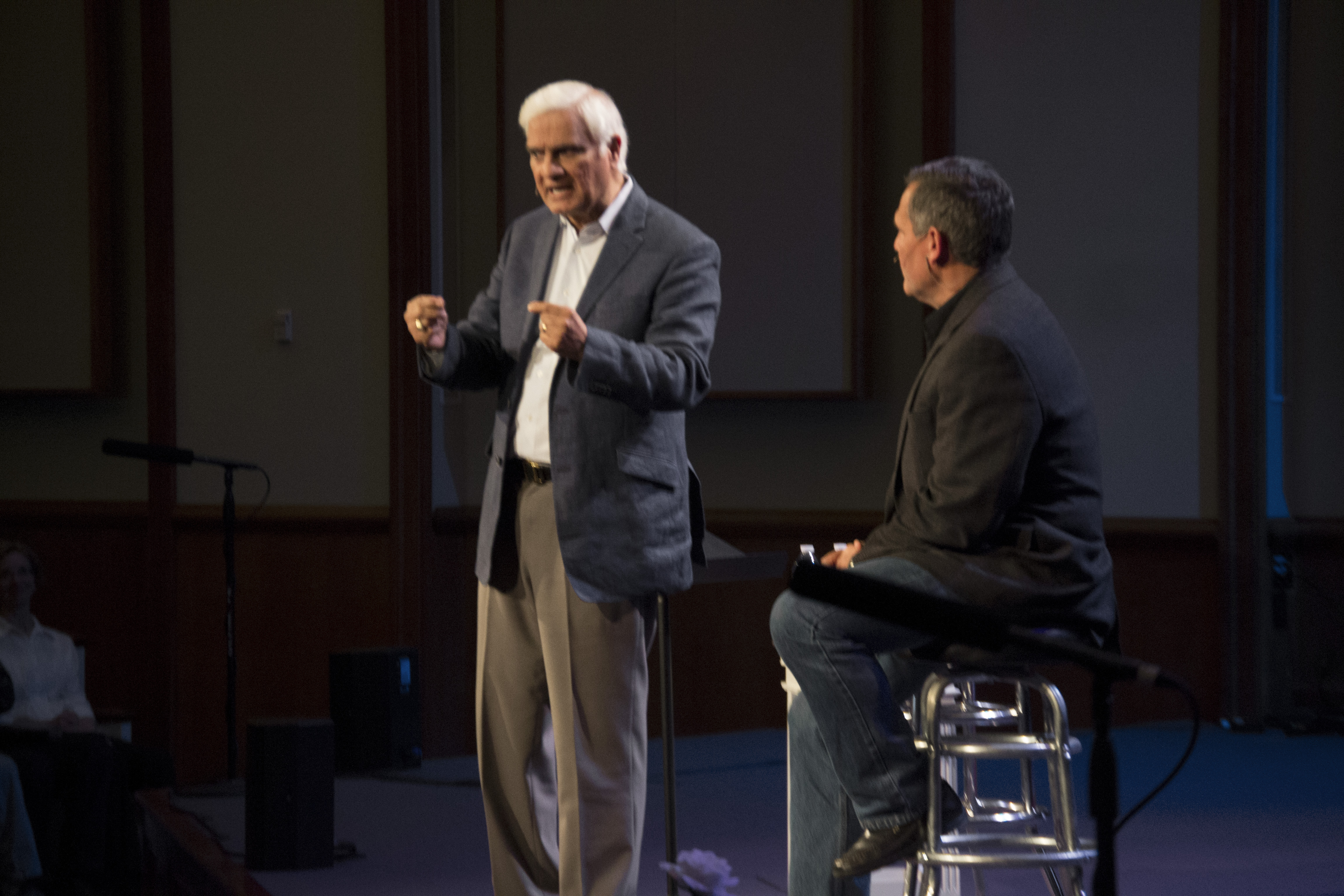
Zacharias talks to pastor Joe Coffey at Christ Community Chapel about answering objections to Christianity

Zacharias spent the summer of 1971 in South Vietnam, where he evangelized U.S. soldiers as well as imprisoned Viet Cong members. After graduating from Ontario Bible College, he began an itinerant ministry with the Christian and Missionary Alliance (C&MA) in Canada. In 1974 the C&MA sent him to Cambodia, where he preached only a short time before its fall to the Khmer Rouge. He was later ordained by the C&MA in 1980, and between 1980 and 1984 he taught at the C&MA-affiliated Alliance Theological Seminary, where he was a professor of evangelism.

In 1983, Zacharias spoke in Amsterdam at the Billy Graham Evangelistic Association's first International Conference for Itinerant Evangelists. After Amsterdam, he spent the summer evangelizing in India, where he continued to see the need for apologetic ministry, both to lead people to Christ and to train Christian leaders. In August 1984, Ravi Zacharias International Ministries (RZIM) was founded in Toronto, Ontario, Canada, to pursue his calling as a "classical evangelist in the arena of the intellectually resistant." Later its headquarters were located in the suburbs of Atlanta, Georgia, United States.

In 1989, shortly after the fall of the Berlin Wall, Zacharias spoke in Moscow with students at the Lenin Military-Political Academy as well as political leaders at the Center for Geopolitical Strategy. This was the first of many evangelism events in the political sphere. Future events included one in Bogotá, Colombia, in 1993, where he spoke to members of the judiciary on the importance of having a solid moral foundation.

The following year, Zacharias wrote his first book, A Shattered Visage: The Real Face of Atheism. In 1992, Zacharias spoke at his first Veritas Forum at Harvard University, and later that year was one of the keynote speakers at Urbana. He continued to be a frequent guest at these forums, both giving lectures and answering students in question-and-answer sessions at academic institutions including the University of Georgia, the University of Michigan, and Penn State.

In 2004, The Church of Jesus Christ of Latter-day Saints (LDS Church) opened its signature pulpit at the Salt Lake Tabernacle to Zacharias for a series of messages. He delivered a sermon on "Who Is the Truth? Defending Jesus Christ as The Way, The Truth and The Life" to some 7,000 lay-persons and scholars from both LDS and Protestant camps in an initiatory move towards open dialogue between the groups. Some evangelicals criticized Zacharias' decision not to use this opportunity to directly address the "deep and foundational" differences between the traditional Christian faith and the teachings of the LDS Church. He responded by asserting that Christians should not immediately condemn the LDS Church's theological differences but "graciously build one step at a time in communicating our faith with clarity and conviction", stating that this would be just as effective as showing someone the faults of their faith. The speaking engagement was nearly sabotaged by an allegation by event organizer Greg Johnson, president of Standing Together, that Zacharias had nothing to do with editing the book The Kingdom of the Cults and had only loaned his name to the latest edition; Johnson later apologized for his comment.

Zacharias was a frequent keynote lecturer within the evangelical community at events including the Future of Truth conference in 2004, the National Religious Broadcasters' Convention and Exposition in 2005, and the National Conference on Christian Apologetics in 2006. On successive nights in October 2007, he addressed first the students and faculty of Virginia Tech, then the community of Blacksburg, Virginia, on the topic of evil and suffering in the wake of the Virginia Tech massacre. Zacharias represented the evangelical community at occasions such as the National Day of Prayer in Washington, D.C., the Annual Prayer Breakfast at the United Nations, the African Union Prayer Breakfast in Maputo, Mozambique, and was named honorary chairman of the 2008 National Day of Prayer task force. He also participated in the ecumenical Together 2016 meetings, which Pope Francis addressed, describing the event as a valiant effort.

In 2006, Ravi Zacharias along with Wycliffe Hall established the Oxford Centre for Christian Apologetics (OCCA) in Oxfordshire, England though it is now entirely separate from Wycliffe.

In November 2009, Zacharias signed the ecumenical Manhattan Declaration which affirms the sanctity of human life, the dignity of marriage as a union of husband and wife, and freedom of religion as foundational principles of justice and the common good. In 2016, Republican presidential candidate Marco Rubio appointed Zacharias to his anti-abortion "Dignity of Life" advisory panel.

In 2015, according to RZIM's public Form 990 tax return, Zacharias and his wife earned a combined total of $523,926 from the ministry.

=== Worldview ===
Zacharias argued that a coherent worldview must be able to satisfactorily answer four questions: that of origin, meaning of life, morality, and destiny. He said that while every major religion makes exclusive claims about truth, the Christian faith is unique in its ability to answer all four of these questions. He routinely spoke on the coherence of the Christian worldview, saying that Christianity is capable of withstanding the toughest philosophical attacks. Zacharias believed that the apologist must argue from three levels: from logic to make it tenable; from feelings to make it liveable; and from whether one has the right to use it to make moral judgments. Zacharias' style of apologetics focused predominantly on Christianity's answers to life's great existential questions with defense of God. He argued that the dominance of the visual in modern communication systems has impacted people's capacity for abstract reasoning, altering their way of perceiving things; however, the integration of abstract reasoning into one's worldview is important to have its base grounded in absolutes rather than on relative feelings and fads.

== Academic credential controversies ==
In an earlier edition of his biography and in other literature, Zacharias claimed to have studied at the University of Cambridge and was a visiting professor at the University of Oxford. In multiple speaking engagements he said that he had taken a class in quantum mechanics under John Polkinghorne and while a visiting scholar at Cambridge had heard Stephen Hawking lecture, seeing him struggle between agnosticism and theism. Zacharias often claimed in books and sermons that he was invited to be a visiting scholar at Cambridge, where he focused his studies on Romantic writers and moralist philosophers.

The veracity of Zacharias's purported academic positions at the universities of Oxford and Cambridge was questioned by psychologist Warren Throckmorton. Throckmorton claimed that Zacharias "wasn't being truthful", pointing out that he had been a visiting scholar at Ridley Hall, though Ridley Hall does maintain ties with the Faculty of Divinity, University of Cambridge. Atheist commentator Steve Baughman also ran a website that claimed that Zacharias exaggerated his qualifications.

In 2017, Christianity Today reported accusations that Zacharias had exaggerated his academic credentials; for instance that he had referred to himself in multiple articles and videos with the title "Doctor" or "Dr." though he did not have a PhD qualification. In response, Zacharias said he had been conferred ten honorary doctorates and RZIM further argued that "in Ravi's homeland of India… honorific titles are customary and are used frequently out of respect for elders, including by the RZIM India team when addressing Ravi." In a statement, RZIM indicated that "[in] earlier years, 'Dr.' did appear before Ravi's name in some of our materials, including on our website, which is an appropriate and acceptable practice with honorary doctorates. However, because this practice can be contentious in certain circles, we no longer use it." Christianity Today reported that Zacharias' online biography was edited following the accusations regarding his credentials.

== Sexual abuse allegations ==
Public allegations of sexual misconduct by Zacharias first emerged in 2017. In the months following his death, multiple other alleged victims came forward, and RZIM hired the law firm Miller & Martin to investigate. Their report substantiated several of the allegations and showed how Zacharias had tried to conceal his behavior from RZIM employees and the public. The report's authors described their investigation of Zacharias's behavior as "not exhaustive," particularly in regards to his activities when traveling overseas, because they had already uncovered enough evidence to conclude that Zacharias had engaged in sexual misconduct. The revelations led to a civil action against RZIM, and to ongoing scrutiny of its management and culture.

Both before and after his death in May 2020, multiple women alleged that Zacharias had engaged in habitual sexual misconduct and/or abuse. Ruth Malhotra, a former member of RZIM, claims that suspicions regarding Zacharias' behavior had existed during his lifetime but that RZIM employees were not allowed to investigate.

=== Lori Anne Thompson's lawsuit ===
In April 2017, RZIM claimed that Canadians Lori Anne and Brad Thompson sent a demand letter to Zacharias requiring him to pay $5 million in exchange for them refraining from filing a lawsuit that would have accused him of impropriety. Their evidence included text exchanges, which included nude photos sent by Lori Anne Thompson to Zacharias. In response, Zacharias filed a lawsuit accusing the couple of extortion. The case was settled in November 2017 with a non-disclosure agreement. In a statement issued on 3 December 2017, Zacharias said, "Let me state categorically that I never met [Thompson] alone, publicly or privately. The question is not whether I solicited or sent any illicit photos or messages to [her]—I did not, and there is no evidence to the contrary—but rather, whether I should have been a willing participant in any extended communication with a woman, not my wife. The answer, I can unequivocally say, is no, and I fully accept responsibility." He added that he had been "absolutely faithful" to his wife throughout their marriage, but acknowledged that he "failed to exercise wise caution and to protect [himself] from even the appearance of impropriety".

=== 2020 abuse allegations and preliminary report ===
Four months after Zacharias died in 2020, three women who worked at two day spas he had co-owned in the Atlanta area came forward alleging that he had sexually harassed multiple massage therapists over the course of five years. According to Christianity Today, Zacharias masturbated in front of one of the women more than fifty times, requested explicit photos of them, and asked for sex on at least two occasions. Other women claimed that Zacharias had inappropriately groped or fondled them. A former business partner, Anurag Sharma, expressed regret at not stopping Zacharias and issued an apology to one of the alleged victims in the Christianity Today article.

RZIM initially denied the claims, but subsequently hired the law firm Miller & Martin to conduct an investigation. Miller & Martin engaged the services of a private investigation firm consisting of former federal law enforcement officers. The investigators interviewed more than fifty people, including more than a dozen massage therapists, and accessed data from four mobile devices used by Zacharias. On 23 December 2020, RZIM confirmed that the allegations were true and released a preliminary report from the investigation, which concluded:

"The interim investigation update indicates this assessment of Ravi's behavior to be true—that he did indeed engage in sexual misconduct. This misconduct is deeply troubling and wholly inconsistent with the man Ravi Zacharias presented both publicly and privately to so many over more than four decades of public ministry. We are heartbroken at learning this but feel it necessary to be transparent and to inform our staff, donors, and supporters at this time, even while the investigation continues."

=== Full report and subsequent allegations ===
On 11 February 2021, RZIM released the full results of its investigation, concluding that there was credible evidence that Zacharias had engaged in sexual misconduct. Accordingly, it was found that Zacharias solicited and received sexually explicit photos from more than 200 women who were in their early twenties until a few months before he died in 2020. According to investigators, Zacharias also used thousands of dollars of ministry funds which had been dedicated to a "humanitarian effort" to pay for massage therapists, providing them housing, schooling, and monthly support for extended periods of time.

In an article on the report, The Gospel Coalition noted that,

Some therapists describe Zacharias as setting the women at ease by asking probing questions about their background, including "financial struggles or emotionally broken backgrounds." For example, one therapist reported that Zacharias spent the first half of their first massage session asking about her spiritual journey and prior abuse. This set her at ease and made her feel that he cared for her as a person before he later asked her to massage his genitals. Another woman reported that he would talk about her career plans and efforts to improve her financial situation while he was massaging her breasts. She never came forward because she thought, "Who would believe me?" against a famous Christian leader. Some therapists also reported that Zacharias paid well or would leave large tips and gave gifts that were at times lavish, such as a Persian rug or a Louis Vuitton wallet with $500 inside.

Regarding Zacharias' financial irregularities, The Gospel Coalition further noted from the report that RZIM would pay rent for Zacharias to stay in his own apartment while in Bangkok. They wrote,

Zacharias often traveled alone to Bangkok and other parts of Southeast Asia for substantial time. He owned two apartments in Bangkok. Between 2010 and 2014 he spent a total of 256 days in one of these apartments and sought rent reimbursement from RZIM for those stays. The other apartment, in the same building but on a different floor, housed one of his massage therapists.

Christianity Today while reporting on the findings, wrote that,

One woman told the investigators that "after he arranged for the ministry to provide her with financial support, he required sex from her." She called it rape. She said Zacharias "made her pray with him to thank God for the 'opportunity' they both received" and, as with other victims, "called her his 'reward' for living a life of service to God," the report says. Zacharias warned the woman—a fellow believer—if she ever spoke out against him, she would be responsible for millions of souls lost when his reputation was damaged.

Vicki Blue maintains that Zacharias threatened to make her and her daughter, Becca (who was also abused), miserable if she disclosed abuse. She stated, "Ravi kept talking about an anonymous donor that he could get limitless money from," Blue said. "He said, 'I can keep it going and make your life miserable until you die.'" Blue said that initially, Zacharias helped her a great deal with her spiritual confusion, and she thought he was "the closest person to God other than Jesus." Later, Zacharias maintained that his marriage was unsatisfactory and that Blue was "his soulmate," and he "couldn't survive without (her)." Blue maintains Zacharias put his hand into her groin and continued sexual advances after she said, "no". Zacharias exposed himself and masturbated in front of her 50 to 100 times, he twice asked her to have sex but she refused. At the time, Blue believed Zacharias was in love with her. She claims she was confused and vulnerable, stating, "It's hard to explain. When someone gives you spiritual advice and you know everything he says about God is true, yet he's also doing these things to you—it took years of therapy to realize I didn't do anything wrong." Blue was persuaded to open a spa with Zacharias as a co-owner, and it failed financially. Blue maintains her daughter, Becca, said Zacharias molested her, and six other spa therapists also complained he had done something perverted or molested them. "I realized then how much I had been used and manipulated," Blue stated.

In an interview, Shirley Steward, a retired Ontario Provincial Police Officer, recounts that Ravi Zacharias, who was already a Christian minister at the time, pressured her to have an abortion after she became pregnant as a teenager by his brother Ramesh.

=== Repercussions ===
In their release of the full report, the board of RZIM stated that it was "shocked and grieved by Ravi's actions" and apologized to his victims: "Words cannot come close to expressing the sorrow that we feel for what you have been through or the gratitude we feel for the bravery with which you have responded." Carson Weitnauer, a former RZIM employee, referred to Zacharias as "one of [his generation's] greatest frauds," a "sexual predator", and a "uniquely charismatic manipulator."

On 12 February 2021, Zacharias Trust, the UK branch of RZIM, decided to change its name and cut ties to the parent ministry, criticizing their response to the scandal as inadequate. By 24 February, RZIM Africa had suspended its operations while RZIM itself scaled back its website. On 8 March, RZIM stated it would alter its name and remove all material related to Zacharias. As a result of falling donations, RZIM decided to make 60% of its workforce worldwide redundant and changed from running evangelists and apologists to making grants to other organizations, supporting evangelism and "the prevention of and caring for victims of sexual abuse." In addition, RZIM Canada began winding down operations.

On 12 February 2021, the IWU Society of World Changers Committee unanimously voted to remove Ravi Zacharias from the Society of World Changers.

On 19 February 2021, the Alliance World Fellowship revoked Zacharias' ordination after its own investigation confirmed a "pattern of predatory behaviour." HarperCollins Christian Publishing, which includes Zondervan and Thomas Nelson, confirmed that it would no longer sell books by Zacharias and that it was working with Christian author Lee Strobel to remove Zacharias from other works.

In early August 2021, the Brad Sohn Law Firm filed a lawsuit on behalf of several former RZIM donors, including NFL player Derek Carrier and his wife Dora, seeking the return of donations they had given to RZIM between 2004 and 9 February 2021. The plaintiffs asserted that they donated to RZIM, believing it was to finance spreading the Christian message, when in fact the money financed Zacharias' predatory behavior. The case was settled and dismissed in April 2023, after the district court granted RZIM's motion to strike the class in March 2023.

As of 2024, RZIM continues to operate. However, no financial information or grant application is posted on its website.

=== Family reaction ===
Zacharias’ wife, Margie has said, “He could never have kept a secret like they are alleging (alleging, I say, as there is not one whit of evidence to support what they are saying).

Zacharias’ son, Nathan maintains an entire blog website with dozens of entries going into extreme detail, not only on how the allegations are unfounded, but also how the process by which all investigations were conducted hastily with zero integrity.

One of Zacharias’ daughter, Naomi, also maintains her fathers innocence.

His other daughter, Sarah Davis, has apologized for her fathers actions, believing her father committed the abuse. Nathan states Sarah Davis “is not speaking for the family…we do not share her take on this situation.”

== Personal life ==
On 7 May 1972, Zacharias married Margaret "Margie" Reynolds, whom he had met at his church's youth group. They had three children. He lived in Atlanta, Georgia.

In March 2020, Zacharias announced that he had been diagnosed with sarcoma of the sacrum, and on 19 May 2020, he died of that cancer at his home in Atlanta at the age of 74. Following his death, many high-profile Christians posted messages online detailing Zacharias's influence upon them.

Then-White House press secretary Kayleigh McEnany and then-U.S. Vice President Mike Pence were among many who expressed their sympathies for Zacharias following his death.

== Bibliography ==
- A Shattered Visage: The Real Face of Atheism (1994, 2004) ISBN 0-8010-6511-9
- Can Man Live Without God? (1994, 1996) ISBN 0-8499-3943-7
- Deliver Us from Evil (1996, 1998) ISBN 0-8499-3950-X
- Cries of the Heart (1998, 2002) ISBN 0-8499-4387-6
- The Merchant and the Thief (1999; children's) ISBN 0-7814-3296-0
- The Broken Promise (2000; children's) ISBN 0-7814-3451-3
- Jesus Among Other Gods (2000, 2002) ISBN 0-8499-4327-2
- Jesus Among Other Gods (youth ed., 2000) ISBN 0-8499-4217-9
- The Lotus and the Cross: Jesus Talks with Buddha (2001) ISBN 1-57673-854-X
- Sense and Sensuality: Jesus Talks with Oscar Wilde (2002) ISBN 1-59052-014-9
- Light in the Shadow of Jihad: The Struggle For Truth (2002) ISBN 1-57673-989-9
- Recapture the Wonder (2003) ISBN 1-59145-276-7
- Is Your Church Ready?: Motivating Leaders to Live an Apologetic Life (2003) (Editor, with Norman Geisler) ISBN 0-310-25061-7
- Who Made God? And Answers to Over 100 Other Tough Questions of Faith (2003) (General editor, with Norman Geisler) ISBN 0-310-24710-1
- The Kingdom of the Cults (2003) (Editor) ISBN 0-7642-2821-8
- I, Isaac Take Thee, Rebekah: Moving From Romance to Lasting Love (2004) ISBN 0-8499-0822-1
- The Prince and the Prophet: Jesus Talks With Mohammed (copyright 2004, to be released posthumously) ISBN 1-59052-319-9
- The Lamb and the Führer: Jesus Talks with Hitler (2005) ISBN 1-59052-394-6
- Zacharias, Ravi; Sawyer, R. S. B. (2006), Walking From East to West: God in the Shadows (1st ed.), Grand Rapids, MI: Zondervan, ISBN 0-310-25915-0, 205 pp.
- The Grand Weaver: How God Shapes Us Through the Events of Our Lives (2007) ISBN 0-310-26952-0
- Beyond Opinion: Living the Faith We Defend (2008) ISBN 0-8499-1968-1
- The End of Reason: A Response to the New Atheists (2008) ISBN 0-310-28251-9
- Is There Not a Cause (2008; National Day of Prayer Feature Book) ISBN 978-1-93010721-2; Audio CD ISBN 978-1-61256016-8.
- New Birth or Rebirth: Jesus Talks with Krishna (2008) ISBN 1-59052-725-9
- There is a Plan (2009) (excerpts from The Grand Weaver) ISBN 0-310-31849-1
- Has Christianity Failed You? (2010) ISBN 0-310-26955-5
- The Lotus and the Cross: Jesus Talks with Buddha (2010) ISBN 1-60142-318-7
- Why Jesus? Rediscovering His Truth in an Age of Mass Marketed Spirituality (2012) ISBN 978-0-89296-319-5
- The Lamb and the Führer (graphic novel, 2014) ISBN 978-161328-137-6
- Why Suffering? Finding Meaning and Comfort When Life Doesn't Make Sense (2014) ISBN 978-1-45554-970-2
- with Vince Vitale, Jesus Among Secular Gods: The Countercultural Claims of Christ (2017) ISBN 978-1-45556915-1
- The Logic of God: 52 Christian Essentials for the Heart and Mind (2019) ISBN 978-0-310-45405-2
- with Abdu Murray, Seeing Jesus from The East: A Fresh Look at History's Most Influential Figure (2020) ISBN 978-0-310-53129-6
