= Marcus Cole =

Marcus Cole may refer to:

- Marcus Cole (Babylon 5), a fictional character
- Marcus Cole (musician), gospel singer
- Marcus Cole, hellogoodbye band member
- G. Marcus Cole, professor of law

== See also ==
- Mark Cole, member of the Virginia House of Delegates
- Cole (name)
