= Law Preview =

Law Preview is a member of The BARBRI Group - a legal education provider - and offers a 5- or 6-day law school prep course, designed to prepare entering law students for law school.

== Courses ==
The course introduces the six core law school courses that most students encounter in their first year - torts, civil procedure, contracts, property, criminal law and legal research and writing. Each day of the course is devoted to one first-year subject and prominent professors are brought in from law schools across the country, including Dan Kahan from Yale Law School and G Marcus Cole from Stanford Law School.

Law Preview offers scholarships for diverse students matriculating at select law schools.

== Locations ==
Law Preview offers live classroom programs in law schools across the United States: Atlanta, Austin, Texas, Boston, Chicago, Dayton, Dallas/Fort Worth, Houston, Los Angeles, New York City, Philadelphia, San Francisco and Washington, D.C. Several larger locations such as New York, Los Angeles and Washington D.C. offer several sessions each. Though the time frame changes slightly each year, the Law Preview courses generally run from late June to late August. To accommodate students who are unable to travel, Law Preview offers Live Stream and On-Demand online courses as well.

Law School Confidential by Robert H. Miller says, "Law Preview provides an excellent, long overdue product. Taking the one-week bootcamp cannot help but put you miles ahead of your uninitiated competition." The course has also appeared in The Law School Survival Guide by the editors of JD Jungle.

== Websites ==
The owners of Law Preview also own and operate BARBRI Bar Review, as well as AdmissionsDean.com, a social networking site for law school applicants that allows prospective applicants to track specific law schools (and specific applicants) to see who's getting into which schools so that they can better assess their own admissions chances. In 2018, Law Preview launched the Law Preview Job Network - a free employment website that connects law students with legal recruiters.

== See also ==
- Lyon & Lyon
- Miller & Martin
