= Malcolm X College =

City College in Chicago, US

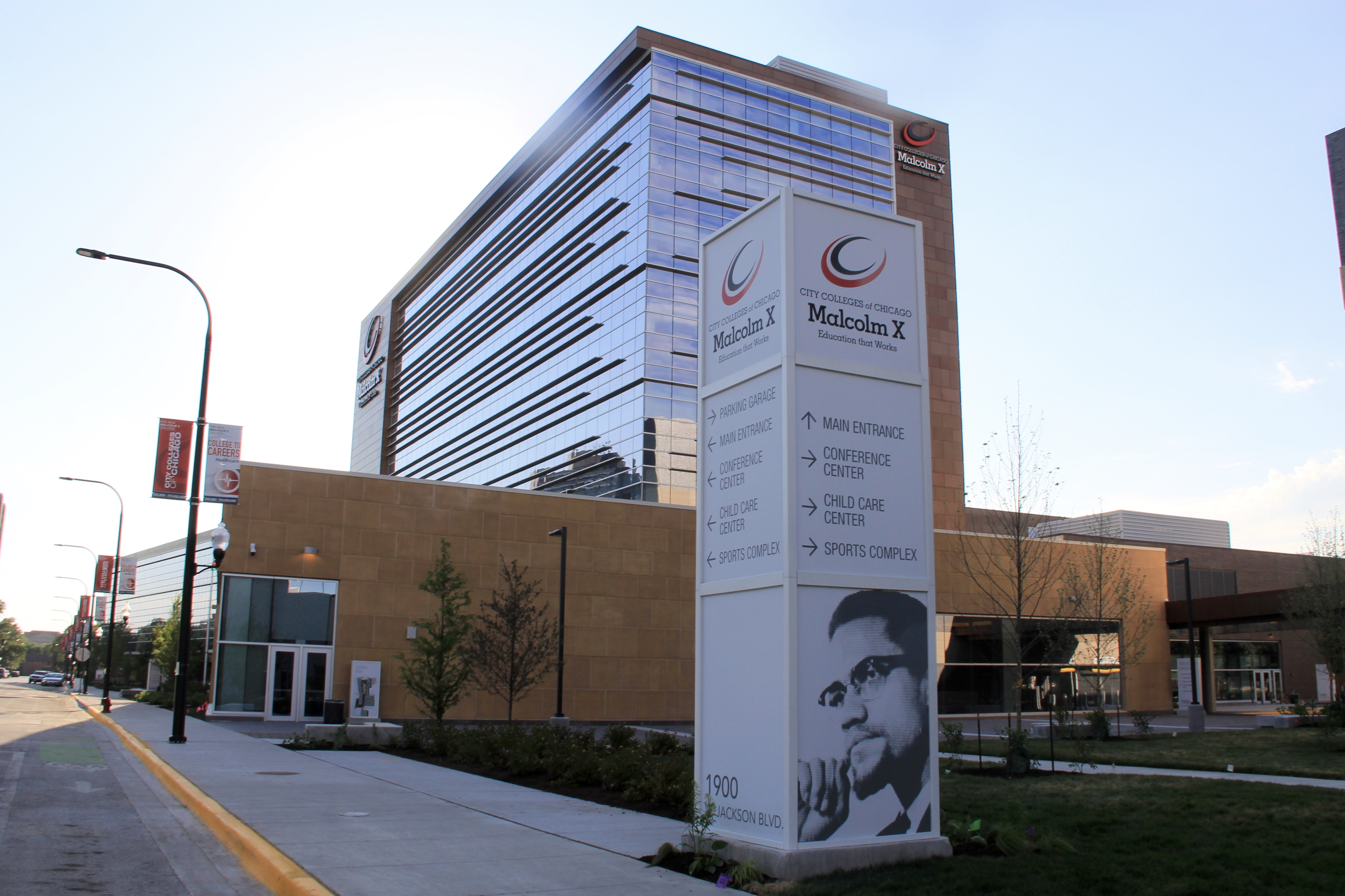
- Malcolm X College in June 2016
- Former names: Crane Junior College (1911–1934); Theodor Herzl Junior College (1934–1969)
- Motto: Education that Works
- Type: Community college
- Established: 1911; 115 years ago
- Affiliations: City Colleges of Chicago
- Chancellor: Juan Salgado
- President: David Sanders
- Location: Chicago, Illinois, U.S. 41°52′41″N 87°40′31″W
- Campus: Urban
- Mascot: Hawks
- Website: ccc.edu/malcolm-x

Malcolm X College is a public municipal community college in the Near West Side community area in the west side of Chicago, Illinois, United States. It is part of the City Colleges of Chicago system.

The college was founded as Crane Junior College in 1911 and was the first of the City Colleges. Crane ceased operation during the Depression; their newspaper, the Crane College Javelin, was still being printed in May of 1932. It was reopened in 1934 as Theodor Herzl Junior College, located in the North Lawndale neighborhood on Chicago's West Side in. Needing a new campus in the late 1960s, Herzl's building was changed into an elementary school. In 1969, the school was named in honor of civil rights advocate and orator Malcolm X on its move to a new campus in the Near West Side.

Malcolm X College works with healthcare and industry partners to provide students with career-oriented education in the healthcare field. The school's main corporate partner is Rush University Medical Center, which helps the school write curriculum, teach, and place students in jobs. The school also has 18 other healthcare and industry partners, including Walgreens and GE Healthcare.

== History ==
Crane Junior College, the first city college in Chicago, was founded in 1911 to be a junior college for the graduates of the nearby Crane High School. During the Great Depression, the financially strapped Chicago Board of Education considered closing the school but after arguments from Clarence Darrow, it remained open as the Theodor Herzl Junior College, named for the founder of the modern Zionism movement. During World War II, Herzl Junior College was leased by the United States Navy and used in training thousands of Navy personnel as a part of the Electronics Training Program.

In 1968, at the request of the local community, the school was renamed Malcolm X College and relocated to its present site at 1900 W. Jackson Blvd. The Douglas Blvd. site no longer serves as a college campus and is currently operated by the Chicago Public Schools as Theodor Herzl Elementary School. In 1971 a modernist inspired campus building based on Miesian design standards was built by architect Gene Summers at 1900 West Van Buren. Gene Summers was an assistant to the esteemed Mies Van Der Rohe and as such the former Malcolm X college campus had a look similar to the IIT campus designed by Rohe. The campus was demolished in 2016 to make way for a Chicago Blackhawk's training facility.

In 2016, the City of Chicago built a $251 million state-of-the-art facility and 1,500-space parking garage adjacent to the United Center, a facility to train students for careers in healthcare. The 500,000 square-foot campus would offer healthcare and general education courses, a virtual hospital, simulated healthcare technology, a dental hygiene clinic, smart technology in every classroom, a conference center, a daycare center and a 1,500-space parking garage. The campus also housed the new City Colleges of Chicago School of Nursing. The new facility was announced in 2012, completed in 2016, and opened on January 7, 2016.

== Academics ==
The college provides open admissions; all prospective students are admitted. Classes take place at both the main campus on Van Buren St. and at an auxiliary site, known as the West Side Learning Center, 4624 W. Madison St. Malcolm X College focuses on adult education and continuing education. The college offers a number of different degree choices, including associate degrees in arts, in general studies, in applied science, and in science. The associate in arts degree offers five different majors: business administration, English, history, psychology, and theater arts. The associate in general studies degree offers four different majors: communication and fine arts, biology, natural and behavioral sciences, and mathematics.

=== Beacon College for Health Science Education ===
Through its Beacon College for Health Science Education, Malcolm X College helps to meet the health care needs of the community. In that capacity, Malcolm X College offers the largest selection of health science career degrees and certificate programs in Cook County. Located adjacent to one of the nation's largest medical centers, the Beacon College offers students clinical affiliations.

== Sports ==
Malcolm X has both men's and women's collegiate sports. The college has both men's and women's basketball and cross country teams as well as a men's soccer team and a women's volleyball team. There is also intramural teams for men and women in basketball and weight lifting.

== Notable alumni ==
- Herbert C. Brown, recipient of 1979 Nobel Prize in Chemistry
- Burne Hogarth, artist, illustrator of Tarzan, teacher, and author
- Johnny Burke, lyricist, writer of popular songs in America between the 1920s and 1950s
- Alfred Cilella, Illinois politician
- Marvin R. Dee, Illinois politician, lawyer, and businessman
- Douglas Huff, Illinois politician
- Nathan J. Kaplan, Illinois jurist and politician
- Don Myrick, musician with The Pharaohs, Earth, Wind & Fire
- Bernard S. Neistein, Illinois state legislator and lawyer
- Louis Satterfield, musician with The Pharaohs, Earth, Wind & Fire

== See also ==
- Bibliography of Malcolm X
- Bibliography of Martin Luther King Jr.
