= Nell Jessup Newton =

American lawyer

10th Dean of the Notre Dame Law School
- In office July 1, 2009 – July 1, 2019
- Preceded by: Patricia A. O'Hara
- Succeeded by: G. Marcus Cole

Personal details
- Born: St. Louis, Missouri, U.S.
- Education: University of California, Berkeley (BA); University of California, Hastings College of the Law (JD)

Nell Jessup Newton is an American legal scholar who has held deanships at six law schools, a record in U.S. legal education.

Throughout her career, Newton has served as dean at the University of Denver Sturm College of Law, University of Connecticut School of Law, University of California College of the Law, San Francisco (formerly Hastings College of Law), and Notre Dame Law School. She was interim dean at the University of Miami School of Law for the 2021-22 academic year, and at Wake Forest University School of Law for the 2022-23 academic year.

She returned to Notre Dame as a professor of law for the 2023-24 academic year and transitioned to emerita status at the end of the spring 2024 semester.

Her academic focus is on federal law relating to Native Americans.

== Early life and education ==
Newton was born in St. Louis, Missouri. Newton and her two brothers lived with her mother or grandparents in rural Michigan and later in St. Louis County, Missouri. She graduated from Brentwood High School in 1962, where she was named a National Merit Scholar.

After attending George Washington University, she earned her bachelor of arts in an interdisciplinary humanities major with a focus on the ancient Greek language at the University of California, Berkeley in 1973. In 1976, she earned her J.D. from the University of California, Hastings College of the Law, where she was a member of the Order of the Coif and the Thurston Society and managing editor of the Hastings Law Journal.

== Career ==
After Newton graduated from Hastings College of Law in 1976, Newton began her academic career at Catholic University of America's Columbus School of Law in Washington, D.C., where she became the first woman to be tenured and promoted to full professor. While at Catholic University, she worked other female law professors who were then teaching in Washington, D.C. to form the D.C. Women Law Professors Group, which eventually became the D.C./Maryland/Virginia/West Virginia/Western Pennsylvania Women Law Professors Group. In 1992, she joined the faculty at Washington College of Law at American University.

In 1998, she was named the first woman dean of the University of Denver Sturm College of Law. In 2000, she accepted the deanship at the University of Connecticut School of Law, serving again as the first woman dean. At Connecticut, she raised the school's profile as a resource for local Indian tribes and state government. While in Connecticut, she was also nominated as a James W. Cooper Fellow of the Connecticut Bar Foundation, where she remains a Life Fellow. She also served on the Board of Overseers for the Bushnell Performing Arts Center from 2003 until 2006 and the Board of the Connecticut Opera from 2004 until 2006. In October 200,6 she received the Distinguished Service Award from the University of Connecticut Law School Alumni Association for her service as dean.

In 2006, she returned to Hastings College of Law as chancellor, dean, and William B. Lockhart Professor of Law. During that time, she was also appointed by the Yurok Tribe to serve as an associate justice of the Yurok Tribal Court. After three years at UC Hastings, she stepped down to become the Joseph A. Matson Dean and Professor of Law at Notre Dame Law School. After ten years, Newton returned to the Notre Dame Law faculty.

In 2021, the University of Miami School of Law called upon Newton to serve as interim dean after Miami’s former law dean Anthony Varona was ousted from the position. One year later, in 2022, Wake Forest University School of Law invited Newton to serve as interim dean after former dean Jane Aiken stepped down.

Newton stated that their focus during interim deanships is solving problems and assisting law schools during transitional periods. Newton also noted that because each law school varies, advising dean search committees to help identify candidate matches is part of the role.

Newton has been active in legal education organizations, serving on the ABA Section of Legal Education and Admission to the Bar's Clinical and Skills Committee (2005–09) and on numerous committees for the Association of American Law Schools (AALS). She has chaired four AALS committees, including the Committee on Sections and the Annual Meeting (2009–10), the Executive Committee of the Law Dean's Section (2008), the Executive Committee of the Native American Rights Section (1997–98), and the Executive Committee of the Women in Legal Education Section (1996). She has also served on various committees for the Law School Admission Council. She was a member of the Board of Trustees for the NALP Foundation for Law Career Research and Education from 2006 to 2018 and served as chair from 2014 to 2016.

=== Scholarship ===
Newton's scholarship focuses on American Indian law with an emphasis on tribal property and federal constitutional issues. She has published a number of articles on the legal issues affecting American Indian tribes and co-authored a textbook on the subject. Her law review articles have been reprinted in collections on race law, the law of reparations, and the philosophy of law. Since 1998, Newton has served as editor-in-chief of Cohen's Handbook of Federal Indian Law, the only comprehensive academic treatise on Federal Indian law. The original treatise was prepared under the direction of Felix S. Cohen in 1942, which is known as "the bible" of Indian law.

== Recognition ==
In 2014, the Pokagon Band of Potawatomi Indians recognized Newton for her work on The Handbook of Federal Indian Law. In 2019, the State of Indiana awarded Newton the Sagamore of the Wabash, the state's highest honor, which is "given as a personal tribute to those who have rendered a distinguished service to the state or the governor."

Newton was selected by the Association of American Law Schools in 2019 to contribute to the AALS Women in Legal Education Oral History Project. She participated in a video interview with Notre Dame Law Professor Emerita Margaret Brinig.

== Selected publications ==
Book and book contributions

- Cohen's Handbook of Federal Indian Law (Nell Jessup Newton, ed.) 2005, 2012 (LexisNexis)
- Robert N. Clinton, Nell Jessup Newton, Monroe E. Price, American Indian Law: Cases and Materials, 3rd edn (Michie Press, 1991)

Journal articles

- Nell Jessup Newton, Tribal Court Praxis: One Year in the Life of Twenty Tribal Courts, 22 Am. Ind. L. Rev. 285 (1998)
- Nell Jessup Newton (1984). "Federal power over Indians: Its sources, scope, and limitations". University of Pennsylvania Law Review. 132 (2): 195–288. doi:10.2307/3311816. JSTOR 3311816. S2CID 152307788.
