= LawWithoutWalls =

- Formation: 2010 Miami, Florida, United States
- Type: Education
- Purpose: Law, Business, Innovation
- Headquarters: Miami, United States
- Region served: Worldwide
- Website: LawWithoutWalls

LawWithoutWalls (LWOW) is an educational model founded by Professor Michele DeStefano in 2010 and sponsored by The University of Miami School of Law. It is a cooperative partnership among more than 30 law and business schools in 15 countries and a mix of lawyers, business professionals, entrepreneurs, and venture capitalists from companies around the world.

LawWithoutWalls is a part-virtual collaboratory which is designed to enable students, academics, and professionals to connect over issues facing the legal profession, solve legal problems, and develop the skills students need to compete in a global marketplace.

== Methodology ==
After a selection process, students from participating schools are teamed up with law and business practitioners, entrepreneurs, and academics to identify a real challenge at the intersection of law, business and technology, with the goal to create a viable solution that solves that problem. The original LawWithoutWalls collaborative journey was a four month Sprint. Teams met in January at a KickOff, an in-person event designed to enhance team building and self-awareness skills. After the KickOff, from January to April, LawWithoutWalls participants attended weekly Virtual Thought Leader Sessions. A virtual "classroom" wherein experts in law, entrepreneurialism, and business share their multidisciplinary viewpoints on challenges in legal education and practice and teach professional, business, financial, and entrepreneurial skills. These Virtual Sessions were conducted through Adobe Connect, and some of the earlier versions of today's virtual meeting platforms. Additionally, during this same time period, teams continue to meet virtually to "hack" on their solution, only meeting again in-person in April, where teams tested the viability of bringing their ideas to market by presenting their solution and business plans to a multidisciplinary panel of judges including venture capitalists, such as True Ventures and Tennessee Community Ventures Fund.

Today, the LawWithoutWalls Sprint is a 3-day legal hackathon where up to 16 teams collaborate to identify a narrow problem and target audience, create the foundation to a viable solution, and then pitch to the LawWithoutWalls community. Sprint teams continue to be diverse, multidisciplinary, intergenerational and cross-cultural. Teams are sponsored by corporate legal departments, law firms and law-related companies that want to improve collaboration and problem-solving among professionals within the organization and with clients, and develop solutions to specific challenges.

== Participating schools ==
Participating schools vary each year. They include Bifröst University, Bucerius Law School, Harvard Law School, Graduate Institute of International and Development Studies, IE Business School, IE Law School, Indiana University Maurer School of Law, Maastricht University, National Law School of India University, New York Law School, Osgoode Hall Law School, York University, Peking University School of Transnational Law, Pontifical Catholic University of Chile, Stanford Law School, Tel Aviv University Buchmann Faculty of Law, UCL Faculty of Laws, University of Miami School of Law, Université de Montréal Faculty of Law, Faculdade de Direito da Universidade de São Paulo, University of St. Gallen Law School, Sydney Law School, and Wharton School of the University of Pennsylvania.
