= Bernard S. Neistein =

American lawyer and politician

Bernard S. Neistein (August 15, 1916 – October 3, 2003) was an American lawyer and politician.

Neistein was born in Chicago, Illinois. He went to the Chicago public schools. He went to Crane College, DePaul Commerce School, and DePaul University College of Law. Neistein was admitted to the Illinois bar and practiced law in Chicago. He served in the United States Army during World War II and was commissioned a lieutenant. Neistein served in the Illinois House of Representatives from 1957 to 1959 and in the Illinois Senate from 1959 to 1973. He was a Democrat. Neistein died at Northwestern memorial Hospital in Chicago, Illinois. He was Jewish.
