= Dan Froomkin =

American journalist

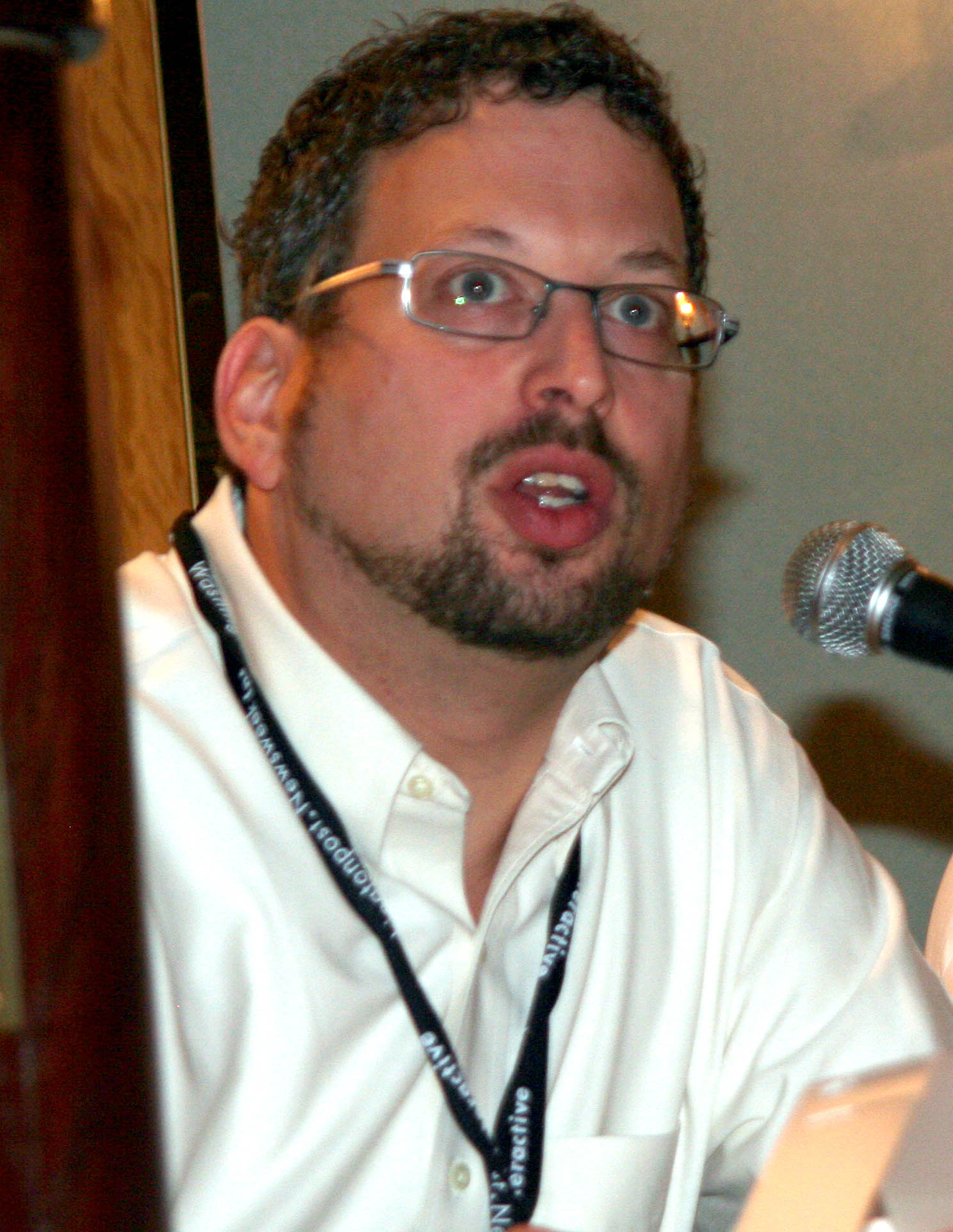

Dan Froomkin is the editor of Press Watch, an independent website previously known as White House Watch. He is a former senior writer and Washington editor for The Intercept. Prior to that, he was a writer and editor for The Huffington Post.

== Personal history and career ==
Froomkin was raised in Washington, D.C. His parents were Maya Pines Froomkin, an author and journalist, and Joseph Froomkin, an economist. In 1985, Froomkin graduated from Yale University. His brother is University of Miami law professor Michael Froomkin, a prominent blogger who writes on Florida politics and the law.

He has worked at newspapers such as The Winston-Salem Journal, The Miami Herald, and the Orange County Register. He was a Michigan Journalism Fellow and editor of new media for Education Week. In 1997, he joined washingtonpost.com, the relatively new online website of the Post, as a senior producer for politics. From 2001 to 2003, he was editor of washingtonpost.com. His column devoted to presidential accountability launched on January 12, 2004.

From 2004 to 2009, he wrote a highly successful column for the online version of The Washington Post entitled, White House Watch, and he was the senior Washington correspondent for The Huffington Post. On June 18, 2009, it was reported that his blog and employment at The Washington Post were terminated. In July, 2009, he was hired by The Huffington Post.

Froomkin subsequently worked as the Washington bureau chief for The Intercept, from September, 2014 until May, 2017. In September 2018, Froomkin revived White House Watch as an independent website.

== Publications ==
=== From White House Briefing to White House Watch ===
In her editorial, "The Two Washington Posts", published on December 11, 2005, Washington Post Ombudsman Deborah Howell observes that the print newspaper The Washington Post and the website washingtonpost.com are two different entities; although "The Post Web site is owned by the Washington Post Co... it is not run by the newspaper. It is a separate company called Washington Post-Newsweek Interactive, or WPNI, with offices in Arlington." Whereas "The Post provides the vast majority of the Web site's content... the Web site has its own staff of 65 editorial employees and its own features... [Moreover,] [t]here are cultural differences between the two newsrooms, which could be expected between a traditional newspaper and the more free-wheeling Web site... The two Posts interact every day... [but] political reporters at The Post don't like WPNI columnist Dan Froomkin's "White House Briefing", which is highly opinionated and liberal. They're afraid that some readers think that Froomkin is a Post White House reporter."

Howell continued:

John Harris, national political editor at the print Post, said, "The title invites confusion. It dilutes our only asset—our credibility" as objective news reporters. Froomkin writes the kind of column "that we would never allow a White House reporter to write. I wish it could be done with a different title and display."

Harris is right; some readers do think Froomkin is a White House reporter. But Froomkin works only for the Web site and is very popular—and [Executive Editor of the website Jim] Brady is not going to fool with that, though he is considering changing the column title and supplementing it with a conservative blogger.

Froomkin said he is "happy to consider other ways to telegraph to people that I'm not a Post White House reporter. I do think that what I'm doing, namely scrutinizing the White House's every move—with an attitude—is in the best traditions of American and Washington Post journalism."

On the other hand, Chris Cillizza, a washingtonpost.com political reporter, appears in The Post frequently. When he writes for the paper, he works for Harris, who is happy to have him.

There was some support from readers for Froomkin in editorial correspondence about the matter.

On January 30, 2007, White House Briefing was renamed White House Watch.

=== Nieman Watchdog: Questions the press should ask ===
Froomkin was also the deputy editor of Nieman Watchdog: Questions the press should ask, a blog hosted by the Nieman Foundation for Journalism at Harvard University that "seeks to encourage more informed reporting by soliciting probing questions from experts".

=== Firing from The Washington Post ===
On June 18, 2009, it was reported that Froomkin was being fired by The Washington Post. Froomkin confirmed this in a June 19 entry on White House Watch: "As Washington Post ombudsman Andy Alexander and others reported yesterday, The Washington Post has terminated my contract. So sometime in late June or early July, I'll be writing my last blog post here."

Almost immediately, Froomkin was hired by The Huffington Post, where he continued to write and edit. His last original column for that publication was September 25, 2013.

He joined The Intercept on September 4, 2014. On May 9, 2017, The Intercept announced he was leaving. The Intercept's editor praised Froomkin upon his leaving, writing: "Dan was integral to The Intercept from the start, building up a scrappy and smart bureau from scratch and infusing our independent voice on politics with his skepticism, wisdom, and wit. Dan never wavered in his fierce commitment to the Intercept's core mission of producing original accountability journalism.

=== Revival of White House Watch ===
In September 2018, Froomkin revived White House Watch as an independent website.

=== Presswatchers ===
On June 8, 2022, in her assertion that many do not understand that an "existential fight for rule of law" is at stake in the hearings of the Select Committee on the January 6 attack on the Capitol, Heather Cox Richardson noted that in his publication, Presswatchers, Froomkin had "explored how U.S. news organizations have failed to communicate to readers that we are on a knife edge between democracy and authoritarianism", and noted his plea for journalists to "frame the events in the larger context of Republican attempts to overturn our democracy".

On August 26, 2022 Press Watch published an article in its newsletter, Presswatchers, and online, by Froomkin in the same vein, exploring how media again are failing to communicate to their readers effectively regarding dangers evident in the policies, actions, and campaigning messages of the governor of Florida, Ron DeSantis, that emulate and exceed those used by Trump to move the country into authoritarianism and toward fascism. He conjectures that the media are failing to exercise their appropriate role in a democracy by reporting in a "neutral" style in order to appear "fair" by attempting to "balance" coverage, using euphemisms that fail to convey how dangerous what should be reported is, and even allowing the politician to dictate terms of engagement that are unprecedented in professional reporting, such as banning access to reporters who report things the candidate dislikes or limiting access only to those agreeing to allow critical review of what the media intends to produce before publication or broadcast. He asserts that DeSantis is "gaming" political journalists just as Trump had, which leads to a "normalizing" of dangerous actions and trends that should be reported as being dangerous and, that this should be reported consistently in order to keep readers from becoming complacent rather than increasingly concerned.

Froomkin labels this failure as "journalistic malpractice" and that it may be found even in highly respected media such as the Wall Street Journal, the New York Times, and others, as well as, among national broadcast media. He describes many examples and contrasts that with the frank reporting of media such as the Cleveland Plain Dealer. He makes many recommendations to the media and reminds them that their very existence may become the casualty of their own role in a "normalization" effect. In that vein, on October 13, 2023 Froomkin addressed announced layoffs at the Washington Post as the result of their having adopted the "balanced" reporting model instead of its former role of telling the truth that should be resurrected regarding the increasing contemporary threats leading toward authoritarianism. He suggested that returning to the historical role of the Post when it pursued Watergate could reverse the decline in readership and make it become a responsible leader among media now reluctant to champion such a cause.

On November 7, 2023, Press Watch published an article pointing to the same failure seen in coverage by the New York Times and the Washington Post of Trump and his allies discussing authoritarian planning for a "second administration". The article provided suggested headlines and text that he believes would fulfill responsibility to report recent events covered accurately to readers better than that published.

On November 9, 2023, Press Watch provided a full transcript of the proceedings in court on November 6, the day of the testimony by Trump at his civil fraud trial in Manhattan, that was offered freely after being acquired by Froomkin using publicly-funded gofundme contributions. His stated objective was to enable the public to know exactly what transpired because media coverage of the day-long testimony was limited and subject to reporting perspectives.
