= Douglas Huff =

American politician

- Born: January 8, 1931; Chicago, Illinois, US
- Died: September 23, 1988 (aged 57)
- Education: Malcolm X College, Roosevelt University
- Spouse: Valencia Brown

Douglas Huff Jr. (January 8, 1931 - September 23, 1988) was an American politician in Illinois.

Born in Chicago, Illinois, Huff served in the United States Army. He went to Malcolm X College and Roosevelt University. Huffman was the executive director of East Garfield Organization. From 1975 to 1988, Huff served in the Illinois House of Representatives and was a Democrat. In 1988, he resigned from the Illinois General Assembly after being convicted in the United States District Court for income tax evasion and was sentenced to four years in prison on September 9, 1988. Huff died at St, Mary of Nazareth Medical Center in Chicago, Illinois after suffering a stroke.
