= Irwin Stotzky =

Irwin P. Stotzky is professor of law at the University of Miami School of Law. He is the founder and served as the Director for many years of the University of Miami Center for the Study of Human Rights.

He received his Ph.D. from the University of Chicago Law School in 1974.

For over 40 years he has represented Haitian and other refugees on constitutional and human rights issues.

== Awards ==
- Human rights awards from the American Immigration Lawyers Association and the Haitian Refugee Center
- 1997: Lawyer of the Americas Award

== Books ==
- The Theory and Craft of American Law: Elements (with Soia Mentschikoff) (1981)
- Transition to Democracy in Latin America: The Role of the Judiciary (1993)
- Silencing the Guns in Haiti: The Promise of Deliberative Democracy (1997) (Note: Explores Stotzky's experiences in Haiti.)
- Law as Justice: The Moral Imperative of Owen Fiss’s Scholarship (2009)
- Send Them Back (2019) (Note: Documents Stotzky's experiences with refugees' cases, including litigation regarding President George H.W. Bush's 1989 decision to send back all refugees who had been stopped at sea by the U.S. Coast Guard without giving them an interview on their claims.)
- Jean v. Nelson: A Civil Rights Revolution in Immigration (2021)

== Personal life ==
Stotzky is married to Audrey Goldman, J.D. '83, and they have twin sons, Jacob and Joshua. According to a 2020 profile by the University of Miami, he had been a vegetarian for 40 years.
