= Marvin R. Dee =

American lawyer, businessman, and politician

Marvin Robert Dee (August 21, 1917 – January 3, 1977) was an American lawyer, businessman, and politician.

Dee was born in Chicago, Illinois. He went to the Chicago public schools and to Crane College. Bee received his bachelor's and law degrees from DePaul University. Dee practiced law in Chicago and was involved in the construction and real estate businesses. Dee served in the United States Coast Guard Reserve. Dee was involved in the Republican Party. In 1973, Dee was appointed to the Illinois House of Representatives succeeding Peter C. Granata who died while still in office. Dee served until 1975. Dee died in Chicago, Illinois.
