= Richard J. Pierce =

American legal scholar

- Education: Lehigh University (B.S.); University of Virginia (J.D.)
- Occupation: Professor of Law
- Employer: George Washington University Law School
- Notable work: Administrative Law Treatise

Richard J. Pierce is an American legal scholar known for his work in Administrative Law and Government Regulation with particular expertise in the energy industry. He is the Lyle T. Alverson Professor of Law at George Washington University Law School. He has been called the "most frequently cited scholar in the United States in the field of administrative law and government regulation". He has published over 150 books and articles and has been extensively cited by United States Courts including the United States Supreme Court. He is a Senior Fellow of the Administrative Conference of the United States.

== Education ==
Pierce earned his J.D. from the University of Virginia School of Law. Prior to Law School, he earned his B.S. in Economics from Lehigh University.

== Professional career ==
After graduating Law School, Pierce worked as an attorney at Sutherland, Asbill & Brennan. In 1977 he began teaching at the University of Kansas School of Law (1977–1981). He then taught at the University of Virginia School of Law (1980–1981), Tulane University School of Law (1981–1984), the University of Pittsburgh School of Law (1984–1986), Southern Methodist University School of Law (1986–1989), and Columbia Law School (1989–1995) before moving to George Washington University School of Law in 1995.

Pierce has testified as an expert on Administrative Law before Congress including on March 15, 2016 before the House Committee on the Judiciary and on July 7, 2016 before the House Committee on the Budget.

== Administrative Law Treatise ==
In 1994, Pierce became co-author of the 3rd edition of Kenneth Culp Davis' Administrative Law Treatise, the "canonical reference guide" that pioneered the field of Administrative Law. When Davis died in 2003, Pierce took over sole authorship for the 4th edition. In 2015 Kristin E. Hickman of the University of Minnesota Law School became Pierce's new co-author on the Treatise.

== Selected works ==
=== Books ===
- Pierce, Richard J. Jr. (2012). Administrative Law (2nd ed.). New York: Foundation Press. ISBN 978-1-60930-113-2. OCLC 778366833.
- Pierce, Richard J. Jr.; Shapiro, Sidney A.; Verkuil, Paul R. (2013). Administrative Law and Process. Foundation Press. ISBN 978-1-60930-309-9. OCLC 865494332.
- Hickman, Kristin E.; Pierce, Richard J. Jr. (2019). Federal Administrative Law: Cases and Materials (3rd ed.). St. Paul, MN.: West Academic. ISBN 978-1-64242-258-0. OCLC 1140123270.
- Hickman, Kristin E.; Pierce, Richard J. (2019). Administrative Law Treatise (6th ed.). New York: Wolters Kluwer. ISBN 978-1-5438-0137-8. OCLC 1053125104.
  - Pierce (Jr.), Richard J. (2010). Administrative Law Treatise (5th ed.). Wolters Kluwer Law & Business. ISBN 978-0-7355-8047-3.
  - Pierce (Jr.), Richard J. (2002). Administrative Law Treatise (4th ed.). Aspen Law & Business. ISBN 978-0-7355-2150-6.
  - Davis, Kenneth Culp; Pierce, Richard J. (1994). Administrative Law Treatise (3rd ed.). Little, Brown. ISBN 978-0-316-17670-5.

=== Articles ===
- — (2004). "Environmental Regulation, Energy, and Market Entry". Duke Environmental Law & Policy Forum. SSRN 571421.
- — (2005). "Realizing the Promise of Restructuring the Electricity Market" (pdf). Wake Forest Law Review. SSRN 585706.
- — (2009). "What Factors Can an Agency Consider in Making a Decision". Michigan State Law Review. 2009: 67. SSRN 1157497.
- — (2011). "What Should We Do About Administrative Law Judge Disability Decisionmaking?" (pdf). GWU Law School Public Law Research Paper No. 573. doi:10.2139/ssrn.1890770. ISSN 1556-5068. SSRN 1890770.
- — (2012). "Natural Gas: A Long Bridge to a Promising Destination". Utah Environmental Law Review. 32: 245. SSRN 1945412.
- — (2013). "Natural Gas Fracking Addresses All of Our Major Problems" (PDF). Journal of Energy and Environmental Law. Summer 2013: 22–25. SSRN 2172441.
- Hammond, Emily; Pierce, Richard J. (2016). "The Clean Power Plan: Testing the Limits of Administrative Law and the Electric Grid" (PDF). George Washington Journal of Energy and Environmental Law. 7 (1): 1–17. S2CID 8202197. SSRN 2704042. Archived from the original (PDF) on 2019-03-09.

=== Court Briefs ===
- Pierce, Richard J. Jr. (2019-11-05). "Supreme Court Brief Of Amicus Curiae Richard J. Pierce, Jr. In Support Of Neither Party". GW Law Faculty Publications & Other Works. SSRN 3483240.
