= Soia Mentschikoff =

American lawyer

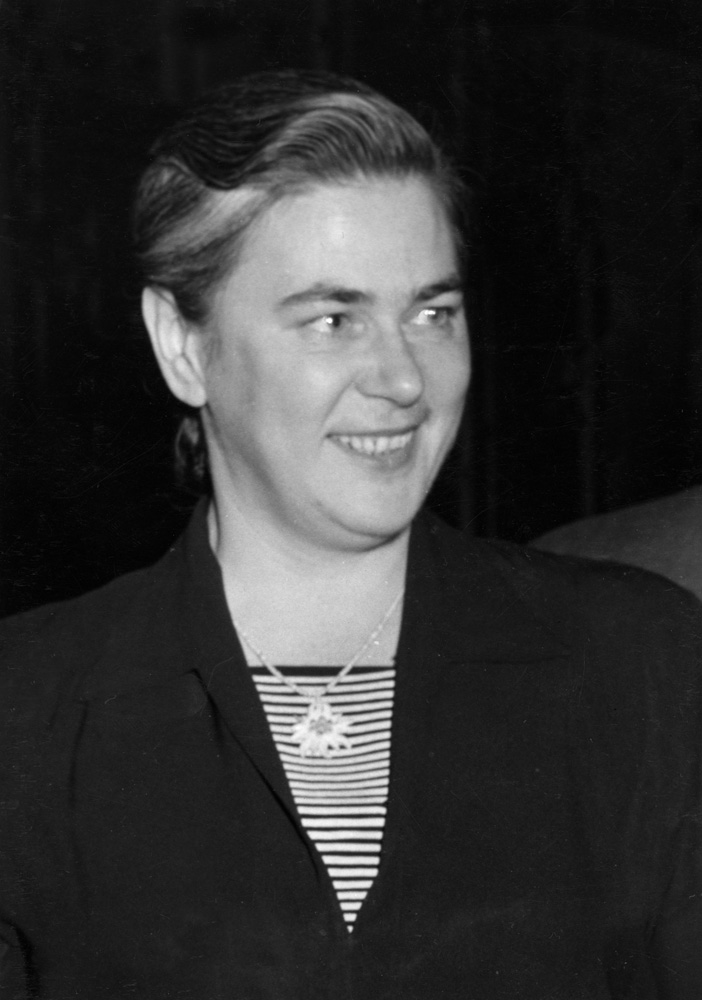

Personal details
- Born: April 2, 1915 Moscow, Russia
- Died: June 18, 1984 (aged 69) Coral Gables, Florida, U.S.
- Party: Democratic
- Spouse: Karl Llewellyn
- Education: Hunter College (BA); Columbia University (JD)
- Known for: First woman Harvard law professor University of Miami School of Law dean

Soia Mentschikoff (Russian: Зоя Меньшикова; April 5, 1915 – June 18, 1984) was a Russian American lawyer, law professor, legal scholar and law school dean, best known for her work in the development and drafting of the Uniform Commercial Code. She served as dean of University of Miami School of Law. She was also the first woman to teach at Harvard Law School.

== Early life and education ==
Mentschikoff was born on April 5, 1915, in the Russian Empire, to American parents. Mentschikoff's parents returned to the United States prior to the Russian Revolution.

In 1930, at age 15, Mentschikoff began her undergraduate education at Hunter College in New York City, where she majored in English and political science. After graduating from Hunter College, she enrolled at Columbia Law School, where she completed her J.D. in 1937.

== Career ==
=== Wall Street attorney ===
After graduating from law school, Mentschikoff worked at several Wall Street law firms, specializing in both commercial law and labor law, particularly in arbitration and mediation. She was one of the first women to become a partner at a large New York City firm, having served as a partner at Spence, Windels, Walser, Hotchkiss & Angell, which was later renamed Spence, Hotchkiss, Parker & Duryee.

=== Uniform Commercial Code ===
While Mentschikoff was still a student at Columbia, she met Karl Llewellyn, a professor there at the time. In 1942, when Llewellyn was appointed by the American Law Institute to be the chief reporter in drafting the Uniform Commercial Code, Mentschikoff was named his assistant. She worked as Llewellyn's research assistant until 1949, when she was named associate chief reporter. In 1954, she became a consultant to the permanent editorial board for the UCC.

=== Harvard and University of Chicago ===
Mentschikoff married Llewellyn in 1946. In 1947, she accepted a teaching position at Harvard Law School, becoming the first woman to ever teach there. In 1951, both were offered teaching positions at the University of Chicago Law School. Due to the school's anti-nepotism rule, Llewellyn was named a "professor," while Mentschikoff was given the title "professorial lecturer." Mentschikoff held this position until Llewellyn's death in 1962, at which point she was made a full professor.

While at the University of Chicago, Mentschikoff became involved in the development of international commercial law. In 1964, she represented the United States at a diplomatic conference in The Hague, where she pushed for a uniform law governing international sales and arbitration.

=== University of Miami ===
In 1967, Mentschikoff began teaching one semester each year at University of Miami School of Law. She was elected a Fellow of the American Academy of Arts and Sciences in 1972. She finally left the University of Chicago for good in 1974, when she was named dean of University of Miami School of Law, a position she would hold until her retirement in 1982. During her tenure as dean, she worked to limit enrollment, improve the law library, and hire quality faculty. She also co-wrote a textbook with Irwin Stotzky which is still used by students enrolled in Legal Elements.

=== Death ===
Mentschikoff died in Coral Gables, Florida, on June 18, 1984. In her honor, the University of Miami Law School published a series of essays regarding her career and contributions in its Inter-American Law Review.
