= Kenneth Culp Davis =

American legal scholar

- Born: December 19, 1908; Leeton, Missouri, U.S.
- Died: August 30, 2003 (aged 94); San Diego, California, U.S.
- Spouse: Inger Davis

Academic background
- Education: Whitman College (BA); Harvard University (LLB)

Academic work
- Discipline: Administrative Law
- Institutions: West Virginia University College of Law; University of Minnesota Law School; University of San Diego Law School
- Notable works: Administrative Law Treatise, Discretionary Justice

Kenneth Culp Davis (December 19, 1908 – August 30, 2003) was an American legal scholar remembered as "the father of administrative law." He was a professor of law at West Virginia University from 1935 to 1939, at the University of Texas at Austin from 1940 to 1948, at Harvard University from 1948 to 1950, at the University of Minnesota from 1950 to 1960, at the University of Chicago from 1961 to 1976, and at the University of San Diego from 1976 until his retirement in 1994.

Davis was a prominent figure in the development of American administrative law. He played a major role in the drafting of the Administrative Procedure Act, which the U.S. Congress passed in 1946, and in 1958 he published the first edition of his treatise on administrative law, which remains the primary treatise on the subject.

== Biography ==
Davis was born on December 19, 1908, in Leeton, Missouri. He received a B.A. from Whitman College in 1931 and an LL.B. from Harvard Law School in 1934.

After law school, Davis practiced law in Cleveland for less than a year before joining the faculty of West Virginia University in 1935. He held a position at the Department of Justice from 1939–1940 before resuming teaching. His teaching career took him to the University of Texas (1940–1948), Harvard (1948–1950), the University of Minnesota (1950–1960) and the University of Chicago (1961–1976). In 1976 he moved to the University of San Diego where he taught until his retirement in 1994.

In 1946, Davis helped draft the Administrative Procedure Act. His 1958 Administrative Law Treatise defined the field of American administrative law by "pulling together information scattered through works on constitutional, procedural and evidence law" and explaining their relevance to "thousands of lawyers who practice before governmental administrative agencies and the judges who review agency decisions" in the context of modern government.

He is also known for his 1969 monograph Discretionary Justice and its 1976 follow-up Police Discretion, in which he argued that more legal restrictions should be placed on administrators in their ability to develop policies. Discretionary Justice has been described as a "short masterpiece".

== Administrative Law Treatise ==
Davis' 1958 Administrative Law Treatise, itself an expansion of his 1951 Administrative Law work, was his magnum opus. Earl W. Kintner, chairman of the Federal Trade Commission, heralded the work in a contemporary review as "...one of the truly monumental events of this generation of legal writing." Davis updated the Treatise with supplemental volumes throughout the 1960s and 1970s to keep the work up-to-date.

In 1978, Davis formed the K.C. Davis Publishing Company in San Diego to publish the 2nd edition of the Treatise. In 1994, he took on Richard J. Pierce as a co-author for the 3rd edition. Following Davis' death, Pierce took over as the sole author of the Treatise which remains in publication to this day.

== Legacy ==
Davis died of natural causes on August 30, 2003, in San Diego, California. He is remembered as "one of the twentieth century's outstanding authorities on administrative law", although his influence was recognized well before his death. Contemporary reviewers refer to his intellectual "stature" and praise his "vivid opinions, his exuberant delight with effective innovation" In 1987, the Los Angeles Times described him as "a lion of jurisprudence, a scholar whose seminal thinking about law and how it is created have made him well-known in the nation's law schools and courthouses."

Following his death, Bill Funk, chairman of the ABA Admin Law section said "Davis’ shadow falls over virtually all that administrative lawyers do,[...] To say he was a giant in his field is like saying Mt. Everest is a big mountain." In 2009, The Yale Biographical Dictionary of American Law referred to his Treatise as the "canonical reference" of Administrative Law. Davis' work continues to be cited in scholarship and court cases.

== Selected works ==
=== Articles ===
- Davis, Kenneth Culp (1941–1942). "Approach to Problems of Evidence in the Administrative Process, An". Harvard Law Review. 55: 364. doi:10.2307/1335092. JSTOR 1335092.
- —— (1955). "Judicial Notice". Columbia Law Review. 55 (7): 945–984. doi:10.2307/1119390. JSTOR 1119390.
- —— (1956). "The Requirement of a Trial-Type Hearing". Harvard Law Review. 70 (2): 193–280. doi:10.2307/1337720. ISSN 0017-811X. JSTOR 1337720.
- —— (1956–1957). "Administrative Officers' Tort Liability". Michigan Law Review. 55 (2): 201–234. doi:10.2307/1285410. JSTOR 1285410.
- —— (1967). "The Information Act: A Preliminary Analysis". The University of Chicago Law Review. 34 (4): 761–816. doi:10.2307/1598993. ISSN 0041-9494. JSTOR 1598993.
- —— (1968). "Standing: Taxpayers and Others". The University of Chicago Law Review. 35 (4): 601–636. doi:10.2307/1598879. ISSN 0041-9494. JSTOR 1598879.
- —— (1970). "The Liberalized Law of Standing". The University of Chicago Law Review. 37 (3): 450–473. doi:10.2307/1599038. ISSN 0041-9494. JSTOR 1599038.
- —— (1970). "Sovereign Immunity Must Go". Administrative Law Review. 22 (3): 383–405. ISSN 0001-8368. JSTOR 40708703.
- —— (1980). "Facts in Lawmaking". Columbia Law Review. 80 (5): 931–942. doi:10.2307/1122091. ISSN 0010-1958. JSTOR 1122091.

=== Books ===
- Administrative Law. 1951. LCCN 51006854.
- Discretionary Justice: A Preliminary Inquiry. Baton Rouge, LA: Louisiana State University Press. 1969. ISBN 9780807103043. OCLC 36148.
- Police Discretion. St. Paul: West Pub. Co. 1975. ISBN 9780314284259.
- Davis, Kenneth Culp; Pierce, Richard J. (1994). Administrative Law Treatise (3rd ed.). Little, Brown. ISBN 9780316176699.
  - Davis, Kenneth Culp (1978–1982). Administrative Law Treatise (2nd ed.). San Diego: K.C. Davis Pub. Co. LCCN 79127213.
  - Davis, Kenneth Culp (1958). Administrative Law Treatise (1st ed.). St. Paul, MN: West Publishing. LCCN 59000557. OCLC 976604819.
