= Jotwell =

Jotwell: The Journal of Things We Like (Lots)
- Discipline: Law
- Language: English
- Edited by: A. Michael Froomkin

Publication details
- History: 2008-present
- Publisher: University of Miami School of Law (United States)
- Frequency: Daily

Standard abbreviations
- ISO 4: Jotwell

Indexing
- ISSN: 2330-1295

Links
- Journal homepage

The Journal of Things We Like (Lots) (known by its abbreviated name Jotwell) is an online legal journal based at and financially subsidized by the University of Miami School of Law in Coral Gables, Florida, United States.

The journal specializes in short scholarly reviews on topics related to the law and is edited primarily but independently by law school professors. Some, including the Editor-in-Chief, are at the University of Miami School of Law but the large majority are at other law schools in the U.S., Canada, and Europe.

== Overview ==
Jotwell was founded in 2008, with the editorial mission of publishing short reviews (called “jots”) by law professors of what they believe to be the best recent scholarship relevant to their field. These jots were typically 500–1,000 words.

Jotwell is organized into sections, each reflecting a legal specialization, including constitutional law, corporate law, and intellectual property law. Each section is managed by section editors with independent editorial control. The section editors select ten to twenty contributing editors, each of whom commits to writing once a year, which ensures that each section of the journal contains one or more articles.

The journal's website (jotwell.com) aggregates content, and new articles typically appear between three and five times a week. All content is available for free and open to reader comment. Jotwell carries no advertising and is supported by the University of Miami School of Law.

Jotwell's editor-in-chief is A. Michael Froomkin, the Laurie Silvers and Mitchell Rubenstein Distinguished Professor of Law at the University of Miami School of Law. Jotwell is published using WordPress and a custom theme.

All Jotwell articles are available under a Creative Commons license, which is an Attribution-Noncommercial-Share Alike 3.0 License.

Jotwell states that its objective is to help academics and others identify the best recent legal scholarship, a task editors deemed important as law review journals have proliferated, now exceeding 350 in North America alone. The journal's mission statement also argues that new scholarly intermediaries are needed now that major journals such as the Harvard Law Review and the Yale Law Journal no longer function as "gatekeepers of legitimacy".

In a 2012 Jotwell article, Ross E. Davies, a law professor at George Mason University School of Law and the editor-in-chief of The Green Bag suggested that if Jotwell were to expand "its coverage to include the best old (as well as new) legal scholarship, and occasionally narrowing its focus to the questions presented in a Supreme Court case, it could produce first-rate amicus briefs of scholarship," which would help the Supreme Court in finding scholarship relevant to its decisions.

In 2014, the ABA Journal, published by the American Bar Association, selected Jotwell as one of the top legal blogs of 2013, listing it in its "Blawg 100."

Jotwell has been identified as an example of an ongoing trend towards web-only law journals. It has been criticized as "highly US-centric" even if "really neat". Jotwell has also been criticized for focusing too much on "articles placed in top law journals."

== Sections ==
The number of sections in Jotwell has grown gradually since 2008. Current sections include: administrative law, classics, constitutional law, corporate Law, courts law, criminal law, cyberlaw, equality, family Law, health law, intellectual property law, jurisprudence, Lex (which includes arbitration, art and cultural property law, education law, election law, energy law, environmental Law, immigration law, librarianship and legal technology, and Native Peoples law), legal history, the legal profession, tax law, tort Law, trusts and estates, and workplace law.
