= Alfred Cilella =

American judge and politician

Alfred J. Cilella (July 18, 1910 – August 4, 1964) was an American judge and politician.

Born in Chicago, Illinois, Cilella graduated from William McKinley High School. He then went to Crane Junior College in 1930 and to University of Illinois in 1931. He then received his law degree from Northwestern University Pritzker School of Law in 1935 and was admitted to the Illinois bar. In 1943 and 1944, Cilella served in the Illinois House of Representatives and was involved with the Democratic Party. He then served on the Chicago City Council from 1951 to 1958. In 1958, Cilella was elected to the Cook County Circuit Court and served until his death. Cilella died at the Hinsdale Sanitarium in Hinsdale, Illinois following a heart attack while playing golf at the Butternut County Club in Oak Brook, Illinois.
