= Miller & Martin =

American law firm

Miller & Martin PLLC
- Headquarters: Chattanooga, Tennessee
- No. of offices: 4
- No. of attorneys: approximately 130
- Major practice areas: General Practice
- Key people: Scott Parrish, Chairman
- Date founded: 1867
- Company type: Professional Limited liability company
- Website: www.millermartin.com

Miller & Martin PLLC is a midsize Southeastern law firm with offices in Atlanta, Georgia, Chattanooga, Tennessee, Nashville, Tennessee, and Charlotte, North Carolina. The firm employs over 130 attorneys and a similar number of support staff.

Miller & Martin's practice was founded in 1867 in Athens, Tennessee, by Col. T.M. Burkett, and later moved to Chattanooga. The firm is named for Burkett Miller (1890–1977), a great-nephew of its founder, and F. Linton Martin (1891–1979). Miller, a 1914 graduate of the University of Virginia School of Law, practiced in Chattanooga for the rest of his life and endowed the Miller Center at the University of Virginia. Miller Park and Miller Plaza in downtown Chattanooga are named for him.

Many of its early clients, such as the original bottler of Coca-Cola, have evolved from local concerns into global enterprises. Miller & Martin is a member of the World Law Group — an international network of independent law firms.

After the 1976 collapse of Hamilton National Bank of Chattanooga, then among the largest bank failures in United States history, the Federal Deposit Insurance Corporation retained Miller & Martin to liquidate and recover assets not taken over by First Tennessee Bank. That work led to comparable assignments from the Federal Savings and Loan Insurance Corporation at failed Texas thrifts and from the FDIC after the early 1980s failure of United American Bank and other institutions run by Jake Butcher and C. H. Butcher.

In November 2009, Nashville attorney Melvin Malone succeeded Howard Levine as chairman of Miller & Martin. Malone had earlier served as a director of the Tennessee Regulatory Authority and as deputy legal counsel to Governor Don Sundquist. Jim Haley became chairman in 2011 and was succeeded in 2019 by Scott Parrish, who joined the firm in 1990 and became a director in 2012.
