= G. Marcus Cole =

American legal academic

11th Dean of the Notre Dame Law School
- Incumbent
- Assumed office July 1, 2019
- Preceded by: Nell Jessup Newton

Personal details
- Education: Cornell University (BS); Northwestern University (JD)

G. Marcus Cole is an American legal scholar on bankruptcy law. He serves as the Joseph A. Matson Dean and Professor of Law at the Notre Dame Law School. His field of study is in the law of bankruptcy, corporate reorganization, and venture capital.

== Biography ==
=== Education ===
Cole received a Bachelor of Science with a major in applied economics from Cornell University in 1989 and a Juris Doctor from Northwestern University in 1993.

=== Career ===
Cole became an associate with the Chicago law firm of Mayer Brown, and then clerked for Judge Morris S. Arnold of the United States Court of Appeals for the Eighth Circuit.

He joined the faculty of Stanford Law School in 1997 and was Wm. Benjamin Scott and Luna M. Scott professor of law. He also taught for Law Preview, the law school prep course.

In January 2019, Cole was appointed Joseph A. Matson Dean of the Law School and professor of law at the University of Notre Dame by university president John I. Jenkins, effective on July 1, 2019.

=== Social engagement ===
Cole has also served on the editorial board of the Cato Supreme Court Review, the advisory board of the Independent Institute's Center on Culture and Civil Society, the academic advisory board of BARBRI, and as a member of the U.S. Court of Appeals for the Ninth Circuit’s Bankruptcy Judicial Advisory Committee.

Cole served on the board of include the Central Pacific Region of the Anti-Defamation League of B’nai B’rith and Businesses United in Investing, Lending and Development (BUILD). He also served as president of the board of directors of Rocketship Education and was served on the board of trustees of Bellarmine College Preparatory.

== Personal life ==
Cole is a practicing Catholic. His son, Claude, played football at the University of Wyoming.

== Publications ==
- Delaware is Not a State: Are We Witnessing Jurisdictional Competition in Bankruptcy?, 55 Vanderbilt Law Review 1845-1916 (November 2002).
