= University of Miami School of Law =

Law school in Coral Gables, Florida, US

Coordinates: 25.7207208°N 80.279955°W

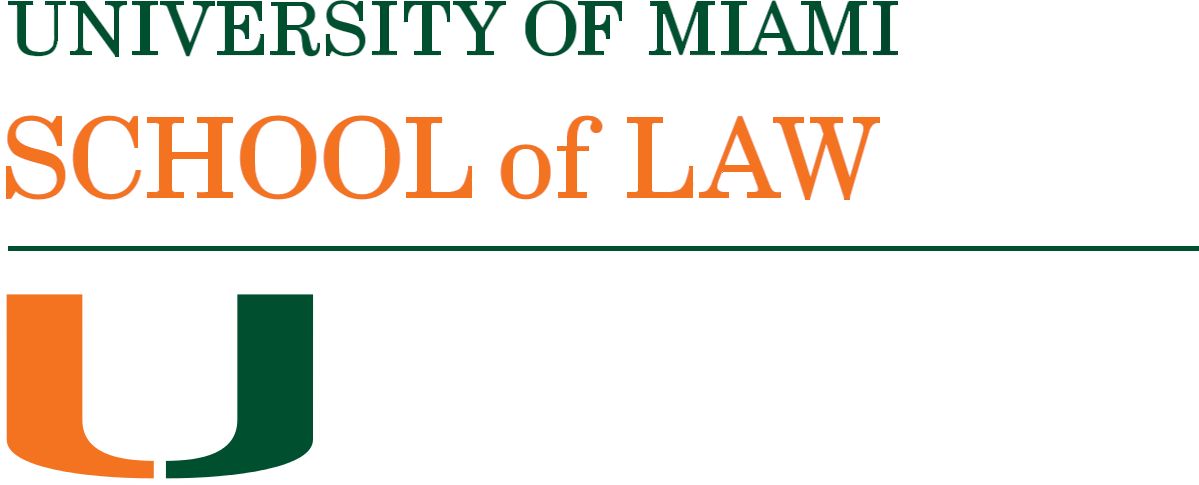
- Established: 1926; 100 years ago
- School type: Private law school
- Dean: Patricia Sanchez Abril
- Location: Coral Gables, Florida, U.S.
- Enrollment: 993
- Faculty: 99 full-time, 261 part-time
- USNWR ranking: 70th (2026)
- Bar pass rate: 86.1% (Florida bar exam, July 2025 first-time takers)
- Website: www.law.miami.edu

The University of Miami School of Law (Miami Law or UM Law) is the law school of the University of Miami, a private research university in Coral Gables, Florida.

Founded in 1926, it is the oldest law school in South Florida, graduating its first class of 13 students in 1929. The school offers 300 courses in 18 areas of study, 17 legal clinics and practicums, and over two dozen interdisciplinary and joint-degree programs.

== Campus ==
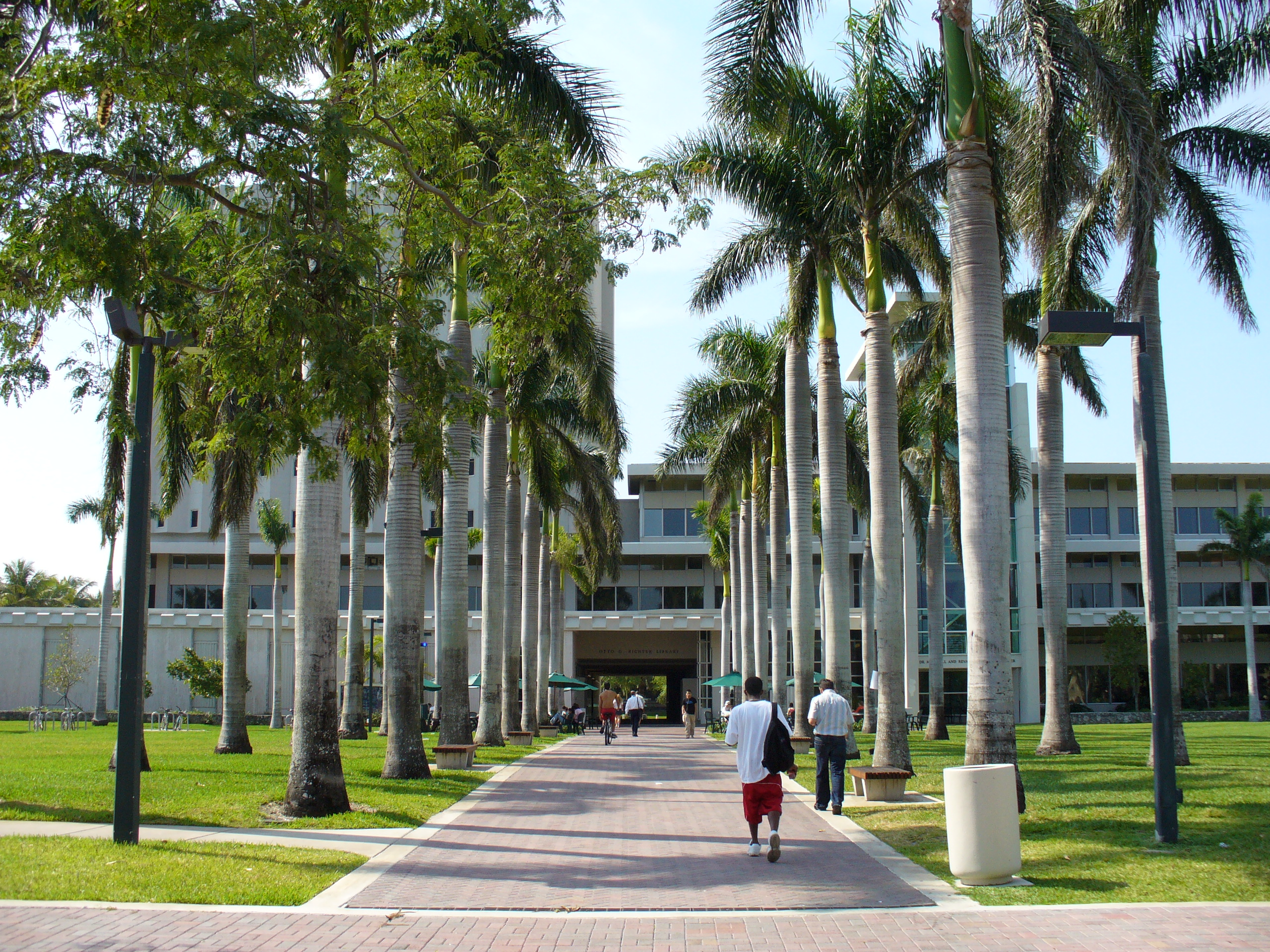
The University of Miami campus in April 2006

The University of Miami School of Law is on the main campus of the University of Miami in Coral Gables, 5 miles (8.0 km) south of downtown Miami, the ninth largest metropolitan area in the United States. The law school is centered on a central courtyard on the University of Miami campus called the Bricks.

The school has a collection of over 600,000 volumes in print and microform and subscribes to a large list of electronic resources.

== Academics ==
The University of Miami School of Law was founded concurrently with the University of Miami's founding in 1926. Starting in 1952, the school introduced and began offering an LL.M. degree in taxation. In 1957, it developed and began to offer an LL.M. in Inter-American Law. In 1959, a Master in Comparative Law (now an LL.M.) was introduced. In 1998, the school decided to reduce the size of its entering JD classes by 15 percent.

In 2010, LawWithoutWalls was sponsored by University of Miami School of Law, where 30 schools from 15 countries participate annually.

In addition to its JD and LL.M degrees, University of Miami School of Law also offers several joint-degree programs in international arbitration, maritime law, tax law, business, and other subjects.

The University of Miami School of Law hosts the annual Heckerling Institute on Estate Planning, a conference for estate planning professionals, and its graduate estate planning program is one of the best regarded in the country. The law school also hosts an annual symposium for psychology, public policy, and law, as well as an annual class action and complex litigation forum.

The school offers extensive public interest programs and opportunities for its students, including with the Center for Ethics and Public Service that offers in-house clinics and educational programs including the Children and Youth Law Clinic, Health and Elder Law Clinic, and Corporate and Professional Responsibility Program. The HOPE Public Interest Resource Center at University of Miami School of Law grants law students an opportunity to become involved in over 25 different projects annually, reaching various underserved and at-risk populations locally, nationally, and abroad.

=== Curriculum ===
The University of Miami School of Law has 265 faculty members and a student to faculty ratio of 7:1. First-year students take a series of required courses covering the theory and substance of law while exploring political, commercial, and social dimensions of legal institutions. In addition to required courses, first-year students also are permitted to choose one elective in their second semester.

University of Miami School of Law students have the opportunity to combine their J.D. degrees with a variety of concurrent degrees, including an MBA from the Miami Herbert Business School and graduate degrees in communication, music business, public health, or marine affairs. There is also a joint J.D./LL.M. program in which students can complete both degrees in seven semesters in the areas of taxation, international law, international arbitration, ocean and coastal law, and real property development. The law school also offers programs leading to a LL.M. degree in taxation, estate planning, real property, entertainment, arts, and sports law, comparative law, inter-American law, international law, international arbitration, and ocean and coastal law.

=== Accreditations ===
The University of Miami School of Law is accredited by the American Bar Association and is a member of the Association of American Law Schools.

== Students ==
=== Admissions ===
As of 2025, median LSAT for University of Miami School of Law students is 164 and median undergraduate GPA is 3.79, with an acceptance rate of 24.65%.

=== Costs ===
Total cost of attendance (including tuition, fees, and living expenses) at University of Miami School of Law was $74,815 annually as of the 2015-2016 academic year. Law School Transparency's estimated debt-financed cost of attendance for three years is $259,857.

=== Student demographics ===
As of December 2025, the University of Miami School of Law has a total student body of approximately 1,074. The entering JD class of August 2025 had students ranging in age from 19 to 39, 58% of which were women. 61% of the entering class spoke at least one foreign language. 14% was a first-generation college student and 74% first-generation law student. 54% were out of undergrad for at least one year before enrolling. The class had students from 104 undergraduate institutions.

=== Student activities ===
==== Journals and publications ====
The University of Miami School of Law's flagship student-edited law review is University of Miami Law Review. The School also publishes four additional law school student-edited journals:

- Business Law Review
- Inter-American Law Review
- International & Comparative Law Review
- Race and Social Justice Law Review

The School sponsors Jotwell, a peer-reviewed legal blog specializing in short reviews of recent legal scholarly publications.

==== Moot Court & Mock Trial programs ====
The University of Miami School of Law offers students the opportunity to compete for membership on both the Charles C. Papy Jr. Moot Court Board and the International Moot Court Board. Both boards make up Miami's Moot Court Board, which is ranked 3rd in the nation as of 2023. The Charles C. Papy Moot Court Board hosts a Negotiation Competition, Mock Trial Competition, Fall and Spring C. Clyde Atkins Advanced Moot Court Competitions, and the John T. Gaubatz Competition. The board also participates in numerous inter-school competitions across the nation. In 2011, the Charles C. Papy Moot Court Board advanced to the finals of the American Bar Association's Law Student Division National Appellate Advocacy Competition with one team member winning the competition's Best Oralist Award. The school also offers the students the opportunity to compete on the Yvette Ostoloza Mock Trial Team.

==== International Moot Court program ====
University of Miami School of Law is the only U.S. law school with an International Moot Court Program (IMCP), which prepares student to compete in several public and private law competitions held around the world. The law school hosts a pre-moot for the Willem C. Vis International Commercial Arbitration Moot each spring that attracts competitors from law schools in Europe, Central America, and South America. In 2010, the University of Miami's School of Law's IMCP won second place overall at the ICC Moot in The Hague and won two of the top three oralist awards. In 2019, the University of Miami School of Law's IMCP placed first in the U.S. and second overall in the Americas round of the ICC competition. The School's International Arbitration LL.M. Program has performed well in several arbitral moots. In 2011, IMCP won first place at the Frankfurt Investment Arbitration Moot Court competition held in Frankfurt, Germany. In the Willem C. Vis International Commercial Arbitration Moot, held in Vienna, Austria, IMCP has taken home multiple awards, including "Honorable Mentions" for Best Oralist from 2006 to 2009 and finished 14th out of 252 schools of law in 2010. Other competitions that the University of Miami School of Law’s IMCP participate in include the Inter-American Human Rights Moot Court Competition, hosted by American University in Washington D.C. and MOOTMadrid, hosted in Madrid, Spain.

==== Student Bar Association and Honor Council ====
The University of Miami's School of Law offers participation in the Student Bar Association, (SBA), which serves as the law school's student government and works closely with the faculty and administration to improve student life on the law school campus. The SBA also acts as a conduit to the American Bar Association and the school's SBA president and its elected ABA representatives serve as delegates to the national SBA convention. The University of Miami School of Law also has a student-run Honor Council, which investigates and adjudicates alleged violations of the Honor Code of the School of Law, which is chaired by the School's Honor Council president.

==== Study abroad programs ====
The University of Miami School of Law offers 27 Study Abroad options in 14 countries

=== Alumni ===
According to University of Miami School of Law's Association for Legal Career Professionals (NALP) disclosures, 92% of the Class of 2024 were employed within ten months of graduation. University of Miami's Law School Transparency underemployment score is 13.8%, indicating the percentage of the Class of 2017 that was either unemployed, pursuing an additional degree, or working in non-professional, short-term, or part-time jobs nine months after graduating.

The job-placement rate for graduates of the University of Miami School of Law is greater than or equal to the average national job placement rate for the past six years. The American Bar Association reports that within nine months of graduation about 75% of the 260 students in the University of Miami School of Law's Class of 2017 were employed in jobs requiring a Juris Doctor and eighteen students were reported as unemployed. Among the University of Miami School of Law's 2017 graduates, 63 graduates are employed in small law firms consisting of between two and ten attorneys, 49 graduates are employed in business or industry, 27 graduates are employed in large law firms (defined as firms with over 251 full-time attorneys).

The University of Miami School of Law has more than 20,000 alumni practicing law throughout the United States and approximately 80 countries around the world.

== Rankings ==
In 2026, U.S. News & World Report ranked the University of Miami School of Law tied for the 92nd-best law school in the nation, down from 82nd-best in 2024, and down from 72nd-best in 2021. As of April 8, 2026, U.S. News World Report Ranked the University of Miami School of Law tied for 70th in the nation.

In 2019, the University of Miami School of Law's White & Case International Arbitration LL.M. Program was ranked among the top 10 alternative dispute resolution degrees globally. Its Academic Achievement Program provides participating students additional tools to succeed in law school.

== Deans ==
University of Miami School of Law has had 18 deans since its 1926 founding, including:

- Richmond A. Rasco, 1926 – 1931
- Russell A. Rasco 1931 - 1957
- James A. Burnes, 1957 – 1961
- Wesley Alba Sturges, 1961 – 1962
- M. Minnette Massey, 1962 – 1966
- Frederick D. Lewis, 1966 – 1973
- Thomas A. Thomas, 1973 – 1974
- Soia Mentschikoff, 1974 – 1982
- Claude R. Sowle, 1982 – 1986
- Mary E. Doyle, 1986 – 1994 and interim dean, 1998 – 1999
- Samuel C. Thompson, 1994 – 1998
- Dennis O. Lynch, 1999 – 2008
- Paul R. Verkuil, 2008 – 2009
- Patricia D. White, 2009 – 2019
- Anthony E. Varona, 2019 – 2021
- Nell Jessup Newton, interim dean, 2021–2022
- David Yellen, 2022 – 2024
- Patricia Sanchez Abril, 2024 – present (interim dean 2024 – 2026)

== Notable present and past faculty ==
- Alan S. Becker, evidence
- A. Jay Cristol, bankruptcy
- John Hart Ely, constitutional law and theory
- Mary Anne Franks, constitutional and criminal law
- Susan Haack, pragmatist philosopher and legal scholar
- David Ladd, copyright
- Dexter Lehtinen, former federal attorney
- Soia Mentschikoff, international commercial law, Dean (1974 to 1982)
- Marilyn Milian, trial advocacy, host of The People's Court
- Nell Jessup Newton, Native American law
- Jan Paulsson, international arbitration
- Marybeth Peters, copyright
- Stephen Urice, cultural property law
- Bruce Winick, mental health law
- Steven Winter, constitutional law and theory
