= List of homicides in Wisconsin =

This is a list of homicides in Wisconsin. This list includes notable homicides committed in the U.S. state of Wisconsin that have a Wikipedia article on the killing, the killer, or the victim. It is divided into three subject areas as follows:

1. Multiple homicides – homicides having multiple victims.
2. Serial killers – persons who murder three or more persons with the incidents taking place over more than a month and including a significant period of time between them
3. Single homicides – notable homicides involving a single fatality

Among the works dealing with homicides in Wisconsin are Wisconsin Murders by August Derleth and Got Murder? The Shocking Story of Wisconsin's Notorious Killers by Martin Hintz.

== Multiple homicides ==
Listed in chronological order

Incident	Location	Date	Deaths	Description	Sources
Taliesin murders	Spring Green	1914-08-14	7	Murder of Frank Lloyd Wright's mistress, Mamah Borthwick, and six others by a chef working at the site	
Christopher Scarver	Portage	1991-11-28	2	Killed Jeffrey Dahmer while in prison, also killed another prisoner at the same time; previously killed a Wisconsin Conservation Corps supervisor in 1990	
Chai Vang	Meteor	2004-11-21	6	Deer hunting dispute turned into mass shooting	
Terry Ratzmann	Brookfield	2005-03-12	8	Mass shooting at Living Church of God	
Crandon shooting	Crandon	2007-10-07	7	Off-duty sheriff's deputy fatally shot six persons, including his ex-girlfriend, at a post-homecoming party and then committed suicide	
Yolanda Brown	Milwaukee	2007-10-16	2	R&B singer and record producer fatally shot at recording studio	
Wisconsin Sikh temple shooting	Oak Creek	2012-08-05	8	Mass shooting at Sikh temple	
Azana Spa shooting	Brookfield	2012-10-21	4	Estranged husband of worker entered spa in suburban Milwaukee, four killed including the wife and shooter	
Aaron Schaffhausen	River Falls	2012-07-10	3	Father slit throats of his three daughters (ages 5, 8, and 11) the year after divorce from their mother	
Steven Zelich	West Allis	2012–2013	2	Former police officer known as the "Wisconsin Suitcase Murderer"	
Ashlee Martinson	Piehl	2015-03-07	2	Convicted of murdering her mother and stepfather on the day after her 17th birthday	
Kidnapping of Jayme Closs	Barron	2018-10-15	2	21-year-old broke into house, fatally shot parents, and kidnapped 13-year-old girl for 88 days	
Milwaukee brewery shooting	Milwaukee	2020-02-26	6	A 51-year-old worker at Molson Coors brewery fatally shot five coworkers and then committed suicide	
Kenosha unrest shooting	Kenosha	2020-08-25	2	17-year-old Kyle Rittenhouse fatally shot two men and wounded another, using an AR-15 rifle; Rittenhouse claimed self-defense and was found not guilty	
Waukesha Christmas parade attack	Waukesha	2021-11-21	6	Six killed and 62 injured when the perpetrator deliberately hit participants and observers with his SUV at Christmas parade	

== Serial killers ==
Listed in chronological order by date of earliest homicide

Incident	Location	Date	Deaths	Description	Sources
Ed Gein	Plainfield	1947–1957	2–9	Known as the "Butcher of Plainfield"	
George Lamar Jones	Wisconsin, Mississippi	1972–1997	3+	Serial killer who lived for a time in Milwaukee	
Joseph Paul Franklin	Multiple	1977–1980	8–20+	White supremacist killer executed 2013	
Walter E. Ellis	Milwaukee	1986–2007	8–10+	Known as "The Milwaukee North Side Strangler"	
Edward Edwards	Wisconsin, Ohio	1977–1996	5–15+	Six confirmed victims	
Jeffrey Dahmer	Ohio, Wisconsin	1978–1991	17	Known as the "Milwaukee Cannibal"	
David Van Dyke	Milwaukee	1979–1980	6	Burglar who murdered people after tricking them into letting him into their homes	
Lorenzo Fayne	Wisconsin, Illinois	1989–1993	6	Serial killer and rapist who murdered one woman and five children in the states of Wisconsin and Illinois	

== Single homicides ==
Incident	Location	Date	Description	Sources
John McCaffary	Kenosha	1850-07-23	Convicted of drowning his wife in a cistern, his execution was botched, leading to the abolition of capital punishment in Wisconsin	
Little Lord Fauntleroy	Waukesha	1921-03-28	Unsolved murder of young boy found floating in a pond	
Murder of Christine Schultz	Milwaukee	1981-05-28	Former Milwaukee police officer convicted for the murder of her husband's ex-wife; she escaped in 1990 in an episode that inspired the slogan "Run, Bambi, Run"	
Arthur "Buddy" Schumacher	Wauwatosa	1925-07	Unsolved murder of 8-year-old boy; later the subject of the 2012 book Murder in Wauwatosa: The Mysterious Death of Buddy Schumacher	
Jack Zuta	Delafield	1930-08-01	Organized crime figure fatally shot at a roadhouse	
Sterling Hall bombing	Madison	1970-08-24	Bombing at University of Wisconsin as protest of connections with military research during Vietnam War, a physics researcher was killed and three others injured	
Murder of Lisa Ann French	Fond du Lac	1973-10-31	9-year old girl murdered and sexually assaulted by neighbor while trick-or-treating alone	
Murder of Amber Creek	Burlington	1997-02	Teenager who ran away from a youth shelter; suspect convicted of her murder 19 years later	
Murder of Margaret Anderson	Green Bay	1983-12-26	35-year-old woman tortured and killed by members of 1%er motorcycle gangs.	
Murder of Traci Hammerberg	Grafton	1984-12-15	18-year-old murdered while walking home from a party; murderer identified 35 years later	
Murder of Susan Poupart	Lac du Flameau	1990-05-20	Unsolved murder of 29-year-old Native American woman	
Jesse Anderson	Milwaukee	1992-04-21	Convicted of murdering his wife Barbara Anderson; was then murdered along with Jeffrey Dahmer in prison by Christopher Scarver	
Murder of Alfred Kunz	Dane	1998-03-04	Unsolved murder of a Catholic priest found in church with his throat slit	
Death of Julie Jensen	Pleasant Prairie	1998-12-03	Husband convicted of murdering his wife; conviction later overturned; notable for admission into evidence of a letter written by deceased expressing suspicion of husband's intentions	
Murder of Glenn Kopitske	Winnebago County	2003-07-21	Thrill killing of a bipolar 37-year-old man	
Murder of Teresa Halbach (Steven Avery, Brendan Dassey)	Manitowoc County	2005-10-31	Photographer murdered by man who hired her to photograph a minivan, later the subject of the Netflix series Making a Murderer	
2006 Weston High School shooting	Cazenovia	2006-09-29	Student fatally shot high school principal	
Murder of Cha Vang	Green Bay	2007-01-05	30-year-old Hmong man shot and stabbed by James Nichols who had expressed racial animus to Hmong people	
Murder of Erika Hill	Fitchburg	2007-02	15-year-old girl was victim of long term abuse and starvation, then beaten, stabbed and asphyxiated by mother	
Murder of Amy Yeary	Campbellsport	2008-08	18-year-old woman murdered in 2008, body was unidentified for 13 years, aka "Fond du Lac County Jane Doe"	
Murder of Hussain Saeed Alnahdi	Menomonie	2016-10-31	24-year-old student from Saudi Arabia beaten to death outside a pizzeria in downtown Menomonie	
Killing of Ee Lee	Milwaukee	2020-09-19	Woman raped and murdered by two teenage boys on video in front of nine other youths	
Murder of Shad Thyrion	Green Bay	2022-02-21	24-year-old American man killed during sexual intercourse and then dismembered.	
Killing of Lily Peters	Chippewa Falls	2022-04-22	10-year-old girl raped and murdered, her 14-year-old cousin was arrested and is being tried as an adult	
John Pier Roemer	New Lisbon	2022-06-03	Juneau County judge fatally shot by a man convicted in his court six years earlier	
Death of Sade Robinson	Milwaukee	2024-04-01	19-year-old woman killed and dismembered.	
