= Wisconsin shooting =

Wisconsin shooting may refer to:

- The Crandon shooting, at a party on October 7, 2007
- The Wisconsin Sikh temple shooting, August 5, 2012
- The Azana Spa shooting, October 21, 2012
- The 2017 Marathon County shootings, March 22, 2017
- The Milwaukee brewery shooting, February 26, 2020
- The Mayfair Mall shooting, November 20, 2020
- The Abundant Life Christian School shooting, December 16, 2024
