= George Jones (disambiguation) =

George Jones (1931–2013) was an American country music singer and songwriter.

George Jones may also refer to:

== Arts and literature ==
- George Jones (painter) (1786–1869), Royal Academy keeper, war painter
- George Jones (1810–1879), English-born American actor and eccentric later known as George, Count Joannes
- George Jones (radio presenter) (born 1944), radio and TV personality, founder member of Clubsound, Belfast
- George Jones, blues musician better known as Little Hat Jones
- George 'Wydell' Jones, member of the Edsels

== Business and industry ==
- George Noble Jones (1811–1876), American plantation owner
- George Jones (publisher) (1811–1891), co-founder of the New York Times
- George Fowler Jones (1818–1905), British architect
- George Howell Jones (1887–1950), American architect

== Law and politics ==
=== United States ===
- George Jones (Georgia politician) (1766–1838), American senator from Georgia
- George Wallace Jones (1804–1896), American senator from Iowa
- George Washington Jones (Tennessee politician) (1806–1884), American representative from Tennessee
- George Washington Jones (Texas politician) (1828–1903), American representative from Texas
- George R. Jones (1862–1936), president of the Massachusetts Senate (1903–1904)
- George Philip Jones (1877–1954), judge of the United States District Court of the Virgin Islands
- G. Lewis Jones (1907–1971), American ambassador
- George Fleming Jones, American diplomat on the List of ambassadors of the United States to Guyana

=== Elsewhere ===
- George Jones (New Zealand politician) (1844–1920), New Zealand politician
- George Jones (Australian politician) (1866–1938), New South Wales politician
- George Burpee Jones (1866–1950), Canadian merchant and politician
- George Jones (Newfoundland politician) (1867–1949), Newfoundland mariner, magistrate and politician
- George Jones (British politician) (1874–1956), Conservative MP for Stoke Newington 1918–1923, 1924–1945
- George Henry Jones (1884–1956), British trade unionist and politician
- George Hall Jones, member of the Queensland Legislative Assembly, Australia

== Military ==
- George Jones (navy chaplain) (1800–1870), American Navy chaplain and participant in 1852 Perry Expedition to Japan
- George Jones (Canadian admiral) (1895–1946), Canadian admiral
- George Jones (RAAF officer) (1896–1992), Royal Australian Air Force
- George M. Jones (1911–1996), American Army brigadier general
- George L. Jones (1918–1997), Korean War flying ace
- George Matthew Jones (1785?–1831), British Royal Navy captain and traveller

== Sports ==
=== Association football (soccer) ===
- George Jones (footballer, born 1889) (1889–1969), English footballer who played for Southampton
- George Jones (footballer, born 1895) (1895–1970), English footballer for Everton, Wigan Borough and Southport
- George Jones (footballer, born 1918) (1918–1995), English footballer who played for Sheffield United
- George Jones (footballer, born 1930) (1930–2017), Welsh footballer who played for Wrexham
- George Jones (footballer, born 1945), English footballer who played for Bury

=== Other sports ===
- George Jones (Surrey cricketer) (1856–1936), English cricketer
- George Daniel Jones (c. 1900–1969), British swimming coach, founder of Bristol Central Swimming Club, and George Medal recipient
- George Jones (Hampshire cricketer) (1907–1953), Scottish cricketer
- George Jones (American football) (born 1973), American football player
- George Jones (sport shooter), British Olympic shooter

== Others ==
- George Jones (bishop) (died 1804), Irish Anglican bishop of Kilmore and of Kildare
- George Jones (British journalist), political editor of The Telegraph
- George Jones (bushranger) (1815–1844), Australian bushranger
- George W. Jones (printer) (1860–1942), printer and type designer
- George Heber Jones (1867–1919), American missionary in Korea
- George Cecil Jones (1873–1960), Welsh chemist and occultist
- George Neville Jones (1903–1970), English-born botanist
- George Hilton Jones III (1924–2008), American historian, professor and author
- George William Jones (1938–2017), professor of government at the London School of Economics
- George Lamar Jones (1945–2012), American serial killer
- George Sydney Jones (1864–1927), Australian-born English-trained architect

== See also ==
- George Jones (We Can Make It), or George Jones, a 1972 album by George Jones
