= Chai Vang =

American convicted murderer (1968–2026)

- Born: Chai Soua Vang; September 24, 1968; Sainyabuli Province, Laos
- Died: June 10, 2026 (aged 57); Oshkosh, Wisconsin, U.S.
- Occupation: Truck driver
- Children: 7
- Penalty: Six consecutive life terms plus 70 years

Details
- Date: November 21, 2004
- Locations: Meteor, Wisconsin, US
- Killed: 6
- Injured: 2
- Weapon: 7.62×39mm Saiga
- Imprisoned at: Oshkosh Correctional Institution

Chai Soua Vang (RPA: Cai Suav Vaj; September 24, 1968 – June 10, 2026), more commonly known as Chai Vang, was a Laotian immigrant man who was convicted of six counts of first degree intentional homicide. Vang, a six-year veteran of the California National Guard, shot eight people while he was trespassing upon a deer hunting group in northern Wisconsin on November 21, 2004; six were killed and two were wounded. The killings were later dubbed the Tree Stand Murders by author David B. Whitehurst.

The killings caused tensions between White and Hmong hunters in Wisconsin, which culminated in the murder of Cha Vang in January 2007.

== Biography ==
Chai Soua Vang was born in Sayaboury Province, Laos, as one of six children to a family of Hmong descent. Vang's father fought as a guerrilla for the CIA during the Vietnam War. In 1975, following the communist victory in the Laotian Civil War, Vang spent most of his childhood in a refugee camp in Thailand.

Vang and his siblings relocated to the United States in 1980 and settled in St. Paul, Minnesota. In his teens, Vang worked as a paper delivery boy before moving to Stockton, California, in 1985. During high school, Vang became a U.S. citizen, joined the California Cadet Corps, and was the founder and leader of the Hmong Student Association. After his graduation in 1987, Vang was employed as a social service worker for Hmong refugees.

He enlisted in the California National Guard at age 21, serving from 1989 to 1995 as part of the 236th Medical Brigade. He was decorated with a Good Conduct medal and attained a sharpshooter qualification badge (mid-level, above the rank of Marksman). He worked as a truck driver in Sacramento following his discharge.

By 1999, Vang received an associate degree in business administration and operated a long-haul trucking service. In 2000, Vang and his family moved back to St. Paul, where he took a delivery job. Vang was the father of seven children. He was also a family shaman (txiv neeb) and was a hunting enthusiast.

On Christmas Eve 2001, police responded to a 911 call from Vang's house, according to a Minneapolis Police Department report. The quarrel allegedly began when Vang said he wanted to go out and his wife, Say Xiong, did not want him to leave. Vang's daughter, Kia, recalled running out of her room and seeing her father with a gun. Police arrested Chai Vang, but charges never were filed because, according to the police, Xiong did not cooperate with investigators. A few months later, Xiong moved with the couple's five children to live with her parents in Milwaukee.

Vang's second marriage ended in 2003, after he allegedly nearly choked his wife to death for gambling away $3,000. He remarried again in 2004.

== Shootings ==
On the weekend of the shootings, Vang went out deer hunting with two friends and their two sons in northwest Wisconsin, a region where deer hunting is particularly popular, east of Birchwood, Wisconsin, around the town of Meteor. Meteor extends over a large sparsely populated area. The land in the area is a mix of public and private. It is believed that Vang and his friends began their day on public land, but he later went onto a private 400 acres (1.6 km^{2}) tract of land.

On Sunday, November 21, a hunting party of about 15 people were in a cabin on this private land. Terry Willers, one of the two co-owners of the land, left the cabin and saw Vang sitting in a deer stand. Willers used a handheld radio to ask the people still in the cabin whether or not anyone should be in the stand. Upon receiving a response in the negative, he approached Vang and told him to leave the property and allegedly called Vang racial slurs. Vang then apologized and started moving south towards a trail through a forested area of the property. According to Terry Willers' testimony, "As Bob got back on the radio and asked me where he was at and I said, uh, he's heading south down on the food plot right now. I radioed in to the cabin that I had a tree-rat and I had chased him off." At that point five of the hunters from the cabin who had heard the radio message arrived at the tree stand. Lauren Hesebeck, a surviving victim, stated "Bob had said I'm going to go talk to him to find out who he is, why he's there, and make sure he doesn't, you know, knows that he's on private property and that he's not welcomed there. Denny had said to me this ought to be interesting, let's go and see what's going on. We got in the back of it standing up (ATV), hanging on the rear bar." After following the directions given by Terry Willers, they proceeded to approach Vang further down the trail. Crotteau then suggested making a note of his hunting license number to make a report to the DNR and, according to Hesebeck's testimony, Crotteau flipped over the hunting tag on Vang's back to get his license number.

The events after the confrontation are disputed. A violent altercation broke out and four of the eight victims were shot in the back, and three of these four were hit by multiple rounds. Vang is believed to have fired about 20 rounds from a Saiga rifle chambered in 7.62×39mm, which was recovered by police. One of the wounded hunters died the next day, bringing the toll to six dead and two wounded. Vang raised his rifle in one smooth, continuous sweeping motion as he circled right, kneeled, and aimed at Terry Willers. Vang later said, "If I don't shoot him, he would shoot me." Hours after the shooting, Hesebeck told his wife that Willers did fire at Vang, though he later testified claiming that no one pointed a gun at or fired at Vang.

Vang's first shot missed Willers as he ran and dove for cover, but Willers landed atop his rifle and could not turn over before Vang's second shot hit his lower left neck, neutralizing him. Vang instantly turned toward the men on their machines and shot Roidt; the round killed him before he fell, as his ATV, still in gear, moved slowly forward. Vang then shot and killed Drew. As the Crotteaus fled in fear, Vang fired three shots at Hesebeck at close range while chasing him around the ATV. The third round partially disemboweled Hesebeck, who fell and lay still.

Bob Crotteau fled and called the cabin on his walkie-talkie, to tell Laski to bring guns. While Vang's first shot missed, a second hit and killed Bob Crotteau. Willers, meanwhile, had regained feeling in his fingers, and called the cabin for help.

By that time Vang was chasing Joey Crotteau, who fled down a trail. Vang sprinted to cut the corner to the trail, to close the gap, and shot him in the lower back at about 65 yards. Vang reloaded, and approached closer, as Crotteau struggled forward, and shot him again. Vang then closed in and shot him twice more from behind, including a final round into his head.

Vang, after reversing his blaze-orange jacket to its camo side, hid near a curve in the trail when he heard the ATV approaching. Thinking Jessica Willers and Laski were likely armed and looking for him, Vang waited until they passed. When he fired, the bullet struck Willers in the left buttock, and struck Laski, shattering his lower spine and abdomen. Vang ran over, shot Laski through the back, and then stepped behind Willers, and fired a shot through her neck.

He returned to the site of the first shootings to retrieve his scope. As he neared the site, he and Hesebeck came face to face. Vang said, "You're not dead yet?" He raised his rifle and fired, as Hesebeck grabbed Willers' rifle with his right hand and dove for cover. The shots went over Hesebeck's head.

Though he could point but not aim the rifle because of a wounded left arm, Hesebeck tried to shoot back. But when he pulled the trigger, the safety was still engaged. He dragged the unfamiliar rifle alongside his body to feel for the safety, and pushed it in. He pointed it again and fired once. He then heard a slight metallic sound from Vang's rifle, and realized Vang was out of bullets.

Vang fled the scene on foot and discarded his remaining ammunition, later stating that he did not want to shoot anyone else. Vang eventually came across another hunter riding an ATV (who had no affiliation with the victims), and this hunter offered to give him a ride, eventually taking him to Vang's cabin. Vang was arrested when he returned to his cabin five hours after the shooting. An officer waiting for Vang placed him into custody and transported him to the Sawyer County Jail. His bail was set at $2.5 million.

=== Victims ===
The victims were part of a group of about 15 people who made an annual opening-weekend trip to the Crotteau-Willers property. Among those killed were father and son Robert and Joey Crotteau and Willers' daughter Jessica Willers.

Those who were killed:

- Robert James "Bob" Crotteau, 42, hit center-mass.
- Joseph G. "Joey" Crotteau, 20, four hits center-mass.
- Allan James Laski, 43, three hits center-mass.
- Mark Joshua Roidt, 28, single headshot.
- Jessica Marie Willers, 27, two hits center-mass.
- Dennis Robert "Denny" Drew, 55, single gutshot.

Those who survived:

- Lauren Hesebeck, 48, neck gunshot
- Terry Willers, 47, shoulder gunshot

== Investigation ==
There have been conflicting reports about what may have led to the shootings. According to subsequent oral statements by Vang, one of the local hunters, Terry Willers, took the first shot at him from about 100 feet (30 m) away, and therefore the shootings were in self-defense. No shell casing was ever recovered from Willers' gun even though during the trial Hesebeck admitted to firing a single shot later during the incident when Vang, noticing that Hesebeck was still alive, fired at him again. Hesebeck testified no shot was fired before Vang started shooting. Additional forensic analysis of Willers' gun was not performed by the local law enforcement which caused the court to take a break from trial. The statements of both Vang and Hesebeck state that Vang removed the scope from his rifle before firing his first shot. Vang stated that race was a factor, alleging that during the verbal dispute, some of the local hunters yelled out racial slurs at him such as "chink" and "gook". On the stand, Hesebeck admitted that Robert Crotteau had called Vang a "Hmong asshole." Hesebeck also admitted that he told law enforcement that Robert Crotteau had problems with trespassers in the past, specifically citing Hmong hunters, who often travel to Wisconsin from Minnesota to hunt. The term "Mud Duck" is often used in western Wisconsin to refer to Minnesota residents, similar to "Cheesehead" being used to describe Wisconsin residents. Willers used this term to describe Chai Vang when he radioed back to the cabin. Though the term does not necessarily have a racial connotation, the defense argued that it did, due to the fact that Willers and the others did not know at the time that Vang was from Minnesota.

The criminal complaint states that Vang shot four of the victims in the back, and Vang himself admits he shot one victim in the back. He also shot many of them multiple times. The prosecution made use of these facts in arguing against the claim of self-defense.

== Trial ==
The trial of Chai Soua Vang began Saturday, September 10, 2005, at the Sawyer County Courthouse in Hayward. Due to pre-trial publicity within the Twin Cities and Duluth-Superior media markets, twelve jurors and two alternates were selected from Dane County, and transported by bus approximately 280 miles (450 km) northwest to Sawyer County, where they were sequestered.

Vang told the jury he feared for his life and began firing only after another hunter's shot nearly hit him. He detailed for the jurors how the other hunters approached him, and how he responded by shooting at each one. He says he shot two of the victims in the back because they were "disrespectful." He recounted with clarity how he killed each victim. While saying on the stand, "(he wished) it wasn't happening," Vang contended that three of the hunters deserved to die:

"Did Mr. [Robert] Crotteau deserve to die?" Wisconsin Attorney General Peg Lautenschlager asked.

"Yes," Chai Soua Vang replied.

Vang further testified that Joseph Crotteau "deserved to die" because he accused Vang of giving him the finger and "tried to cut in front of me to stop me from leaving", further saying that Alan Laski had provoked him by using a gun to threaten his life. Vang re-enacted his deeds while on the stand, using his hands and arms to imitate the motions of firing a rifle. Vang's lawyers commented that some of his abnormal remarks were due to the language barrier. Therefore, when Vang responded affirmatively to the question that the Crotteaus and Laski "deserved to die," he had misunderstood Lautenschlager's question and had meant that the men contributed to the circumstances that led to their deaths.

On September 16, 2005, Chai Soua Vang was found guilty of all six charges of first degree intentional homicide and three charges of attempted homicide. Vang's public defender, Steve Kohn, noted that Vang faced verbal abuse and racial epithets in his confrontation with the hunters, and that the jury selected for the trial was all White, despite the jury selection pool including minorities. On November 8, 2005, he was sentenced to six consecutive life terms plus seventy years (forty for two counts of attempted homicide plus five additional years for each count of homicide in the first degree); a sentence of life without parole. At the time, Wisconsin was one of 12 states in the United States that did not have the death penalty.

=== Imprisonment and death ===
Vang was originally incarcerated at Dodge Correctional Institutition, but temporarily transferred to Anamosa State Penitentiary in 2006 for safety reasons over "racial concerns". Between April 2025 and May 2026, he was imprisoned at Oshkosh Correctional Institution.

On June 10, 2026, Vang died after being hospitalized. He had been placed in a supervised living facility two weeks earlier on May 27. Wisconsin Circuit Court Access publicly announced his death on June 12.

== See also ==
- List of homicides in Wisconsin
- List of rampage killers in the United States
- List of Hmong Americans

== Sources ==
- Ashley H. Grant (November 24, 2004). "Shooting suspect had Army sharpshooting badge," Duluth News Tribune/Associated Press. Accessed November 27, 2004.
- "Victims in the Shootings That Killed Six Deer Hunters," Duluth News Tribune/Associated Press. Posted on Sep. 04, 2005.
- Kevin Harter "Vang Tells His Story," Pioneer Press, (September 16, 2005).
- "Hmong Hunters Are Up For a New Season," Asian Week, (November 11, 2005).
