= Alfred Kunz =

Alfred Kunz may refer to:

- Alfred Kunz (Catholic priest) (1931–1998), Catholic priest murdered in his church in Dane, Wisconsin
- Alfred Kunz (composer) (1929–2019), German-Canadian composer, conductor, and arts administrator
