= Waupun Correctional Institution =

- Interactive map of Waupun Correctional Institution
- Location: Waupun, Wisconsin; 43.629599°N 88.731401°W
- Status: Operational
- Security class: Maximum
- Capacity: 1064 males (operating)
- Population: 965 males (FY 2022-23)
- Opened: 1851
- Managed by: Wisconsin Department of Corrections; Division of Adult Institutions
- Warden: Kenya Mason

- Wisconsin State Prison Historic District
- U.S. National Register of Historic Places
- U.S. Historic district
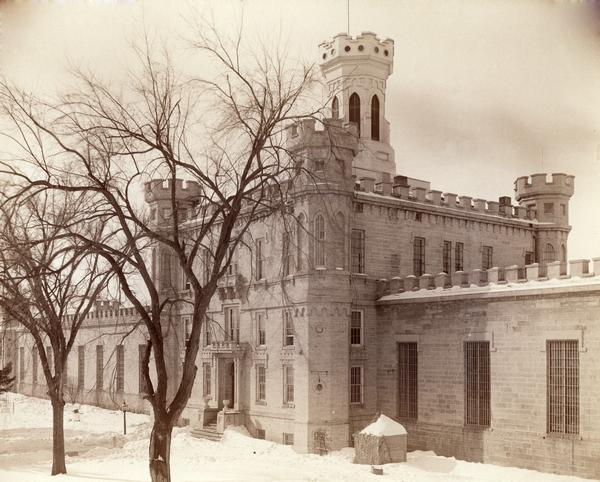
- Photographed by H. H. Bennett in 1893

- Location within Wisconsin Location within the United States
- Location: 200 S. Madison St; Waupun, Wisconsin
- Built: 1854
- Architectural style: Gothic Revival
- NRHP reference No.: 91001994
- Added to NRHP: January 22, 1992

The Waupun Correctional Institution is a maximum security penitentiary in Waupun, Wisconsin. The prison is under the command of Warden Bradley Mlodzik. It was renamed from Waupun State Prison to Waupun Correctional Institution in 1977.

== History ==
On July 4, 1851, Governor Nelson Dewey selected the Waupun area to be the site of the Wisconsin State Prison. A temporary structure opened in 1851. It could hold a maximum of 40 inmates, and was intended to be used only until the completion of a wing of the main prison. By December 31, 1852, 27 inmates were held there. The first permanent building was completed in 1854, and is still in use today as the South Cell Hall. According to the Commissioner of the State Prison, it was to be constructed of stone using prison labor. Additions were made over the years in 1855, 1906, 1913, 1940, and 1998. The prison was added to the National Register of Historic Places as the "Wisconsin State Prison Historic District" in 1992.

=== 18th Biennial Report ===
In 1918, Warden Henry Town reported a decrease in the prison population over a two-year period. The number had dropped from 906 in 1916 to 853 in 1918. Between 20 and 30 percent of that number were employed outside of the prison. They lived in bunkhouses or at a residence at one of the prison's farms. Foreman and superintendents supervised their work instead of armed guards, but nine prisoners did escape, with only two being apprehended. In the spring and summer of 1917, the prison operated six road construction camps with approximately 15 workers per camp. Prisoners were also assigned to construction projects, such as the Industrial Home for Women at Taycheedah and the Southern Wisconsin Home for the Feeble Minded and Epileptic at Union Grove, Wisconsin. In 1918, the prison did not assign any men for road work. Instead, more were scheduled for farm labor to support the war effort. The Wisconsin State Prison operated a number of farms as part of its rehabilitation program for prisoners. It owned 367 acres of land in the town of Chester, 400 acres in the town of Trenton, and rented 960 acres with another 657 acres arranged to be rented by October 1, 1918. Total farm revenues reported on June 30, 1918, were $32,151.84, which was used to offset the costs of running the prison. The prison also operated a cannery for the farm products, a shoe factory, and planned to construct a license plate factory.

=== 26th Biennial Report ===
26 years later, Warden Oscar Lee reported that as of June 30, 1934, the male population of the prison increased to 1664 inmates, with 438 of them assigned to work outside the prison. Ten outdoor camps were in operation, three of them logging operations. Lee argued that "The value to the inmates, both physical and mental, because of the fresh air and sunshine, the clean, wholesome outdoor work, and the semi-freedom of the camps, cannot be estimated in dollars and cents." He also reported that the prison began using less harsh punishment for violating rules. Prisoners were no longer handcuffed to cell doors. Lee boasted that "Corporal punishment is a thing of the past, stripes and red uniforms following suit." Likewise, enhanced opportunities to earn an education were also reported. By 1934, inmates could attend class 40 hours per week at eight hours per day. 148 men enrolled, and a University of Wisconsin employee directed the educational system there. Teachers were from the prison population. A new apprenticeship program was also initiated that combined school work with work in the machine and sheet metal shops. Twenty inmates enrolled, and they spent half their day in a shop and the other half in school. Prison guards worked between 11 and 12 hours per shift, and Warden Lee proposed to have that number reduced to eight.

=== 2023-2024 Inmate Deaths ===
In June, 2024, nine prison employees, including former warden Randall Hepp, were charged with felony crimes in Dodge County related to the abuse and deaths of inmates at the prison over the previous 12 months. The charges were specifically related to the deaths of inmates Donald Maier and Cameron Williams. The Dodge County Sheriff's Office also investigated the deaths of inmates Tyshun Lemons and Dean Hoffmann during the same period but declined to bring charges. A fifth death, that of inmate Christopher McDonald, was reported on August 5, 2024.

== Notable inmates ==
- Steven Avery - Found guilty of killing Teresa Halbach in 2005; Netflix series Making a Murderer depicted his conviction and appeal process.
- James Anthony Frederick - Serving a 97-year sentence for armed robbery, possession of a firearm by a felon, and reckless injury.
- Gary Hirte - Convicted of murdering Glen Kopitske in 2003.
- Aaron Schaffhausen - Serving three life sentences without parole for murdering his three daughters in 2012.
- John Flammang Schrank - Attempted presidential assassin of President Theodore Roosevelt.
- Gerald M. Turner (nicknamed "The Halloween Killer") - Convicted of raping and murdering 9-year-old trick-or-treater, Lisa Ann French in 1973, Imprisoned in Waupun Correctional Institution from 1975 to 1992.
- David Van Dyke - Serial killer who murdered six people in Milwaukee between 1979 and 1980.

== Other information ==
In 2001, the warden hired the first Pagan priestess to serve as one of the institution's two acting chaplains.

Don Gorske, who holds the Guinness World Record for the most Big Macs eaten in a lifetime, was a corrections officer at the prison from 1986 to 2011.

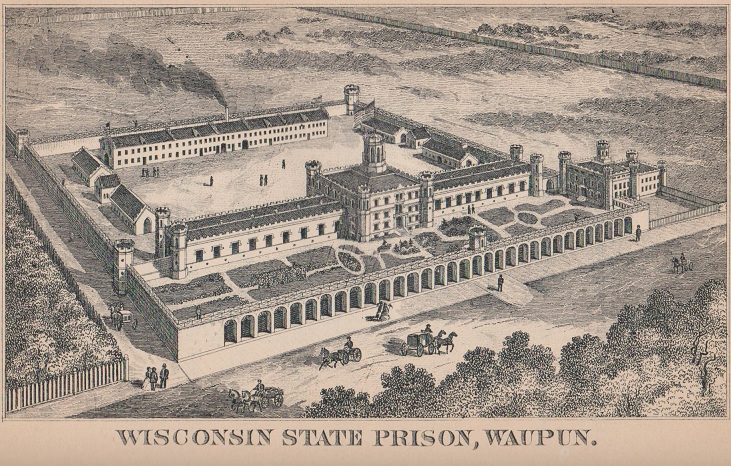
An illustration of the Waupun facility, from the 1885 edition of the Wisconsin Blue Book.

== See also ==
- List of Wisconsin state prisons
