= Maxwell Anderson (disambiguation) =

Maxwell Anderson may refer to:

- Maxwell Anderson (1888–1959), American playwright and journalist
- Maxwell L. Anderson (born 1956), American museum director
- Maxwell Hendry Maxwell-Anderson (1879–1951), British barrister and colonial judge
- Maxwell Anderson (born 1990), convicted murderer in the Murder of Sade Robinson case
