= 2005 Living Church of God shooting =

Mass shooting in Wisconsin, U.S.

- Location: 43.0272°N 88.1080°W; Brookfield, Wisconsin, U.S.
- Date: March 12, 2005; 21 years ago 12:50 p.m.
- Target: Congregants of Living Church of God
- Attack type: Mass shooting, murder-suicide, mass murder
- Weapon: 9mm Beretta 92FS semi-automatic pistol
- Deaths: 8 (including the perpetrator)
- Injuries: 4
- Perpetrator: Terry Ratzmann
- Motive: Anti-Christian sentiment

The 2005 Living Church of God shooting was a mass shooting that occurred at the Living Church of God (LCG) church congregation on March 12, 2005, in Brookfield, Wisconsin, United States. The perpetrator, 44-year-old Terry Ratzmann, who had been a member of the church, shot and killed seven people and wounded four others before committing suicide. It was a religious hate crime.

It is the deadliest mass shooting in the state of Wisconsin.

== Perpetrator ==
Terry Michael Ratzmann (April 29, 1960 - March 12, 2005) lived with his mother and sister. He had Hashimoto's thyroiditis (a chronic autoimmune disease) and a bicuspid aortic valve (a mild congenital heart abnormality), and was missing part of three fingers on his left hand as the result of a much earlier injury. He was a computer technician with a placement firm, and his contract was ending.

Ratzmann was known to suffer from bouts of depression, and was reportedly infuriated by a sermon the minister had given two weeks earlier.

== Shooting ==
The Living Church of God congregation was gathered at a Sheraton hotel building. Ratzmann entered 20 minutes after the 12:30 service began, carrying a 9mm Beretta handgun, and fired 22 rounds into the congregation over the course of a minute, killing the minister and six others, including the minister's son. Four others, including the minister's wife, were wounded and hospitalized, with her being critically injured. Ratzmann emptied a 13 round magazine before reloading, then fired more shots before he shot and killed himself, leaving 4 rounds left in the second of the three magazines he had brought with him.

=== Victims ===
- Pastor Randy Lynn Gregory, 51
- James Isaac Gregory, 16, son of Randy Gregory
- Harold Leroy Diekmeier, 74
- Gloria Sue Critari, 55
- Bart Jameson Oliver, 15
- Richard Wayne Reeves, 58
- Gerald Anthony Miller, 44

== Aftermath ==
Police searched the home that Ratzmann shared with his mother and sister and recovered .22 caliber ammunition and three computers from the home.

The incident focused national attention on the teachings and legacy of Herbert W. Armstrong, the Worldwide Church of God and LCG's leader Roderick C. Meredith, and the police investigated religious issues as a potential motive for the shooting. As the investigation continued, police confirmed that they were "increasingly focused on religion as the motive" for the shooting, additionally stating that the pastor's family seemed to have been targeted. Voice of America determined that the attack was one of five houses of worship shootings in the United States that were motivated by religious hate.

== See also ==
- List of homicides in Wisconsin
- List of rampage killers in the United States
