= Don Gorske =

American Big Mac enthusiast

- Born: Donald Gorske; 1953 or 1954 (age 72–73); Green Bay, Wisconsin, U.S.
- Occupation: Corrections officer
- Known for: Record holder of having eaten the most Big Macs
- Spouse: Mary (m. 1976)
- Children: 1

Donald Gorske (born 1953 or 1954) is an American man who holds the Guinness world record for having eaten the most McDonald's Big Mac hamburgers, at over 35,000.

== Big Macs ==
On May 17, 1972, after getting his first car, Gorske visited the McDonald's on Military Road in his hometown of Fond du Lac, Wisconsin, eating 5 Big Macs that day. He has eaten a Big Mac almost every day since then, eating his 25,000th Big Mac in 2011, his 30,000th in 2018, and his 35,000th in 2025. He has missed eight days in that span due to bad weather, work and family obligations, and consequently keeps a home stash of frozen Big Macs for emergencies. "I love Big Macs so much I'll keep eating them until I die," he said in 2018. "If I live as long as my dad I'll pass 40,000." His favorite food other than Big Macs used to be lobster, but in 2024, Gorske said the last time he ate it was "over 28 years ago." As of March 2024, he has eaten a Big Mac at every MLB ballpark, NFL stadium, and NASCAR stadium.

Gorske entered the public eye due to his appearance in Morgan Spurlock's 2004 film Super Size Me, which explored the negative consequences of fast food.

== Health ==
A 2018 profile listed Gorske as 6 feet 2 inches (188 cm) tall and 195 pounds (88 kg), with a below-average cholesterol level. He says he maintains a stable weight by consuming fewer calories than the average American, skipping breakfast, and walking 6 miles (9.7 km) daily and typically does not order sides. Aside from Big Macs, the only other food he eats is a small evening snack such as ice cream, fruit bars, or potato chips. He attributes his Big Mac devotion to obsessive–compulsive disorder, noting that he catalogs all his McDonald's receipts and keeps a detailed log of all Big Macs eaten.

== Personal life ==
Gorske was born in Green Bay, Wisconsin. He met his wife Mary in 1973, later proposing to her in a McDonald's parking lot in 1976 and eating a Big Mac before the start of their wedding that December. The couple has a son together.

Gorske was employed as a corrections officer at Waupun Correctional Institution for 25 years before retiring in 2011.
