= Crandon shooting =

2007 mass shooting in Crandon, Wisconsin

Coordinates: 45°34′13″N 88°54′18″W

- Location: Crandon, Wisconsin, U.S.
- Date: October 7, 2007 c. 2:45 a.m. (CDT; UTC−5)
- Target: Crandon High School students and recent graduates
- Attack type: Mass murder, mass shooting, murder-suicide
- Weapons: Bushmaster XM-15 AR-15 style rifle; .40 caliber Glock 22 semi-automatic pistol
- Deaths: 7 (including the perpetrator)
- Injuries: 1
- Perpetrator: Tyler James Peterson
- Motive: Relationship dispute (suspected)

The Crandon shooting was a mass shooting that occurred about 2:45 a.m. CDT on October 7, 2007, at a post-homecoming party inside a duplex in Crandon, Wisconsin, United States. The perpetrator, 20-year-old Tyler James Peterson, who was a full-time deputy in the Forest County Sheriff's Department and a part-time officer with the Crandon Police Department, shot and killed six people and critically injured a seventh before committing suicide. One of the victims, 18-year-old Jordanne Michele Murray, was Peterson's former girlfriend, and it was believed that a dispute within the apartment motivated the shooting.

The incident was retroactively identified as the first time an AR-15 style rifle was used in a mass shooting in the U.S., according to Mother Jones' mass shooting database; AR-15s have been used in mass shootings at increasing rates since the Crandon shooting. (Note: A Colt AR-15 Sporter was first used in a mass shooting by Dewitt Henry, the killer in the mass shooting at Uncle Albert's Lounge in Klamath Falls, Oregon on July 23, 1977. AR-15s were also used by Alvin King in 1980 and Carl Drega in 1997. Data Source: The Violence Project Mass Shooter Database, Version 8.)

== Overview ==
Peterson, who was not on duty at the time of the shooting, entered an apartment complex where a homecoming party was held at approximately 2:30 a.m. CDT. There, he argued with the seven people inside before going back to his car to retrieve his rifle. He kicked down the door and killed three people in the living room, then killed one in the kitchen, one outside a closet, and one inside a closet. The last victim to be shot was Charlie Neitzel. He fell in the kitchen after being shot, and then asked the shooter to stop shooting before attempting to take the gun away. The shooter shot him a second time, after which Neitzel played dead, and was then shot a third time. Neitzel survived.

Peterson went outside, where he saw officer Greg Carter, who did not initially suspect Peterson of being the shooter, driving towards the scene. Peterson sprayed gunfire at Carter's windshield, wounding him with flying glass. Carter lay sideways and put his vehicle in reverse. Peterson then fled the scene.

Peterson drove aimlessly and called in false reports of his location. He was confronted by authorities at a friend's cabin seven miles to the north in Argonne later that day. He held his friends hostage until 12:30 p.m., which is when he attempted to run off into the woods. His cause of death was initially believed to have been from a gunshot fired by a police sniper, but it was later discovered that he committed suicide by multiple gunshots. Peterson was shot in the left arm bicep by a police sniper, and then he shot himself three times with his Glock, twice under the chin, and once to the side of his head. Police have determined that approximately 30 rounds were fired from the rifle throughout the duration of the apartment shooting.

== Victims ==
All victims were either students or recent graduates of Crandon High School. One victim played dead after being shot three times and survived.

Fatalities:

- Aaron Smith, 20
- Bradley Schultz, 20
- Jordanne Michele Murray, 18
- Katrina McCorkle, 17
- Lianna Thomas, 17
- Lindsey Stahl, 14
- Tyler James Peterson, 20 (Perpetrator)

Survivors:

- Charlie Neitzel, 21

== Perpetrator ==
Tyler James Peterson (March 6, 1987 – October 7, 2007) He graduated from Crandon High School in 2005. He was hired as a full-time police officer on September 11, 2006. He and Murray broke up the month before the shooting, after dating for 4 years.

== Aftermath ==
Charlie Neitzel was discharged from the hospital on October 17, 2007.

The house where the murders took place was later demolished in June 2008.

Families of the victims filed a lawsuit against the city, claiming that the city was neglectful for giving Peterson access to weapons and never making him undergo a mental assessment to become an officer. A judge dismissed the suit and ordered the families to pay $21,000 for legal fees.

== See also ==
- List of homicides in Wisconsin
- List of rampage killers in the United States
