= Murder of Alfred Kunz =

Catholic priest murdered in Wisconsin, US

Father Alfred Kunz

The Rev. Alfred Joseph Kunz (April 15, 1930 – March 4, 1998) was a Traditionalist Catholic priest who was found with his throat slit in the hallway of St. Michael School in Dane, Wisconsin.

Kunz was known for celebrating the Traditional Latin Mass as well as the Mass in English and was in communion with his diocesan bishop. "Father Kunz was a well-known expert in canon law, so he knew how to walk the lines," Bill Brophy, a spokesman for the Diocese of Madison, Wisconsin said shortly after his murder. Kunz was pastor at the church for 32 years before his death.

In 2019, the Kunz case was featured on the Unsolved III: The Devil You Know podcast, a project of the Milwaukee Journal Sentinel. In 2022, the case was featured in an episode of the HLN (owned by CNN) original series Real Life Nightmare with Paul Holes.

Former Dane County Sheriff Dave Mahoney said in a March 2023 interview: "At some point in time, [the killer needs] to resolve it in their own soul and own mind and come forward. It resonates and haunts, if you will, myself and many, many others who want this resolved, and I look forward to the day that it can be resolved, and I'll sleep better."

In 2024, Detective Gwen Ruppert of the Dane County Sheriff's Office revealed to Catholic commentator Matt C. Abbott that in addition to having his throat slit, Kunz was stabbed (fewer than 10 times). She also revealed that a partial DNA sample discovered in the early 2010s after forensic evidence was retested has been used to eliminate several persons of interest thus far. The Sheriff's Office is confident the DNA sample belongs to the killer. Ruppert expressed how difficult a case such as this one is to solve: "This is the hardest type of 'who-dun-it' case for law enforcement: a solitary man, with no—or very limited—witnesses to his life. No calendar, no phone, not married, no close family. Someone who had to live his life in privacy while keeping the secrets of others." The Sheriff's Office is still seeking tips from the public.

== See also ==
- List of homicides in Wisconsin
