= Murder of Cha Vang =

2007 murder in Wisconsin

- Location: Woods near Peshtigo, Wisconsin, U.S.
- Date: January 5, 2007
- Attack type: Murder by shooting and stabbing
- Weapons: Shotgun; Knife
- Motive: Anti-Asian racism
- Charges: Intentional homicide Hiding a corpse Felony possession of a firearm
- Verdict: Guilty
- Convictions: Second-degree intentional homicide Hiding a corpse Felony possession of a firearm

On January 5, 2007, 30-year-old Cha Vang was murdered by 28-year-old James Nichols near Peshtigo, Wisconsin, United States. Nichols had shot and stabbed Vang before hiding his body, later admitting to the murder, but insisting the killing was self-defense. Prosecutors believed that Vang's murder had been racially motivated.

In October 2007, Nichols was convicted of second degree intentional homicide and sentenced to 69 years in prison.

== Background ==
Cha Vang was born on 15 June 1976 in Laos, but spent most of his life in a refugee camp in Thailand due to the Laotian Civil War. He immigrated to the U.S. in mid-2004, settling in Green Bay, Wisconsin. He worked at a factory and was the father of five children.

James Allen Nichols was born on May 27, 1978 and worked at a sawmill in Peshtigo. He had previously been convicted of burglary and on parole at the time of the murder. In October 2006, Nichols proclaimed a hatred for Hmong immigrants to his boss. He alleged that a different Hmong hunter had stolen a tree stand and stated that he would have murdered the hunter, had Nichols been in possession of his rifle instead of a bow.

== Murder ==
On January 5, 2007, Cha Vang was with a larger group of squirrel hunters from Green Bay, who went to different parts of the forest on their own. He was eventually spotted by Nichols, who was also in the woods hunting squirrels. Mark Witeck, who performed the autopsy on Cha Vang, testified that Vang was shot from about 50 feet away by a shotgun, and stabbed six times in his face and neck. Vang's body was then hidden under a log.

On January 6, Nichols arrived at a hospital with a gunshot wound to his hand, claiming a stranger had shot at him from a distance with a .22 caliber. When asked why he had not called police, Nichols changed his initial explanation and led emergency services to where he had hidden Vang's remains.

== Investigation ==
Attention to possible racial motives has been brought due to some of Nichols' own statements. Nichols has been quoted on record saying Hmong people are bad, mean and "kill everything and that they go for anything that moves."

Nichols after his arrest

=== Trial ===
On March 19, 2007, Nichols pleaded not guilty to the charges of first degree intentional homicide, felony possession of a weapon, and hiding a corpse. On October 6, 2007, a jury found Nichols guilty of a lesser charge of second degree intentional homicide and sentenced him to 69 years in prison. "The message sent to the Hmong community is that someone can shoot a Hmong hunter and not get the maximum sentence," said Tou Ger Xiong, spokesman for the Coalition for Community Relations in St. Paul, Minnesota.

== Effects of the killing ==
Reports of racial tension in the forests of Wisconsin during hunting seasons had been reported since Chai Soua Vang (no relation), a Hmong hunter, was convicted of killing six white hunters two years before Cha Vang's murder. Besides the immediate effects felt by family and friends at the death of Cha Vang, the killing stressed the already-tense relations between the Hmong community and predominantly white hunters in northern Wisconsin.
