= George Lamar Jones =

American serial killer

- Born: 1945; Mississippi, U.S.
- Died: April 30, 2012 (aged 67); Dodge Correctional Institution, Waupun, Wisconsin, U.S.
- Other names: "Mule"; George Lee Jones
- Convictions: Mississippi: Manslaughter; Wisconsin: First degree intentional homicide First degree reckless homicide
- Penalty: Mississippi: 5 years imprisonment Wisconsin: Life sentence without the possibility of parole 30 years

Details
- Victims: 3+
- Span of crimes: 1972–1997
- Country: United States
- States: Mississippi, Wisconsin
- Date apprehended: For the final time on November 24, 1997

George Lamar Jones (1945 – April 30, 2012) was an American serial killer who killed at least two women in Milwaukee, Wisconsin, from 1993 to 1997, following his release from prison for a 1972 murder in Mississippi. Coincidentally, his latter crimes occurred at the same time as those of Walter E. Ellis, another unrelated serial killer. For his respective crimes, Jones was convicted and sentenced to life imprisonment, remaining behind bars until his death in 2012.

== First murder ==
Little is known of Jones' personal life prior to his first major crime, that being the murder of a woman named Correne Jones on June 10, 1972. He was initially indicted for murder by the circuit court in Greenwood, Mississippi under the alias 'George Lee Jones', which meant that he faced a possible sentence of 20 years imprisonment. In order to avoid this, his attorney presented evidence that Jones suffered from epilepsy from birth and that this affected his behavior at the time of the crime. Because of this, prosecutors offered a plea bargain that allowed him to plead guilty to the lesser charge of manslaughter and be sentenced to five years in prison instead.

After serving out his sentence in full, Jones was released and later moved to Milwaukee, Wisconsin. While living there, he developed an addiction to drugs and amassed numerous convictions for a variety of offenses. During the times he was not incarcerated, Jones took odd jobs as a handyman and would spend his free time in the company of prostitutes.

== Murder of Shameika Carter ==
=== Arrest and investigation ===
From 1986 to 2007, a number of young women and teenagers, most of whom were either prostitutes or drug addicts, were raped and strangled to death in Milwaukee. Suspecting that this might be the work of a serial killer, the local police department partnered up with the FBI to seek for potential links between the cases.

One of the cases put under investigation was that of 24-year-old Shameika Carter, a prostitute whose body was found dumped on a pile of garbage on November 19, 1997. Five days later, Jones was identified as the prime suspect in her killing and was arrested for her murder, but police refused to disclose his identity for the first two days as they were investigating him for any potential links to the other murders. Investigators determined that since his release from prison on November 14, Jones had managed to assault two other women in addition to killing Carter, but ruled him out as a suspect in some of the other murders due to the fact he was imprisoned at the time.

When interviewed by investigators, Jones claimed that he first met Carter at the house of a drug dealer where he usually bought crack cocaine. He claimed that she offered to accompany him to a place where they could buy some marijuana, and that the pair later returned to his house to smoke it. Jones then claimed that after refusing to have sex with her, the two started smoking the marijuana mixed in with the cocaine, which made him have a headache. This, coupled with the fact that Carter supposedly mocked him for his apparent inability to get sexually aroused, made him snap and attack her, resulting in Carter being choked to death. Following these confessions, Jones was charged with first-degree murder, and his bail was set at $500,000.

=== Trial, sentence, and imprisonment ===
Before he was put on trial, Jones' court-appointed attorney announced that he intended to plead insanity on his client's behalf, citing his client's lifelong epilepsy and its success in the manslaughter case as his reasoning to do so. This was contested by the prosecutors, who pointed out that Jones was intelligent enough to lie when he took a lie detector test. In order to determine whether he was capable of standing trial, he was ordered to undergo a psychiatric evaluation, with one of his examiners being George Palermo, who had also examined Jeffrey Dahmer. After being deemed sane, both Jones and his attorney were prohibited from discussing the case with the media, as Justice Diane Syes claimed that the publicity would make jury selection difficult.

While he awaited charges for Carter's murder, authorities revealed that Jones was considered a possible suspect in three additional murders: the February 1990 murder of Vernell Jeter; the September 1993 murder of Mary Lee Harris and the 1992 murder of Joyce Mims. Unsealed documents showed that Jones acknowledged his sexual encounters with Jeter and Mims, but denied killing them or meeting Harris, whose body was found in a trash container near his house.

In July 1998, Jones pleaded no-contest to the murder charges, claiming that he "[would] not make it through trial" and just wanted to get it over with. As a result, he was subsequently sentenced to life imprisonment without parole. He later appealed the decision on the grounds that the arresting offices had supposedly detained for an unreasonable length of time following his arrest, but this was promptly dismissed by the courts in 2001.

== Link to previous murder and death ==
In March 2010, Jones' DNA was linked to the murder of Harris after a cold case review was conducted by the Milwaukee Police Department. During an interview with the detectives, he recanted his previous claims and admitted that he had invited Harris to smoke crack at his house. While doing this, Jones claimed that he had told her that she talked too fast and should slow down, which angered Harris and quickly escalated into a physical confrontation. After overpowering her, he proceeded to choke her for approximately 15 minutes before letting go. Upon realizing that he had killed her, Jones then panicked, rolled a garbage cart inside his house and dumped her body inside before rolling it back to the nearby apartment building, where it was picked up by sanitation workers not long after. Soon after, he was charged with first-degree reckless homicide in relation to Harris' death.

After being successfully convicted and given an additional 30-year term, Jones continued to serve his life sentence at the Dodge Correctional Institution in Waupun until his death from natural causes on April 30, 2012. For a brief period, his death was erroneously attributed to Walter E. Ellis, who became notorious as "The Milwaukee North Side Strangler" after DNA evidence linked him to the majority of the murders committed from the period of 1986 to 2007.

As of March 2025, no further victims have been linked to Jones. The Mims homicide was solved and attributed to Ellis. Convicted murderer David W. Lewis was charged with reckless homicide in the Jeter case in 2009, but was acquitted in 2011.

== See also ==
- Walter E. Ellis
- List of serial killers in the United States
