= 2020 Milwaukee brewery shooting =

Mass shooting in Wisconsin, U.S.

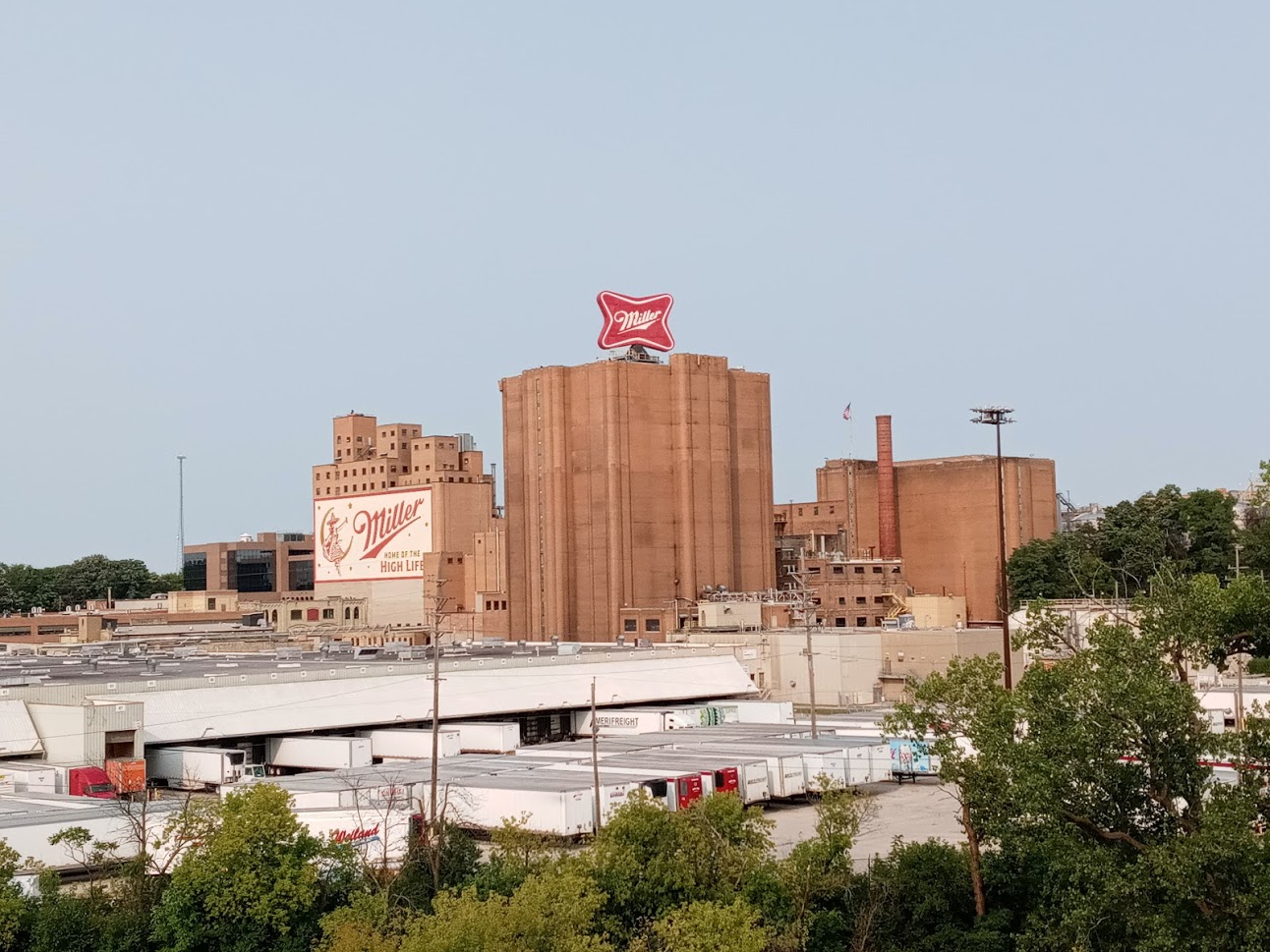
- The Miller brewery plant in September 2020
- Location: 43.0423°N 87.9650°W; Molson Coors Beverage Company, 4100 West State Street; Milwaukee, Wisconsin, U.S.
- Date: February 26, 2020; 6 years ago c. 2:10 p.m. (CST; UTC−06:00)
- Target: Employees
- Attack type: Workplace shooting, mass shooting, murder–suicide, mass murder
- Weapons: .45-caliber Springfield XD45 semi-automatic pistol; .40-caliber Walther P99C semi-automatic pistol
- Deaths: 6 (including the perpetrator)
- Perpetrator: Anthony Ferrill
- Motive: Unknown

On February 26, 2020, a mass shooting occurred at the Molson Coors Beverage Company in Milwaukee, Wisconsin, United States, at approximately 2:10 pm. The perpetrator, 51-year-old Anthony Ferrill, shot and killed five coworkers before committing suicide.

== Incident ==
=== Preceding hours ===
A worker of the Molson Coors Beverage Company told investigators that on the morning of the attack, at 7:00 a.m., the gunman, 51-year-old Anthony Ferrill, arrived for a maintenance planning meeting with colleagues on his electrician work detail, including four of the later victims: 57-year-old Dana Walk, 33-year-old Jesus Valle, 61-year-old Gennady Levshetz, and 60-year-old Dale Hudson, the latter of whom was described as one of his closest friends at the brewery. The meeting finished after fifteen minutes without incident. Between 1:15 and 1:30 p.m., during shift change, Ferrill entered the break room, where a fifth co-worker, 33-year-old Trevor Wetslaar, had arrived to take over for Valle as engine control room operator.

According to the witness, shortly before 2:00 p.m. he and Ferrill were talking about vacations when Ferrill invited Levshetz to join the conversation, acting normal until Valle walked past the group to the restroom. When Valle locked the door of his stall, Ferrill shook his head and remarked "What the fuck is his problem?". Shortly before the new work shift, Ferrill excused himself to make a phone call. Ferrill contacted daughter's school telling the staff to have the girl attend after-school care and that someone else would pick her up. The witness noted that Ferrill usually had a habit of clocking out on time to fetch his daughter right after classes end.

=== Shooting ===
Shortly after shift begin, Ferrill walked into the control room of Building 4 and killed Valle with four gunshots. The witness and Levshetz ran to the scene and found Ferrill standing in front of Valle's body before Ferrill turned around and waved at both men using both hands. Ferrill then walked off and killed Wetslaar. Levshetz, Walk, and Hudson were killed in and around the stairwell of Building 4. Ferrill returned to the control room, were he killed himself through a self-inflicted gunshot.

=== Emergency response ===
Milwaukee police responded to reports of a shooting at the company just before 2:10 pm, and the incident was handled as an active shooter situation The company used Twitter to announce the situation just before 2:30 pm. Following the shooting, agents with the Bureau of Alcohol, Tobacco, Firearms and Explosives (ATF) were dispatched to the scene, while a number of nearby schools and businesses were placed on lockdown. The brewery remained closed until March 2.

== Investigation ==
Initially, Ferrill was believed to be another victim, as the handgun was found on his chest rather than his hands. A 27-year-old co-worker, who had been reprimanded that day for behavioral issues, was initially named as a suspect because had made various threatening statements such as "I haven’t shot anyone today" and made note of the lack of metal detectors. The man was cleared twenty minutes after police arrival and Ferrill was correctly identified as the perpetrator.

Shortly after the shooting, reports emerged through an anonymous employee that the Coors brewery had a racist work environment, which media speculated may have factored into a motive for the shooting. In 2015, a noose was placed in Ferrill's locker. Ferrill and another worker, both Black, had previously complained about being called racial slurs and alleged that human resources ignored their concerns. Racism as a potential motive was discounted and it was noted that Ferrill was on friendly terms with some of the victims. However, he had recently come into conflict with supervisors after they told his co-workers about the death of Ferrill's brother without his agreement.

Milwaukee Police Chief Alfonso Morales stated that Ferrill was likely influenced by mental health issues. According to neighbors and co-workers, Ferrill displayed occasional odd behavior since 2017, following a three-month work lapse due to a shoulder injury. During this time, Ferrill claimed that "spies" were stalking him to ensure he was not faking his injury and that strange cars were parking around his house. Shortly after returning to work, Ferrill complained that someone had repeatedly broken into his locker, citing the low battery of a tablet he kept in his belongings. A request to have the lock of his office changed was denied. In 2018, Ferrill claimed an intruder had broken into his house and taken a sample of his fingerprint to use his electronic devices, after which Ferrill installed surveillance cameras around his property. In 2019, Ferrill had begun to claim that co-workers were moving furniture and using his computer at his home. The same year, Ferrill lost a substantial amount of weight through exercise and when a friend voiced concern for his health, Ferrill changed his diet to almost entirely pastries. He also made three hospital visits between 2017 and 2019, falsely claiming he had been poisoned. As of 2021, police had not identified a motive in the shooting.

== Reactions ==
The CEO of Molson Coors, Gavin Hattersley, wrote an email to all of the company's employees, in which he expressed his condolences and that the plant would remain temporarily closed "to ensure our people have time to cope with today's events".

Wisconsin governor Tony Evers said that the shooting was a "tragedy for the entire state of Wisconsin" and Milwaukee mayor Tom Barrett described the shooting as "an unspeakable tragedy for our city". In the immediate aftermath of the shooting, Senator Ron Johnson posted on Twitter that he was monitoring the "frightening situation at an iconic Milwaukee brewery". Senator Tammy Baldwin attended a vigil for the victims of the shooting where she said, "Tonight, we stand Milwaukee strong, inspired by the strength we find in each other and by the strength we gain by facing this tragedy of loss together".

President Donald Trump extended his condolences to those affected by the "wicked murderer".

== See also ==
- List of homicides in Wisconsin
- Workplace violence
