= Murder of Sade Robinson =

2024 dismemberment in Wisconsin, United States

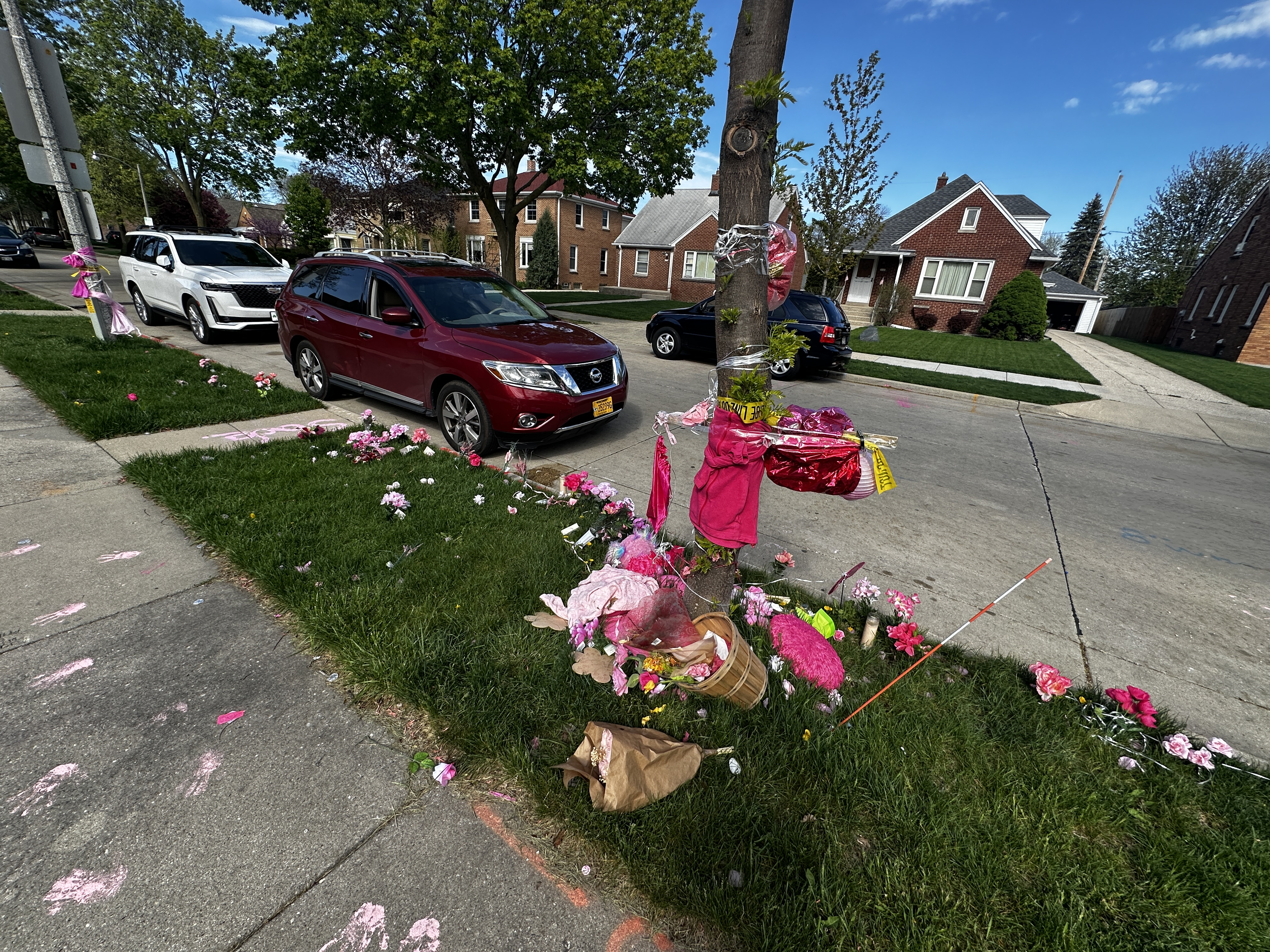
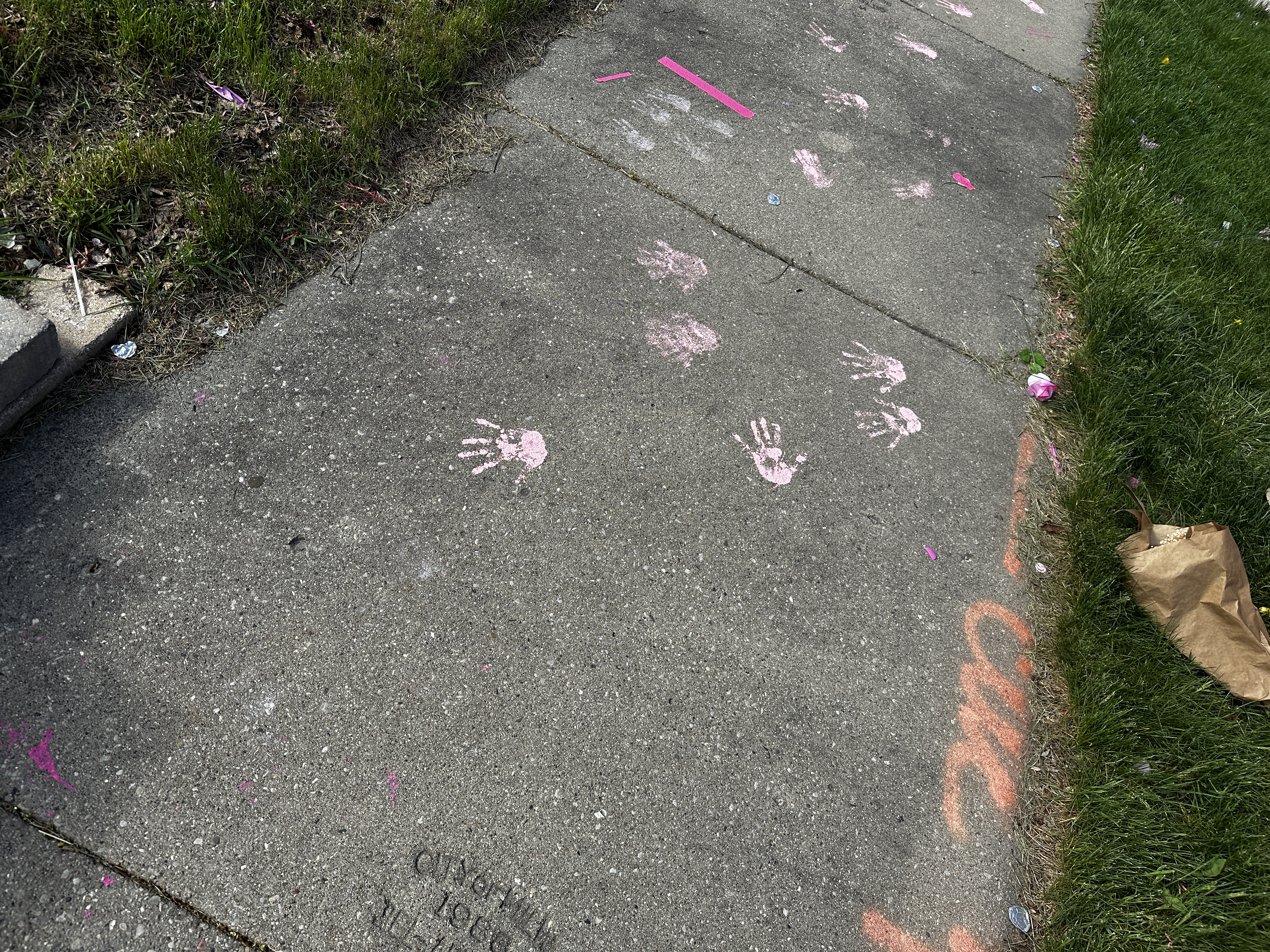
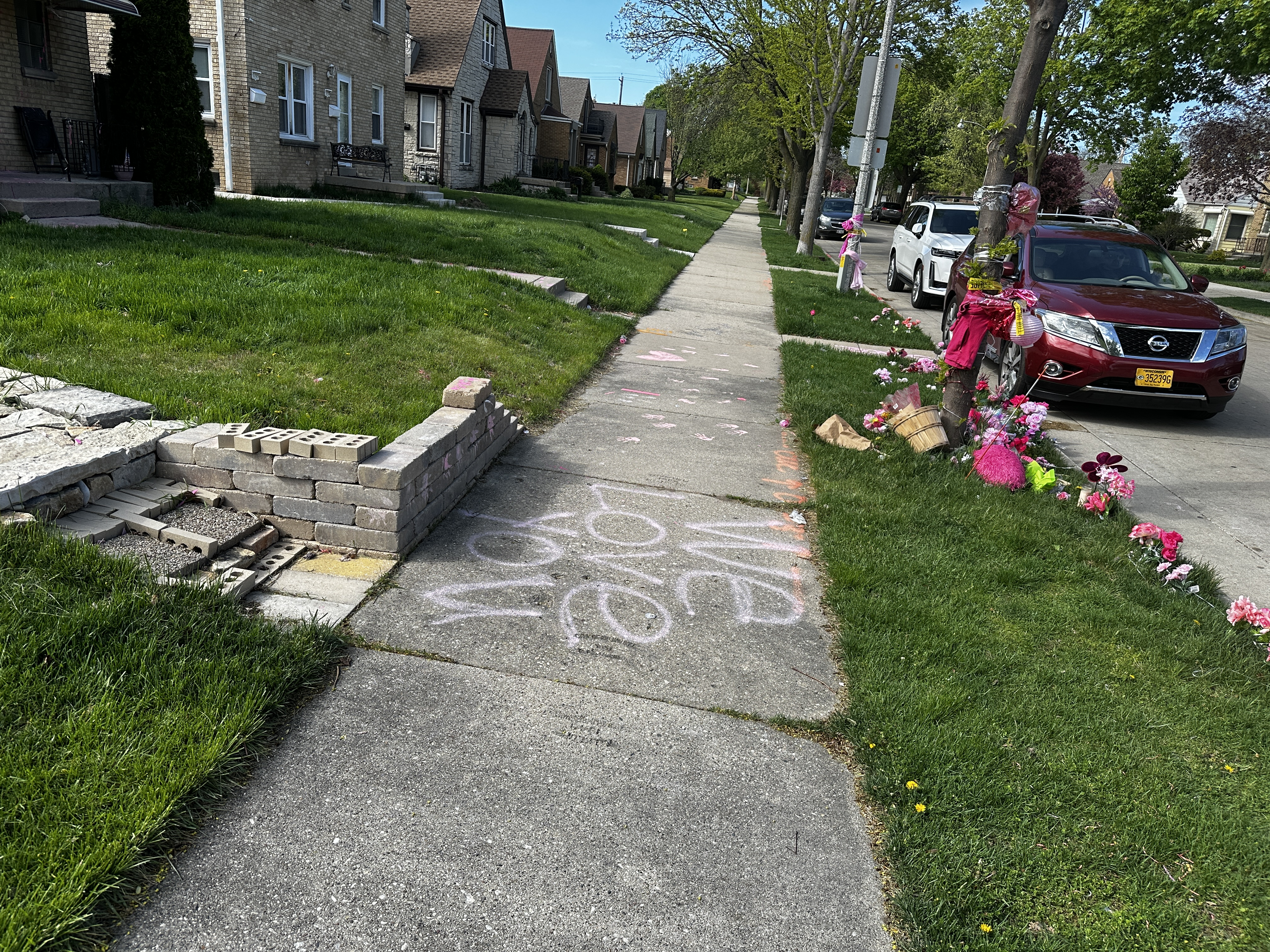
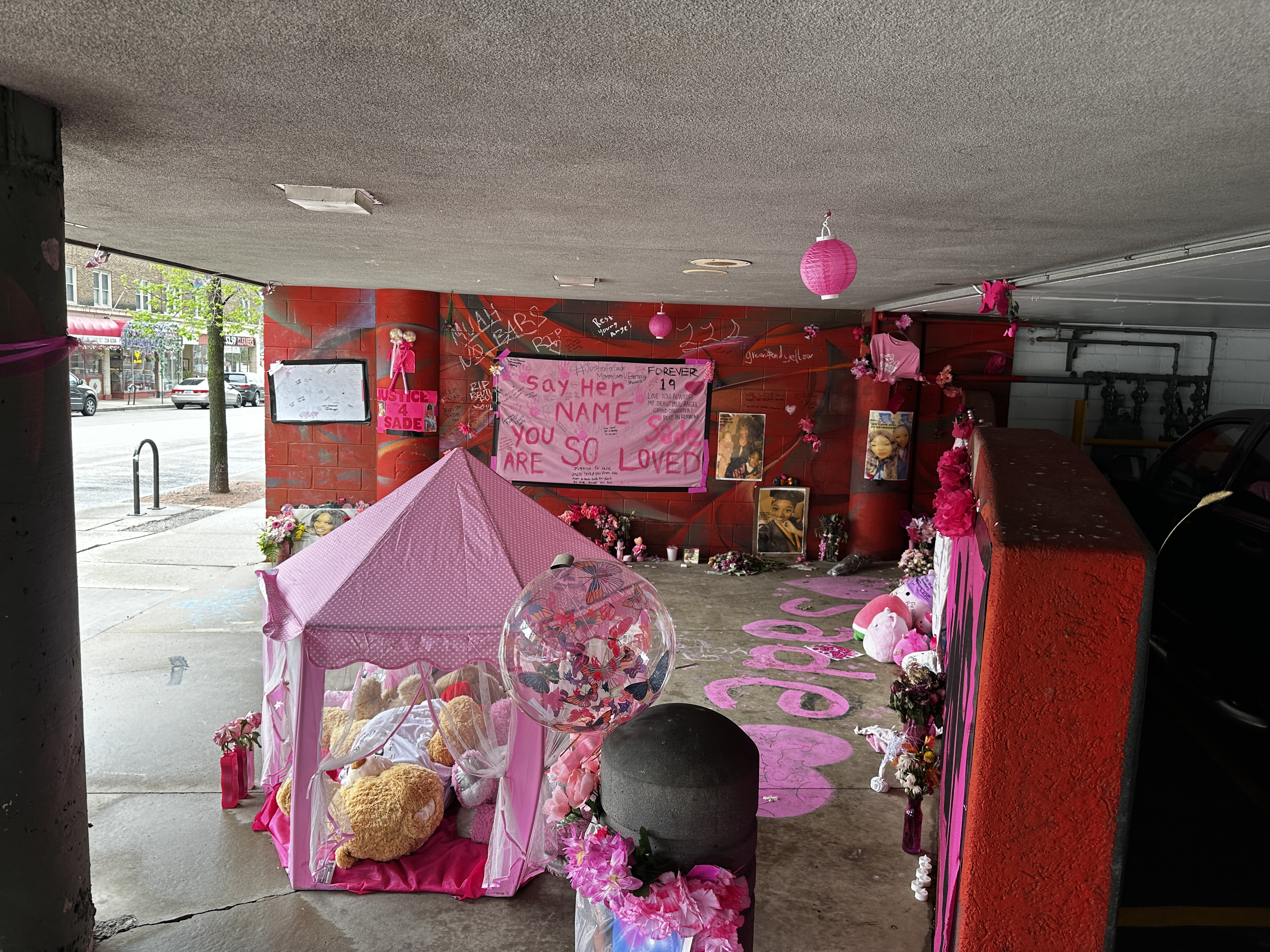
- Makeshift memorials to Robinson following the news of her death were made primarily with pink items because pink was her favorite color. Memorials were made at killer Maxwell Anderson's house (top right, top left, and bottom left) and at the Pizza Shuttle, the restaurant where Robinson was employed until her death (bottom right).
- Location: Milwaukee, Wisconsin, U.S.
- Date: April 1 or 2, 2024
- Attack type: Homicide and dismemberment
- Verdict: Guilty

Sade Carleena Robinson (May 10, 2004 – April 1 or 2, 2024) was a 19-year-old college student who was reported missing in Milwaukee, Wisconsin, on April 2, 2024. A severed human leg was found in a nearby park later that day, and subsequently determined by preliminary DNA testing to belong to Robinson. Other body parts were found in different locations later, and the search for remains continues.

== The suspect ==
A suspect, 33-year-old Maxwell Steven Anderson (born May 26, 1990), a longtime Waukesha County resident, was arrested on April 4 and held in custody until he was formally charged on April 12 with first-degree intentional homicide, mutilating a corpse, and arson. Anderson resided in Pewaukee, Wisconsin, throughout most of his life, and briefly served in the United States Navy from April 2011 to January 2012. The circumstances of his discharge remain unclear. In recent years prior to the murder, Anderson worked as a bartender at several Milwaukee establishments.

Before Robinson's death, she and Anderson were seen going on a date at a seafood restaurant where he used to work. Anderson had a past criminal record across both Waukesha County and Door County between 2014 and 2022, which includes domestic abuse, drunk driving, and disorderly conduct. When police searched Anderson's home, they reportedly found blood on the walls. The blood was tested, and it was determined that it was not Sade's blood and was later confirmed to be canine according to police reports.

On April 18, 2024, a passerby walking along a Lake Michigan beach found a torso and arm, which have been tested and confirmed to be Robinson's. Nearly a month after this, a human arm was discovered along the shoreline at the Waukegan Municipal Beach. The arm was confirmed to be Robinson's. Anderson's motive for killing Robinson remains unknown.

On June 6, 2025, a jury found Anderson guilty on all counts. On August 1, Anderson was sentenced to life in prison for the murder. Maxwell was incarcerated at Dodge Correctional Institution in Waupun, but has since been relocated to an undisclosed location out of state, due to safety reasons.

== Responses ==
The lead assistant district attorney described the killing and dismemberment of Robinson as "the highest level of violence imaginable".

Several dozen members of the community held a "pink-out" event on Maxwell Anderson's front lawn, converting it into a makeshift memorial to Robinson with balloons, posters, flowers, and stuffed animals.

Anderson's father also expressed condolences and sympathy for the Robinson family.

In September 2024, a mural of Sade Robinson was painted on a wall near the entrance of Pizza Shuttle, a Milwaukee restaurant where she once worked.

== See also ==
- List of homicides in Wisconsin
- List of solved missing person cases (2020s)
