= Arthur "Buddy" Schumacher =

American murder victim

Arthur Schumacher
- Schumacher, c. 1923
- Born: Arthur Louis Schumacher; September 2, 1916; Wauwatosa, Wisconsin, U.S.
- Died: July 1925 (aged 8); Wauwatosa, Wisconsin, U.S.
- Cause of death: Suffocation
- Parents: Arthur Schumacher (father); Florence May Zapp Schumacher (mother)

Arthur Louis "Buddy" Schumacher (September 2, 1916 – July 1925) was an 8-year-old from Wauwatosa, Wisconsin, who was murdered in 1925. His body was discovered on September 12, 1925. Two suspects were interviewed in connection with the case, but it remains unsolved.

== Early life ==
Buddy was born on September 2, 1916, to Arthur "Art" Schumacher and Florence May Zapp Schumacher (née Armstrong). He had an older sister, Jeanette Alice, who was born on April 11, 1915. Buddy attended Lincoln Elementary School in Wauwatosa.

== Disappearance ==
Schumacher went missing on July 24, 1925. He left his house with some neighborhood boys about 9 a.m. and never returned. He was last seen by three of his friends after they hopped off a freight train they had jumped to get a ride to a nearby swimming hole. For seven weeks, the community and state searched desperately to find the boy until his body was found just a mile from his house with his clothing torn and a handkerchief shoved down his throat. The police pursued several promising leads, but to no avail.

In September 1925, two of Schumacher's friends identified Edward Vreeland as a man who had chased them on the day of Schumacher's disappearance. The two boys said they ran away, but Buddy remained. He was never seen alive again after that day. Vreeland had been arrested as a vagrant two days after Schumacher disappeared, taken into custody in the woods where the boy was last seen. He was questioned at the time in relation to the disappearance of the boy but professed ignorance of any connection with the case. In November 1925, 21-year-old William Brandt, who was serving time at the Minnesota State Prison for murdering a young boy in St. Paul under similar circumstances, confessed to the killing of Schumacher, but there were discrepancies between known facts and the statements he made. During their investigation, detectives discovered that at least four other children had been molested or attacked near Wauwatosa.

== Aftermath ==
Buddy was the subject of a nonfiction book, Murder in Wauwatosa: The Mysterious Death of Buddy Schumacher, written by former Wauwatosa resident Paul J. Hoffman that was published in 2012 by The History Press. Hoffman's father, Raymond Hoffman, purchased a house at 8118 Hillcrest Drive in Wauwatosa in 1969 from Buddy's father that the Schumachers had moved into about two years after Buddy died. Raymond Hoffman owned the house until 2004.

== See also ==
- Little Lord Fauntleroy (murder victim)
- List of solved missing person cases (pre-1950)
- List of unsolved murders (1900–1979)
