= Azana Spa shooting =

2012 mass shooting in Wisconsin, U.S.

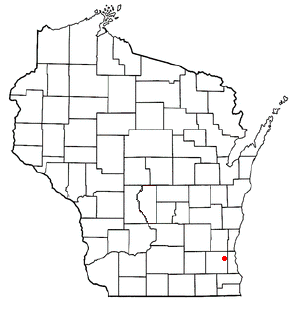
- Location of Brookfield in the U.S. state of Wisconsin.
- Location: 43.03298°N 88.106296°W; 200 North Moorland Road, Brookfield, Wisconsin, U.S.
- Date: October 21, 2012; 14 years ago 11:09 – 11:22 a.m. (CDT; UTC−05:00)
- Target: Zina Haughton (perpetrator's wife)
- Attack type: Mass shooting; murder–suicide; ex-uxoricide; attempted arson
- Weapon: .40 caliber FN FNP semi-automatic pistol
- Deaths: 4 (including the perpetrator)
- Injuries: 4 (including an unborn child)
- Perpetrator: Radcliffe Franklin Haughton
- Motive: Domestic violence

On October 21, 2012, a mass shooting occurred at the Azana Spa in Brookfield, Wisconsin, a suburb of Milwaukee. 45-year-old Radcliffe Franklin Haughton fatally shot three people and wounded three others before committing suicide. One of the victims was the perpetrator's estranged ex-wife.

== Shooting and Aftermath ==
On October 21, 2012, Haughton arrived at the Azana Spa at 200 North Moorland Road by taxi, wearing a camouflage outfit and carrying a backpack. When he didn't see the car of his ex-wife (who was one of those killed), he and the taxi driver ate at a nearby Burger King restaurant. Haughton paid the driver with a $20 tip and left after seeing his ex-wife's car in the parking lot. He was described by the driver as shaking, even stumbling, as he walked from the cab to the spa.

Haughton entered the spa building at 11:09 a.m. He was confronted by his ex-wife, who tried to speak calmly to him, but he grabbed her by the hair and fired four shots into the floor with a FN FNP .40-caliber handgun. Haughton forced everyone inside the spa to lie down on the floor, then continued firing at them. He first shot a pregnant woman, who survived, followed by a woman whose gunshot wound was fatal. Then, he fatally shot another woman as she tried to reason with him while comforting Haughton's stepdaughter, an employee at the spa who was uninjured and managed to escape the building. Finally, after injuring three other women, he shot and killed his ex-wife.

He reloaded at least once, but his gun jammed after changing magazines. The jam allowed the spa's former owner to escape. He locked one of the exit doors and ran upstairs, where he started a fire inside the spa. At 11:22 a.m., Haughton called his brother Robert on his cellphone, telling him to go to Wisconsin as "all hell is breaking loose", before committing suicide.

=== Immediate aftermath ===
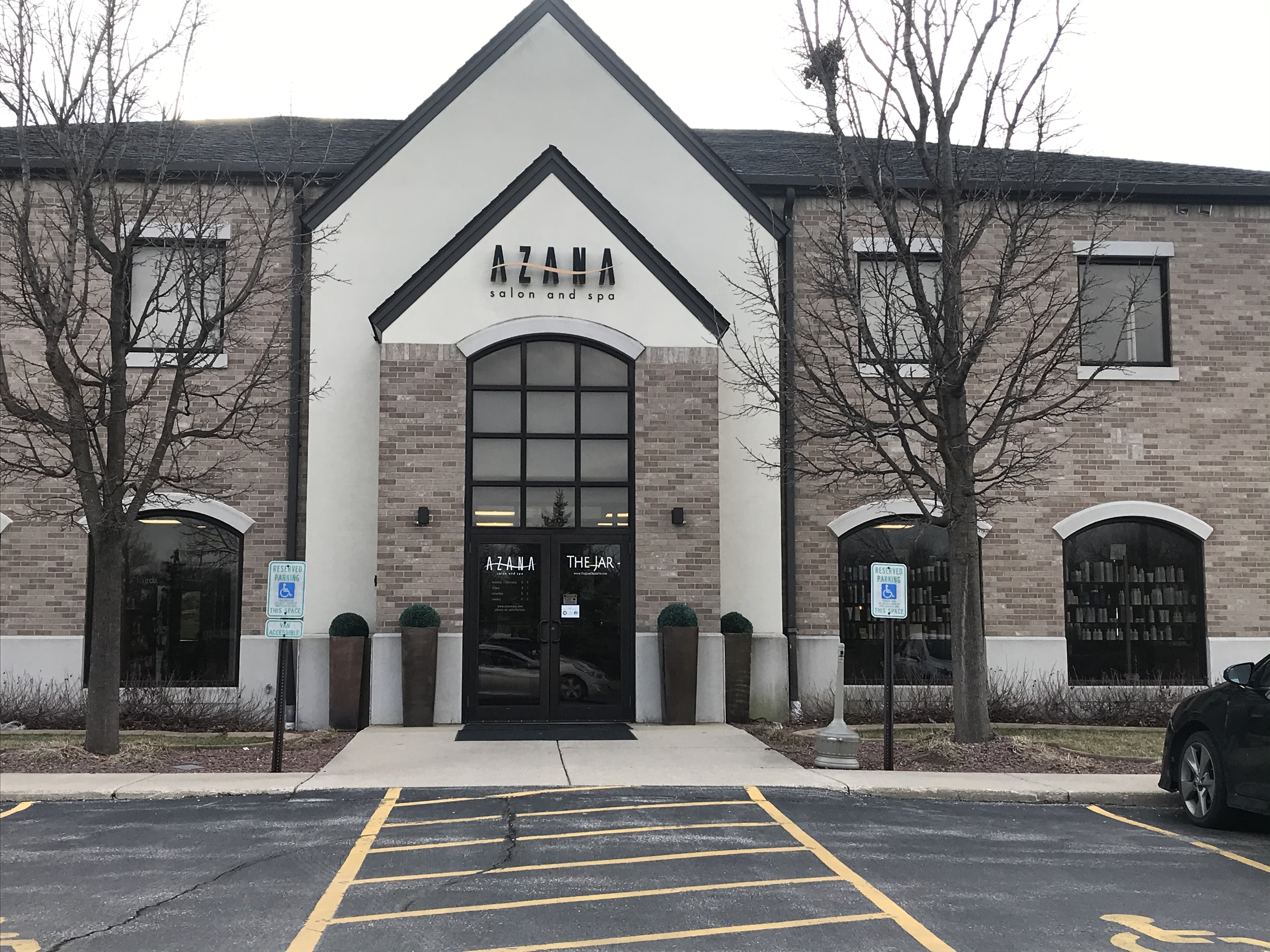
Azana Spa in 2021

Shortly after the shooting, the Milwaukee Journal Sentinel and local television stations reported that shootings had taken place near the Brookfield Square mall, in Brookfield, Wisconsin. Shortly after the incident was reported, it became known that four people had been transported to Froedtert Memorial Hospital with non-critical wounds. It was also reported that three people were being transported to that hospital. Froedtert Hospital was locked down for security purposes, but the hospital resumed normal operations by 4:25 p.m. A total of 19 people, including the injured, were taken out of the spa.

Law enforcement officers were reported to have searched the area surrounding the spa and the Brookfield Square shopping center for a suspect, initially described as a 6-foot-1 African-American male in his 40s. At the time of the incident and during its immediate aftermath, law enforcement instructed bystanders to evacuate the parking lot of the Brookfield Square shopping center, near the spa. At 1:14 p.m. CST, Milwaukee news station TMJ4 reported that the mall had been closed by police.

Shortly after the shooting, a Milwaukee bomb squad was dispatched to the scene, as an improvised explosive device was apparently left behind and reports of the fire emerged. A spokesman for the Federal Bureau of Investigation stated that bomb disposal technicians and hostage negotiators had been dispatched. Agents from the Bureau of Alcohol, Tobacco, Firearms and Explosives were also sent to the scene.

Brookfield Police Chief Dan Tushaus stated that Haughton's car, a Mazda Protege, had been located shortly after the shooting. The 12-year-old daughter of the suspect and his wife was found to be safe at their Brown Deer home.

By the end of the day of the shooting, four people, including Haughton, had died. Everyone in the building had been safely evacuated. Christine Bannister, a dispatch supervisor for Waukesha County, stated that Haughton had been found dead from a self-inflicted gunshot wound. His death was ruled a suicide, committed while inside the spa, but his body wasn't found until six hours after the shooting started.

== Perpetrator and victims ==
=== Perpetrator ===
Haughton shown in a photo released on October 21 by the Brookfield Police Department

Radcliffe Franklin Haughton (December 15, 1966 – October 21, 2012), a 45-year-old male from Brown Deer, was tentatively identified as the shooter. Haughton was raised in Jamaica and moved to the United States as an adult, first taking up residence in Northern Cook County, Illinois, and later moving to the Milwaukee area. He had one daughter, age 12, with estranged wife Zina Haughton, and a stepdaughter, age 20, who was working in the building with her mother Zina Haughton at the time of the shooting. Haughton formerly served in the U.S. Marines.

His father, Radcliffe Haughton Sr., of Florida said he spoke with his son a few days before and nothing seemed amiss. He had called for his son to turn himself in. At the time of the shooting, Haughton had been issued a restraining order and was not allowed to possess firearms. Less than a week before the shooting, Haughton warned his father and a neighbor that he would kill his wife and other people "if [he] had a gun". The day before the shooting, he purchased the weapon used in the shootings online for $500 and bought extra ammunition from a local store.

=== Victims ===
Three women were killed in the attack. One of them was the perpetrator's wife, Zina Haughton, 42, also of Brown Deer, Wisconsin, according to the Waukesha County medical examiner's office. She had heroically tried to dissuade and calm her husband to defuse the situation before being shot, according to witnesses.

The other two deceased women were identified as 32-year-old Cary L. Robuck of Racine and 38-year-old Maelyn M. Lind of Merton.

Zina Haughton was shot multiple times, Robuck was shot once in the neck, and Lind was shot in the head and chest.

The living victims included a woman seven months pregnant who was shot in the neck, another who was shot in the thigh, a third who was shot in the hand, and a fourth whose injuries were not further specified; all were expected to survive. All four were recovering at Froedtert Hospital from their gunshot wounds, three of them being in satisfactory condition and the fourth in critical condition; three of these victims required surgery.

== Reactions ==
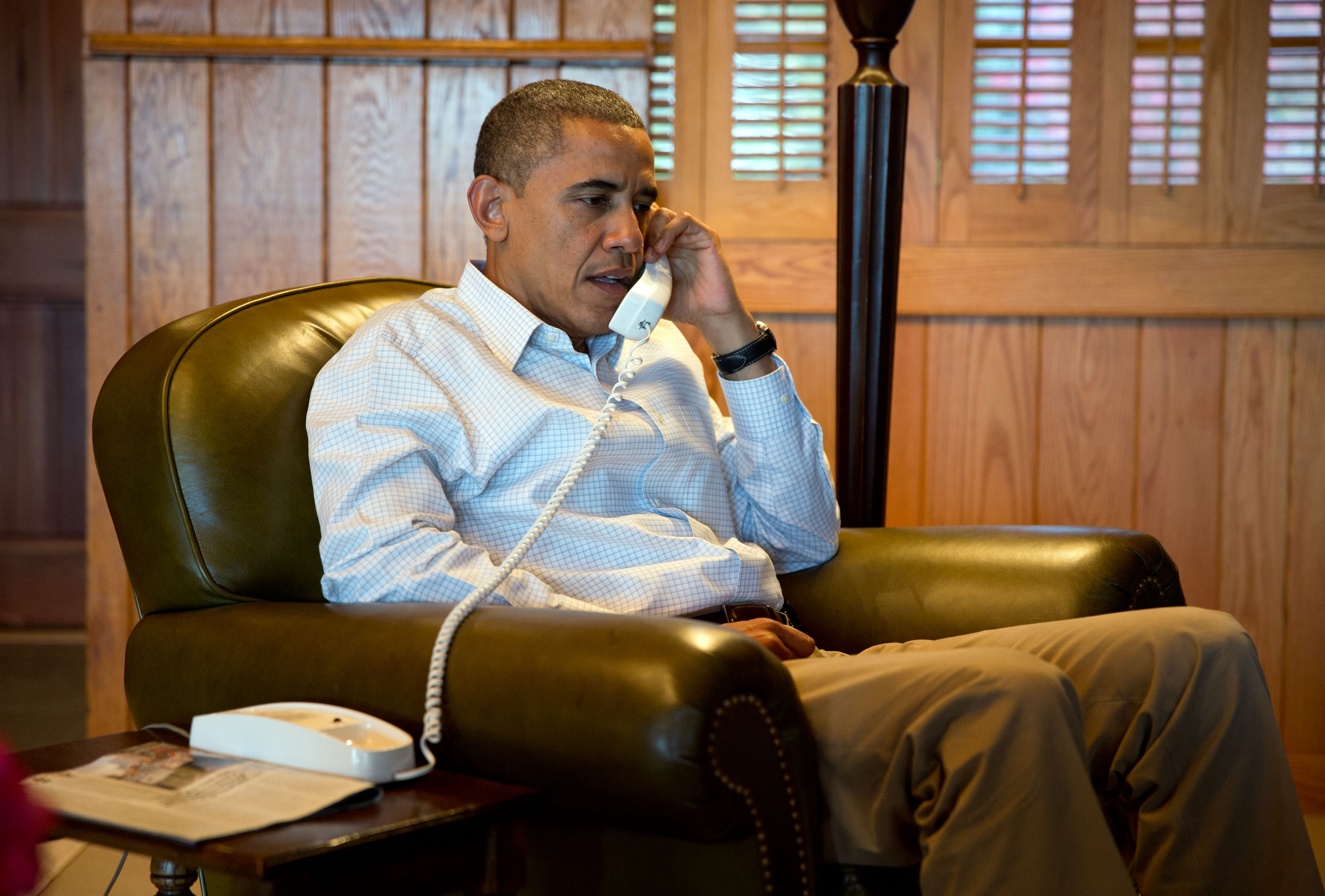
Obama on phone with FBI Director Robert Mueller and Chief of Staff Jack Lew to discuss the shooting on October 21, 2012.

The White House issued a statement saying that President Barack Obama and First Lady Michelle Obama's thoughts and prayers were with the victims of "this horrible shooting" and their families.

Paul Ryan, the Republican vice-presidential nominee and Congressman from another Wisconsin district, and his wife Janna said that they were "shocked and saddened" by the incident.

The shooting sparked efforts by Zina Daniel's brother, Elvin Daniel, and his wife Cheryl to fight for stricter gun laws and domestic abuse prevention. On October 21, 2013, the first anniversary of the shooting, a public candlelight vigil was held at Milwaukee City Hall, attended by Milwaukee Mayor Tom Barrett and Brookfield Mayor Steven Ponto, as well as members of anti-domestic violence organizations.

== See also ==
- List of homicides in Wisconsin
