= Murder of Glenn Kopitske =

2003 murder in Wisconsin, United States

The murder of Glenn Kopitske (July 24, 1966 – July 31, 2003) occurred in Winnebago County, Wisconsin on July 31, 2003, when 37-year-old Kopitske was killed by 17-year-old Gary Hirte. Hirte initially admitted to killing Kopitske "to see if he could get away with it"; however, he later claimed to have experienced temporary insanity that resulted from his rage after a supposed homosexual encounter with Kopitske.

== The victim ==
Glenn Kopitske was adopted by Shirley and Virgil Kopitske, a couple who had already buried two children. After college at the University of Texas in Dallas, where he tried his hand at stand-up comedy, he returned to live near his parents in Winnebago County, Wisconsin. Diagnosed with bipolar disorder as a teenager, Kopitske needed to be close to his parents but required some independence as well.

In 1996, Kopitske—who received a monthly federal check due to his psychological disability, and supported himself by working at Wal-Mart and substitute teaching in New London—took $500 and declared himself a candidate for the White House, even though he was five years too young to qualify as a presidential candidate. He even invited citizens to a meet-and-greet luncheon. He did community theater, appearing in a local theater production of Joseph and the Amazing Technicolor Dreamcoat.

At 37, Kopitske—never married—lived alone in Winnebago County, far from any neighbors.

== The perpetrator ==
Gary Hirte (born 1986) became the first Eagle Scout that Weyauwega, Wisconsin had produced in 20 years. Hirte worked at Dairy Queen. During his senior year, he'd won a scholarship to St. Cloud State University in Minnesota, where he planned to study criminal justice.

== The discovery ==
Glenn Kopitske had been dead for almost two days when his mother drove to his house on Saturday, August 2, after not being able to reach him by phone, and discovered his nude body. Kopitske's back door was locked, which his mother said was unusual for him. Shirley Kopitske also noticed that her son's car keys, which he always kept on the kitchen table, were missing.

The summer heat had affected Kopitske's body so badly that authorities initially thought he had died of natural causes. Only on Tuesday, August 5, when a pathologist turned Kopitske's body over and noticed liquefied brain matter leaking from a wound in the back of the head did authorities realize that Kopitske had been shot to death, and that the marks on his chest and back were actually post-mortem stab wounds.

The physical search of the murder scene turned up no further evidence. During a canvas of the neighborhood, a neighbor claimed that a few nights earlier he had seen "an older car with square headlights and rectangular taillights" driving through the area, flashing a bright light at the three residences on the dead end street. It would be several months before investigators knew who had killed Kopitske, and why.

== Trophies and boasts ==
Two weeks after Kopitske's murder Hirte called his friend, Eric Wenzelow, and asked him if he knew about Kopitske's murder. Over two weeks earlier, Wenzelow had been with Hirte, cruising Winnebago County at night, in Hirte's Dodge Dynasty shining a 500,000-candle-power spotlight around. Hirte called it "shining for deer". The game involved shining the light at deer, thus paralyzing them, and took them right past Kopitske's house.

"I did it", Hirte told Wenzelow during that call.

Wenzelow did not believe Hirte initially. So Hirte showed him the 8-inch long hunting knife he said he used to stab Kopitske in the back and chest, and the keys he said he'd taken from Kopitske's home.

In August 2003 Hirte met Olivia Thoma at the Waupaca County Fair, where she was chosen "Fairest of the Fair". Over the course of their relationship, Hirte told Thoma how he had murdered Kopitske. Thoma became convinced that Hirte was telling the truth and, in January 2004, told local police about her suspicions, providing details about the murder that had not been reported in the media.

Hirte told Thoma that he had driven his father's car, which matched the description given by Kopitske's neighbor, to Kopitske's home and shot him in the back of the head with a 12-gauge shotgun, then stabbed him twice in the back and once in the heart.

On January 28, 2004, Thoma agreed to engage Hirte in a telephone conversation about the murder, while the police listened and recorded what was said. During that telephone call, Hirte told Thoma he'd killed Kopitske "to see if he could get away with it".

After his arrest, Hirte would confess to a very different motive.

== The arrest ==
The following day, police interviewed Hirte's friends at school, including Wenzelow, who told them about driving past Kopitske's house with Hirte in July while they were "shining for deer", and how Hirte had told him about the murder and showed him the knife.

Hirte was called to the principal's office and arrested. Hirte admitted telling friends that he had killed Kopitske but claimed to have been making it up. He later hired Gerald Boyle, who had previously defended Jeffrey Dahmer, as his defense attorney.

The same day, police arrived at the Hirtes' home with a search warrant. In Hirte's room, they found Kopitske's keys above the doorsill. They also found a 12-gauge shotgun in the basement.

On August 30, 2004, Hirte was charged with first-degree murder. He was held in Winnebago County jail on $400,000 bond. He pleaded not guilty, and later changed his plea to not guilty by reason of mental disease or defect. If he were found not guilty by reason of mental disease or defect, Hirte would be able to petition every six months for release.

Lawyers espoused that the DNA evidence suggested that the theory that Hirte killed Kopitske just to see if he could get away with it was not true.

== The murder ==
Police alleged, based in part on Hirte's recorded comments to Thoma, that on the night of Kopitske's murder, Hirte parked his car at the end of the dead-end road, and retrieved a 12-gauge shotgun from the trunk of the car.

Kopitske was asleep, but likely woke up and got out of bed after Hirte entered the house. Upon seeing Hirte and his shotgun, Kopitske pleaded with Hirte not to shoot him. Hirte then said he ordered Kopitske to lie down on the floor.

Forensics tests show that Hirte then pressed the muzzle of the shotgun in to the back of Kopitske's head and then fired. Hirte said he then stabbed Kopitske twice. The second time, the knife plunged in so deep that Hirte had to use two hands to pull it out. Before leaving, Hirte spotted Kopitske's keys on the table, and slipped them into his pocket.

== The motive ==
On January 31, 2005, Hirte's attorney said that Hirte had homosexual urges that intensified when he drank alcohol. Those urges, Boyle said, led to a sexual encounter between Hirte and Kopitske, after which Hirte's rage over the encounter led him to return to Kopitske's house and kill him. Boyle said that Hirte could not explain the murder for months, until a forensic report suggested a possible sexual element to the crime. Hirte then "broke down" and told the story of what he said happened between him and Kopitske.

"One of the torments he had", Boyle told the jury about Hirte, was that "he didn't understand his own sexuality".

Hirte said that hours before the murder he had been sitting on top of his car, underneath a bridge, drinking alcohol and listening to Nirvana. He'd finished six malt liquors and 15 shots of vodka when Kopitske drove up in his car. Hirte said Kopitske flirted with him, and the two agreed to return to Kopitske's house where Hirte performed oral sex on Kopitske. According to Hirte, their encounter was consensual.

Hirte testified that afterward he returned to his car and fell asleep. When he awoke, he was sober and enraged about having had sex with another man. Hirte said he felt "just grossed out beyond belief, disappointed ... [at] the proof of my imperfection that I had done these things". He said he believed a homosexual act was "not as bad as raping or torturing someone" but was worse than murder.

Expert witness for the defense, John Liccione, said that Hirte was in the middle of a psychotic depressive reaction, though he had no history of mental problems. Assistant District Attorney Michelle, emphasized that the sexual encounter did not come up until trial, asked Liccionne during cross examination if Hirte would rather have had his parents believe that he was a cold-blooded killer or a homosexual. Licionne answered that it would be very difficult for a teenager in a religious family to admit homosexual feelings or activities.

Hirte's parents believed their son's story about a sexual encounter with Kopitske, and that he would have been willing to risk life imprisonment to keep that secret to himself. Kopitske's parents said later that there was no way the sexual encounter Hirte talked about had happened.

District Attorney Bill Lennon doubted that the sexual encounter happened, and said that no forensic evidence suggested a sexual encounter.

== Sentencing ==
On February 4, 2005, the jury rejected Hirte's insanity plea, resulting in a life sentence with the possibility of parole after 32 years for Hirte.

== See also ==
- List of homicides in Wisconsin
- Thrill killing
