= Steven Zelich =

American murderer (born 1961)

- Mugshot of Zelich in 2021
- Born: Steven Mark Zelich; October 29, 1961 (age 64)
- Other names: Suitcase Murderer; MrHandcuffs
- Occupation: Police officer (former)
- Status: Incarcerated
- Motive: Sexual gratification
- Convictions: Second-degree murder; First-degree reckless homicide; Hiding a corpse (2 counts)
- Penalty: 70 years imprisonment

Details
- Victims: 2
- Span of crimes: 2012–2013
- Country: United States
- States: Wisconsin and Minnesota
- Date apprehended: June 25, 2014

Steven Mark Zelich (born October 29, 1961) is an American convicted murderer and former police officer for West Allis, Wisconsin, dubbed the "Wisconsin Suitcase Murderer" by the press. Zelich lured his two victims through sadomasochism websites, committing one murder in Wisconsin and one in Minnesota between 2012 and 2013. He is known for dumping the victims' bodies in suitcases on a Wisconsin roadway. He pleaded guilty to all charges and was sentenced to 70 years in prison.

== Murders ==
Zelich frequented S&M websites under the alias "mrhandcuffs", where he searched for submissive sex slave partners. Here, he met his two victims, 19-year-old Jenny Gamez and 37-year-old Laura Simonson. Gamez was killed in Wisconsin in August 2012 and Simonson was killed in Minnesota in November 2013. Zelich claimed both died accidentally during sex. He admitted that he put their bodies into suitcases and hid them in his home after causing their deaths. Zelich later placed the suitcases in the trunk of his vehicle and then dumped them in tall grass along a Geneva, Wisconsin, roadway. On June 5, 2014, a highway worker discovered the discarded suitcases. He shifted them to the side of the road to clear a path for his mower. The two suitcases were later discovered by passers-by who approached to see swarms of flies.

According to the subsequent criminal complaint, the more decomposed of the two bodies was partly concealed in black plastic garbage bags and had her hands bound behind her back with rope. The other body "was found with a rope wrapped around her neck, had a sexual ball gag strapped into her mouth with a collar and was naked."

Zelich, who had continued to use S&M dating websites after the recovery of the bodies, was arrested on June 27, 2014.

== Investigation and legal proceedings ==
Laura Simonson was immediately identified from her dental records. However, Jenny Gamez was initially unidentified and listed as a Jane Doe. Gamez was last seen by her family in Cottage Grove, Oregon, in 2012, when she mentioned she was moving. She was never reported missing. After Walworth County released a composite sketch of Gamez, friends and family identified her. The identification of Jenny Gamez was confirmed by dental records on June 28, 2014. Three days earlier, Zelich was charged with two counts of hiding a corpse and given a million-dollar bail. He was later charged with murder.

=== Guilty plea and sentencing ===
In early 2016, Zelich pleaded guilty to first-degree reckless homicide in the death of Jenny Gamez and was sentenced to 35 years imprisonment. In February 2017, he was sentenced to 25 years for second-degree murder for the murder of Laura Simonson. Zelich received another 10 years for the charges of hiding of corpses in October 2017. Altogether, he was sentenced to 70 years in prison with a minimum non-parole period of 58 1/3 years, which is a de facto life sentence since his earliest release date given his multiple sentences is at a date when it is virtually guaranteed that he would be dead.

== In the media ==
Crime Watch Daily reported on the case, focusing on the Walworth County police's identification process of Jenny Gamez through forensic science.
