= Walter E. Ellis =

American serial killer and rapist

- Mugshot in 2009
- Born: Walter Earl Ellis; June 24, 1960; Milwaukee, Wisconsin, U.S.
- Died: December 1, 2013 (aged 53); Sioux Falls, South Dakota, U.S.
- Other names: "The Milwaukee North Side Strangler" "Wodell"
- Conviction: First degree intentional homicide (7 counts)
- Penalty: Life imprisonment without parole

Details
- Victims: 7+
- Span of crimes: August 10, 1974 – September 7, 2009
- Country: United States
- State: Wisconsin
- Date apprehended: September 7, 2009

Walter Earl Ellis (June 24, 1960 – December 1, 2013), known as the Milwaukee North Side Strangler, was an American serial killer, rapist, and robber who raped and strangled at least seven women in the city of Milwaukee, Wisconsin between 1986 and 2009. Until May 2009, the killings were considered to be independent of one another, but were then linked together via DNA profiling. Ellis was arrested as a suspect on September 7, 2009, and convicted for the seven murders in February 2011, receiving seven consecutive life sentences without the chance of parole.

== Early life ==
Walter E. Ellis was born on June 24, 1960, in Milwaukee, as one of six children to LeRoy and Mattie Ellis. Beginning in early childhood, Ellis showed signs of antisocial behavior, acting impulsively and aggressively towards his peers, frequently assaulting classmates and neighboring children. For this, he earned a reputation as a local bully and was frequently disciplined. After finishing the 8th grade, he dropped out of school in 1974 due to poor academic performance and chronic absenteeism, turning towards a life of crime.

== Criminal history ==
At the age of 14, on August 10, 1974, Ellis was arrested for the first time for robbery and attempted murder; however, he was let go with a large fine as he was a minor. In the following four years, he was arrested twice more for theft and only ordered to pay a fine, but in November 1978, when he was arrested for robbery, he pled guilty and was given 4 years of probation. In May 1979, Ellis was arrested for possessing drugs, but during the investigation, he was able to prove that the drug had been sold to him by the pharmacy without a prescription, so he again only paid a fine. A year later, in May 1980, while trying to become a pimp, he got into a fight with local hustlers and prostitutes, for which he was arrested and charged with extortion but later released due to lack of evidence. Over the next four years, he would repeatedly be indicted for various other offenses, for which he was either given probation or parole. In February 1985, when he was released from prison, Ellis attempted to find an honest job working as a day laborer in addition to taking on odd jobs but was charged with extorting that same September. The charges were later dropped when it was learned that the woman was a prostitute, ruining her credibility and resulting in Ellis' release.

On October 18, 1986, Ellis was arrested for disturbing the public order, and during his arrest, he attacked the police officer. For this, he was ordered to spend the next seven months in the county jail. In May 1987, almost immediately after his release, he was rearrested for theft and sent back to prison for a year; however, he was released on parole after 9 months. In November 1988, he was caught in an attempted carjacking during which he also harmed the arresting officer, for which he was sentenced to two years imprisonment for violating his parole. When he was released on January 9, 1990, Ellis joined a drug trafficking ring, "The Brothers of the Struggle," who frequently engaged in rivalry with other gangs based in Milwaukee. In June, he was arrested for distributing drugs and convicted in November 1990 of the charge. By this point, due to his extensive rap sheet which also included several federal violations, Ellis was ordered to serve his sentence in a federal prison in Minnesota.

In May 1992, he was released yet again, but in November of that year, he was back behind bars for violating the conditions of his parole. Because of this, he was ordered to enter a rehabilitation program. At the halfway house, prisoners were allowed various liberties such as having a job, studying or attending church but were also frequently allowed to leave after bribing the officials. In December 1992, Ellis was arrested for leaving the premises without permission but was freed from any punishment after he informed the authorities about the rampant corruption. Because of this, he was hired as a police informant for several years.

Over the following years, Ellis repeatedly violated the conditions of his parole but avoided criminal liability each time due to his status as an informant: between 1994 and 1995, he was repeatedly arrested for assaulting his girlfriends, injuring one of them with a screwdriver. In December 1997, he was arrested for attempted robbery, during which he assaulted the arresting officer, but was only sentenced to five and a half years of probation. Over the next few months, however, he committed several additional offences which resulted in his exclusion as an informant, with police ceasing any and all contact with him. In August 1998, he was sentenced to 3 years imprisonment for reckless endangerment, which he served at the Oshkosh Correctional Institution. In July 2001, Ellis was released and returned to Milwaukee, where he spent the next few years earning money as a low-skilled laborer.

== Exposure ==
In May 2009, while reexamining the cold case murders of seven prostitutes between the ages of 19 and 41, the Milwaukee police learned via a DNA analysis that all of the killings were committed by a single perpetrator. A statewide investigation eventually discovered that the Justice Department was missing saliva and blood samples from inmate Walter E. Ellis, which were apparently lost on the way to the forensic labs. In late August, Ellis was ordered to give a sample, as a law instituted in 2001 declared that all convicted criminals had to give DNA samples. After he failed to appear at the police station, an arrest warrant was issued for Ellis while police entered and examined his apartment. A toothbrush containing traces of his saliva was confiscated and examined, and within a few days, Ellis' DNA was matched to the murders of nine women in a three-mile area of northern Milwaukee, spanning from 1986 to 2007.

=== Arrest, trial and imprisonment ===
Shortly after his arrest warrant was issued, Ellis' car, a maroon 1994 Buick Century, was spotted in the City of Franklin. On September 7, 2009, he was located in one of the city's motels, where he was staying with his 54-year-old girlfriend Tressie Johnson, who was not from Milwaukee and was unaware of what he was doing. He was also holding her against her will, which is why she was with him when he was apprehended. At the time of his arrest, police seized a small quantity of crack cocaine and a crack pipe.

Following his arrest, Ellis was charged with the murders of seven women: 31-year-old Deborah L. Harris, strangled and dumped in the river on October 10, 1986; 19-year-old Tanya L. Miller, strangled on October 11, 1986; 25-year-old Irene Smith, strangled on November 28, 1992; 28-year-old Florence McCormick, found strangled on April 24, 1995; 37-year-old Sheila Farrior, whose body was discovered on June 27, 1995; 41-year-old Joyce Ann Mims, who was found strangled on June 20, 1996, and 28-year-old Ouithreaun C. Stokes, whose body was found on April 27, 2007. In addition to these killings, Ellis was suspected in the killing of 32-year-old Carron D. Kilpatrick on October 13, 1994. Curtis McCoy had been charged with her murder, but was later acquitted at a jury trial. Aside from her, he was also a suspect in the murder of 16-year-old Jessica Payne on August 30, 1995; unlike the other victims, she had died from blood loss due to a slash to her throat; this discrepancy caused the prosecutor to not press charges against Ellis, rationalizing that he might have only raped her.

Following Ellis' arrest, doubts began to arise over the conviction of Chaunte Dean Ott, who was initially convicted of Payne's murder in 1996 based solely on witness testimony. After spending 14 years in prison, all charges against him were dropped and he was released in 2009. Similarly, in May 2010, Ellis' DNA was matched to the 1998 murder of Maryetta Griffin, for which William Avery had been convicted in 2005. After this revelation, Avery was exonerated and released, and his case declared a miscarriage of justice.

After he was charged, Ellis initially pleaded not guilty, with his trial scheduled to begin in April 2011. In February of that year, however, after consulting with his lawyer, Ellis accepted a plea agreement by the prosecutor's office, admitting his guilt and petitioning for a sentence without trial. This was accepted by the prosecutor and the victims' families, and on February 24, 2011, Ellis was sentenced to seven consecutive life sentences without the chance of parole.

== Death ==
After his conviction, Ellis was transferred to serve his sentence at the South Dakota State Penitentiary in Sioux Falls, South Dakota, following an agreement between the two states. Shortly after his arrival in prison, his health began to deteriorate, and he was transferred to a prison hospital, where he was diagnosed with diabetes. On December 1, 2013, Ellis died due to complications from his diabetes, aged 53.

== See also ==
- List of homicides in Wisconsin
- List of serial killers in the United States
