= David Van Dyke =

American serial killer (born 1959)

David Allen Van Dyke
- Van Dyke in 1981
- Born: January 14, 1959 (age 67)
- Status: Incarcerated
- Convictions: First-degree murder Attempted murder Armed robbery
- Penalty: Life imprisonment (x6) + 40 years

Details
- Victims: 6 killed; 1 survived
- Span of crimes: July 19, 1979 – April 25, 1980
- Country: United States
- State: Wisconsin
- Date apprehended: May 23, 1980
- Imprisoned at: Waupun Correctional Institution

David Allen Van Dyke (born January 14, 1959) is an American serial killer who bludgeoned, beat, and stabbed six people to death at their residences in Milwaukee, Wisconsin, between July 1979 and April 1980. He was arrested in May 1980 after an attempted burglary and subsequently connected to the murders through fingerprints. He was convicted of the murders in 1981 and received six terms of life imprisonment as well as an additional 40 years. He is now imprisoned at a maximum security penitentiary in Waupun.

== Early life ==
Van Dyke was born on January 14, 1959. One of five children, he was raised by his grandmother until she died when he was six. He then moved in with his mother, who had trouble raising him. He refused to attend school, dropping out after seventh grade; broke windows; beat up weaker children; threatened his niece with a knife; and often threatened to harm his mother. Additionally, he stole money from his mother's purse and paid stronger children not to beat him up. He also used the money to buy a canary, which he strangled to death while laughing. Van Dyke was often teased about his obesity. He once punched a woman for calling him a fat pig. However, he later lost 40 pounds through a weight reduction program. As an adult, Van Dyke never held a job. He earned about $600 a month as a pool shark and a burglar. He often lived in cars and abandoned buildings. In April 1979, he was paroled for a burglary conviction.

== Crimes ==
Between July 1979 and April 1980, Van Dyke murdered four women and two men at their residences in the same area of northern Milwaukee. Gaining entry into his victims homes by asking to use their telephone or bathroom, he would then bludgeon, beat, or stab his victims to death using items in their homes. Afterwards, he burglarized them, stealing money, clock radios, televisions, or jewelry. He then fled the scene, leaving the weapons he used – a tire jack, ice pick, claw hammer, knives, or scissors – behind. His victims varied in age, race, and gender.

Van Dyke's first victim, 69-year-old Della Mae Liggens, was stabbed to death on July 19, 1979.

On August 10, 1979, Van Dyke stabbed 78-year-old Florence Burkard in her North Side home 43 times with a pair of scissors, the fatal wound being to her heart. Her body was discovered by two volunteers of a service organization for the elderly, who were there to deliver her a hot meal. Although the attack began in her kitchen, Burkard's body was found at the bottom of her basement stairs.

Van Dyke beat 79-year-old Helen Wronski to death in the living room of her East Side home. He then covered her body with a sheet and walked into her bedroom, where he rummaged through the drawers of her dresser. However, he did not steal anything from there. Her body was discovered by her son on November 9, 1979, and she had last been seen alive one day earlier. Investigators found partial fingerprints, but failed to match them to any known suspects.

On January 25, 1980, Van Dyke bludgeoned Charles Golston, 63, with a claw hammer. Golston's friend found him bleeding and unconscious. He spent more than three months in a coma before succumbing to his injuries in early May.

On March 3, 1980, 49-year-old Bernard Fonder died on his bed after receiving several blows to the head. A few days before his death, he gave a note to his downstairs neighbors with the name and address of Fonder's former roommate, who had beaten him the previous December. He forced the roommate to move out, but he returned one night in February because his girlfriend had kicked him out. The note instructed his neighbor to hand the note to police if something were to happen to him. In turn, the roommate was initially charged with Fonder's murder, but released after fingerprints found at the scene did not match his.

On April 14, 1980, a 28-year-old woman let Van Dyke into her home after he expressed interest in buying her car. She went upstairs to find something and he followed her. When she turned opposite to him, he grabbed her by the throat and attempted to throw her on the ground, but instead tripped her. After she fell to the ground, he began stomping on her head. However, she managed to get up, so he hit her in the head with her ashtray. He then cut her with pieces of glass from the ashtray and a wine bottle, caressing her wounds with his fingers. She managed to escape her house, first running to a nearby home, where the occupant shut the door on her, then to a tavern, where she received help. Van Dyke fled the scene after stealing $118.

On April 25, 1980, Van Dyke sexually assaulted and beat 30-year-old Helen Louise Bellamy to death in her North Side home with a tire jack. Her 13-year-old son discovered her body partially covered with a sheet in the dining room when he returned home from school. Police sought two men wearing overalls, who may have been impersonating television repairmen, in connection to her murder.

== Arrest and prosecution ==
Investigators linked the murders together, and compared the fingerprints found at the two murder scenes to every local burglary suspect. On May 23, 1980, Van Dyke was arrested for an attempted burglary and his fingerprints matched. He was subsequently taken to an interrogation room and questioned for hours until he confessed, at times crying. He was charged with six counts of first-degree murder, one count of attempted murder, and one count of armed robbery.

Van Dyke's trial began in February 1981. On the first day of the trial, his surviving victim recounted her attack. Against the advice of his attorney, Van Dyke took the witness stand in his own defense. Although he admitted to 200 burglaries, he claimed that he would never harm a victim if confronted, and instead leave the property. He also confessed to hitting his surviving victim with an ashtray, but claimed it was in self-defense after she cut him with a broken vase. When asked to explain the cuts on the woman's arms, he proposed that she injured herself by falling on a broken bottle. He further accused the police of fabricating his confessions, asking the jury how he could confess to crimes that he claimed to have no knowledge of. After deliberating for four-and-a-half hours, the jury found Van Dyke guilty on all charges, and he was given six life sentences. At the time, Van Dyke was sentenced to the longest term in state history, surpassing mass murderer Douglas Dean, who had been given five life sentences. He is now imprisoned at the Waupun Correctional Institution in Waupun, Wisconsin. He will be eligible for parole in 2048, when he is 89-years-old.
