= Wisconsin Circuit Court Access =

Website

- Original author: State of Wisconsin
- Website: wcca.wicourts.gov

Wisconsin Circuit Court Access is a website that provides access to some circuit courts records of Wisconsin. The website displays the case information entered into the Consolidated Court Automation Programs (CCAP) case management system by court staff in the counties where the case files are located. The court record summaries provided by the system are all public records under Wisconsin open records law sections 19.31-19.39 of the Wisconsin Statutes.

WCCA was created in response to an increasing number of requests for court records from district attorneys, sheriffs’ departments, and other court business partners. Title companies, abstractors, members of the media and the general public have also benefited from WCCA.

Since WCCA was implemented on January 1, 1992 in Vilas County, Wisconsin it has steadily expanded to all Wisconsin counties. The last county that joined the online system was Portage County in 2008. The website averages about a million data requests a day. It also has generated privacy concerns.

== Oversight ==
Appointed by the director of state courts, the WCCA Oversight Committee serves as an advisory board on policy issues related to the WCCA Web site.

The original WCCA Oversight Committee was convened in 2000. This committee was instrumental in the development of a comprehensive policy that addresses electronic access to circuit court records. The committee is being reconvened to review and possibly modify this policy based on feedback received in the intervening years about the information available on the WCCA Web site.

In 2006, changes were made to the system that included a glossary of legal terms, a caution to employers regarding job discrimination, a decrease in the amount of time certain records remain public and an executive summary page.

== Controversy ==
Personal information appearing in court records is protected by Wisconsin statutes only in limited circumstances. Wisconsin case law has said that even if the information may be harmful to an individual's reputation or privacy, that is not sufficient to allow a judge to seal a court record. Those who feel their safety is at risk may petition the court to remove their addresses from the online record of a non-criminal case.

Wisconsin law allows a judge to "expunge" a case in only two situations, both involving youthful offenders:

- Misdemeanors committed by person under age 25. If the judge ordered expunction upon successful completion of the sentence, the record can be expunged. See §973.015, Wis. Stats.
- Adjudication of a juvenile delinquent. A juvenile who has been adjudged delinquent can, upon reaching age 17, petition the judge for expunction of the juvenile adjudication. See §938.355, Wis. Stats. (WCCA does not display juvenile adjudications because they are not public records.)

An expunged case is sealed by the clerk of court and is available to be viewed only with a court order. If the judge properly orders a case expunged, any reference to it will be removed from WCCA. A judge has no other authority or power to expunge cases, and there are no similar provisions for other types of cases.

Privacy advocate and Wisconsin State Assembly Representative Marlin Schneider, who is on the CCAP Oversight Committee, has said:

This easy access to information via computer constitutes a serious threat to individuals' reputations, job applications, housing and even getting a date. It has been used for identify theft, election mischief, and needs to be controlled. In a state which prides itself on access to information it is unlikely that anything will be done about this until a Supreme Court Justice or Governor is the victim of this insidious system.

Judge Gary Carlson of the Wisconsin Circuit Court, who served on the CCAP Creation Committee and continues to serve on the Oversight Committee, has said that people should be able to find out if someone served time. He said public records are public whether it's on the Internet or a hard-copy file. Judge Carlson said,

These are public records. These are the people's records. They're not mine. They're not yours. The people have paid for these records. They own them. They're their records. And they're entitled to see what is going on in their court system.

Free information advocates argue that WCCA does not contain any more personal information than the phone book - it does not include Social Security numbers - so it does not make identity theft any easier. Others argue that it does make identity theft easier because it contains information on gender, race, and birth date, which are not included in a phonebook.
