= George Jones (Hampshire cricketer) =

Scottish cricketer

Personal information
- Full name: George Lennard Jones
- Born: 11 February 1907; Lockerbie, Dumfriesshire, Scotland
- Died: 17 June 1954 (aged 47); Aston Reynold, Shropshire, England
- Batting: Right-handed

Domestic team information
- Years: Team
- 1937: Hampshire

Career statistics
Competition	First-class
Matches	9
Runs scored	169
Batting average	14.08
100s/50s	–/–
Top score	37*
Catches/stumpings	3/–
- Source: Cricinfo, 15 January 2010

George Lennard Jones (11 February 1907 — died 17 June 1954) was a Scottish first-class cricketer.

Jones was born in February 1907 at Lockerbie. He played national counties cricket for Dorset, making his debut against Monmouthshire in the 1925 Minor Counties Championship. He played minor counties cricket for Dorset regularly until 1927, but there after appeared intermittently until 1934, having made twenty appearances. He later played first-class cricket for Hampshire in 1937, making eight appearances as a batsman in the County Championship, in addition to playing against the touring New Zealanders at Bournemouth. In nine first-class matches, he scored 169 runs at an average of 14.08; his highest score, an unbeaten 37, came against the New Zealanders. Jones died at Aston Reynold in Shropshire in June 1954.
