= Dane, Wisconsin =

- Village
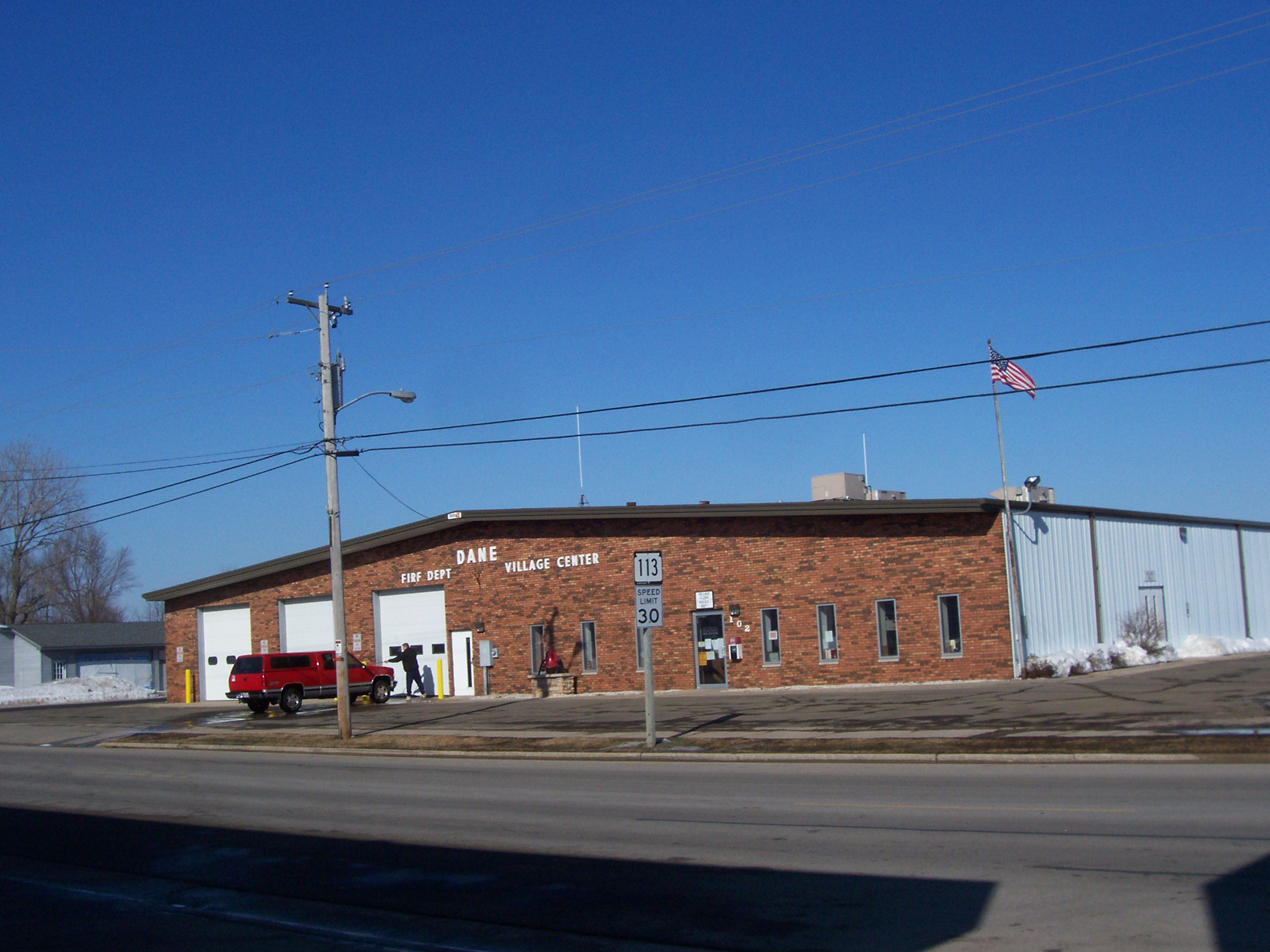
- Dane village hall and fire station

- Location of Dane in Dane County, Wisconsin.
- Coordinates: 43°14′35″N 89°31′51″W
- Country: United States
- State: Wisconsin
- County: Dane

Government
  - Village President: Don Postler

Area
  - Total: 1.19 sq mi (3.09 km^{2})
  - Land: 1.19 sq mi (3.07 km^{2})
  - Water: 0.0077 sq mi (0.02 km^{2})
- Elevation: 1,125 ft (343 m)

Population (2020)
  - Total: 1,117
  - Density: 959.0/sq mi (370.26/km^{2})
- Time zone: UTC-6 (Central (CST))
  - Summer (DST): UTC-5 (CDT)
- Area code: 608
- FIPS code: 55-18725
- GNIS feature ID: 1583047
- Website: www.villageofdane.gov

Dane is a village in Dane County, Wisconsin, United States. The population was 1,117 at the 2020 census. Located in the Town of Dane, the village is part of the Madison, Wisconsin metropolitan area.

== History ==
A post office called Dane was first established in 1844. The village was named for Nathan Dane, author of the Northwest Ordinance. The village was incorporated in April 1899. The community's St. Michael Catholic Church was struck by lightning and burned down in 1974, but has since been rebuilt.

== Geography ==
According to the United States Census Bureau, the village has a total area of 1.14 square miles (2.95 km^{2}), of which 1.13 square miles (2.93 km^{2}) is land and 0.01 square miles (0.03 km^{2}) is water.

The primary road is the community is Wisconsin Highway 113, which is the village's Main Street running in an east–west direction. The highway heads north to Lodi and south to Waunakee.

== Demographics ==
Historical population
Census	Pop.	Note	%±
1880	125		—
1900	280		—
1910	296		5.7%
1920	316		6.8%
1930	280		−11.4%
1940	301		7.5%
1950	305		1.3%
1960	394		29.2%
1970	486		23.4%
1980	518		6.6%
1990	621		19.9%
2000	799		28.7%
2010	995		24.5%
2020	1,117		12.3%
U.S. Decennial Census

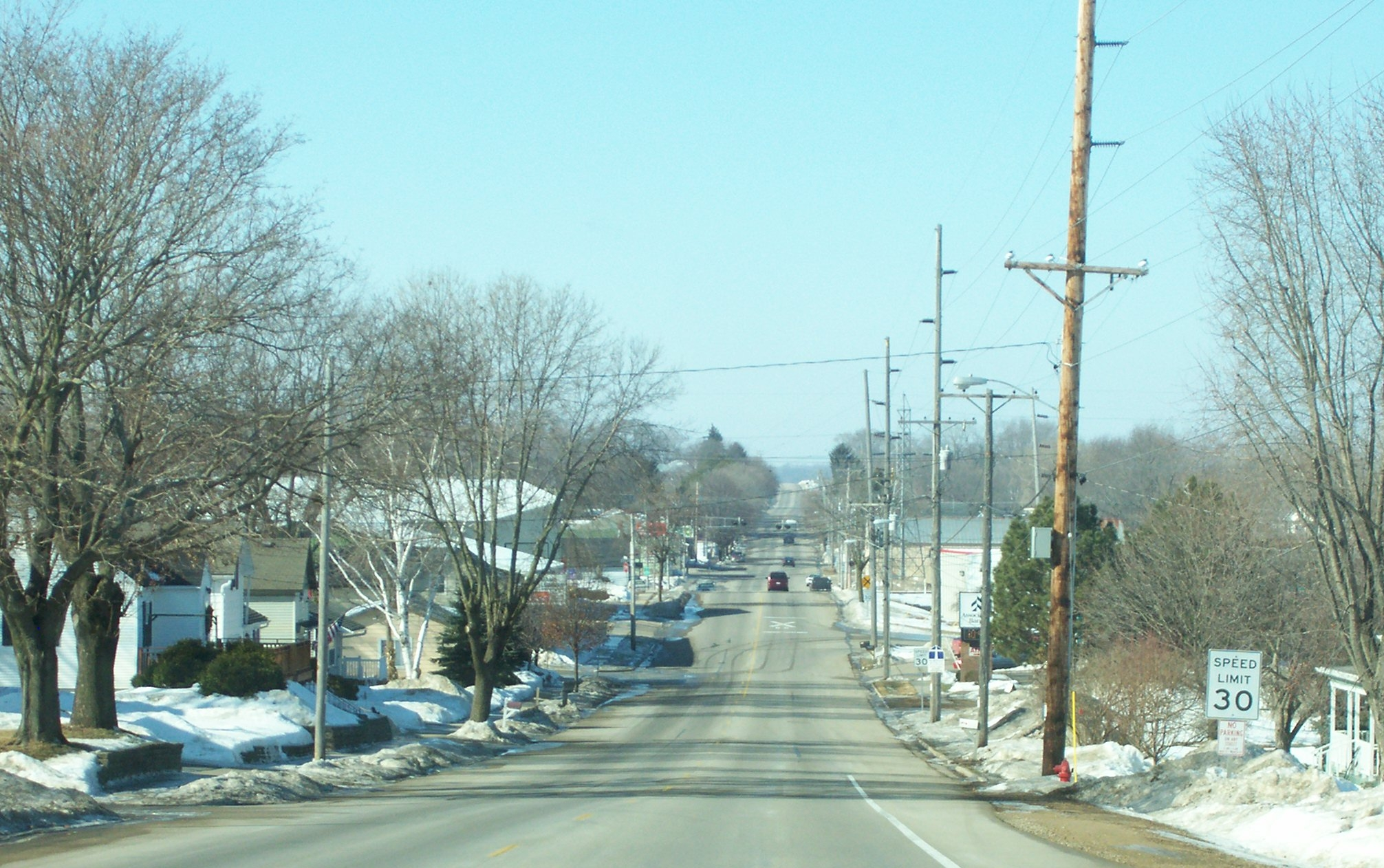
Dane on Wisconsin Highway 113

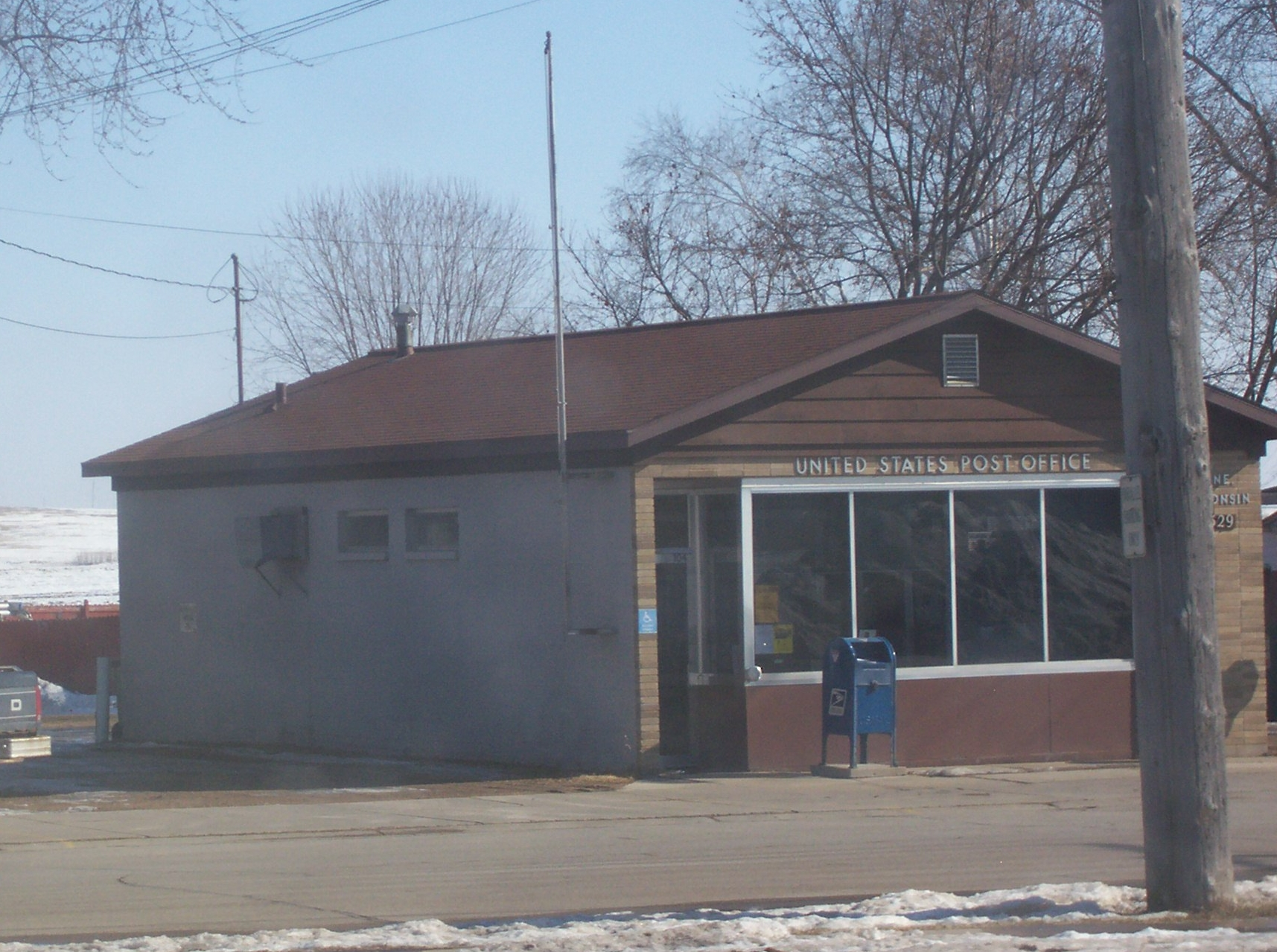
Post office

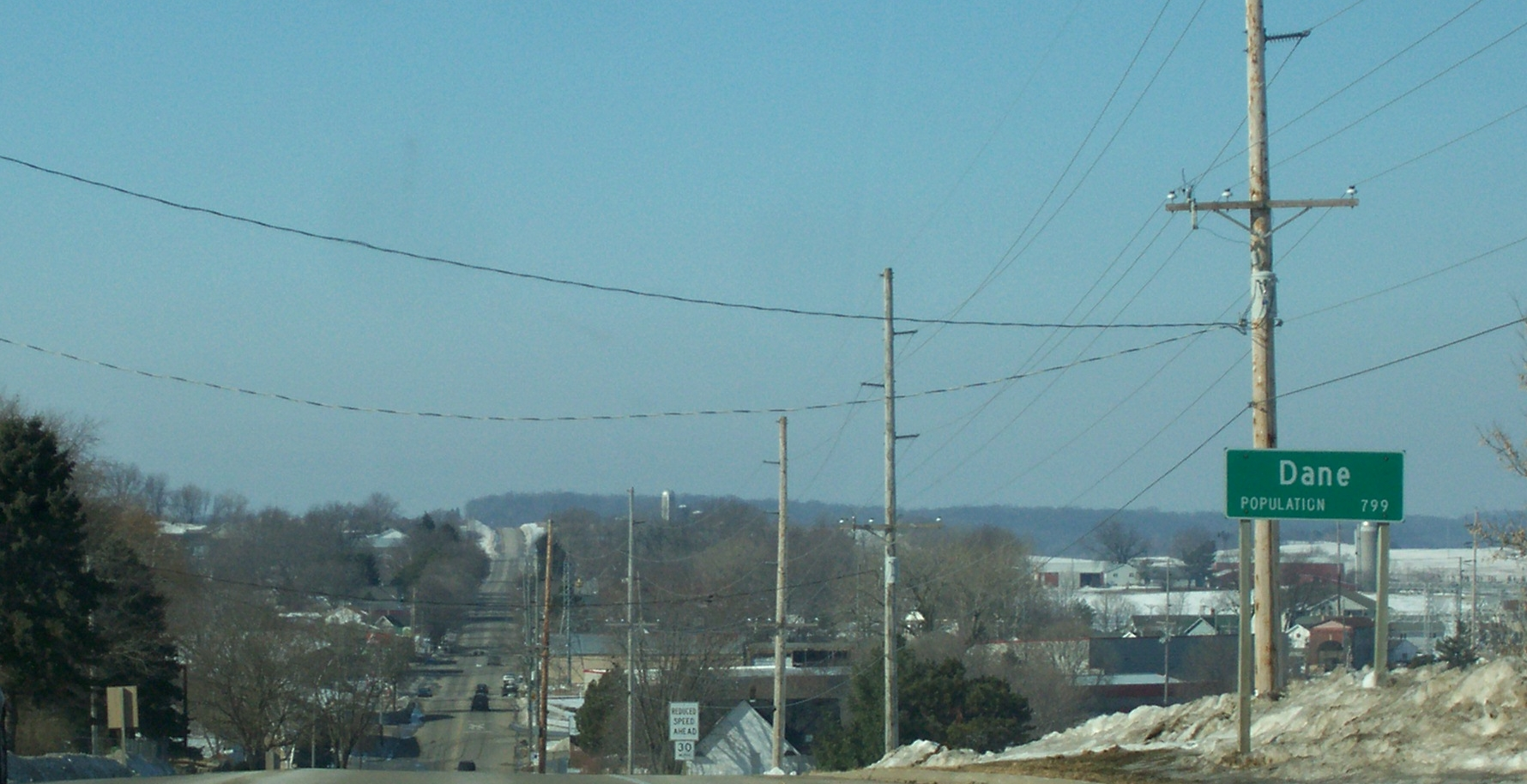
Welcome sign

=== 2010 census ===
As of the census of 2010, there were 995 people, 363 households, and 266 families living in the village. The population density was 880.5 inhabitants per square mile (340.0/km^{2}). There were 373 housing units at an average density of 330.1 units per square mile (127.5 units/km^{2}). The racial makeup of the village was 94.7% White, 0.8% African American, 0.1% Native American, 1.7% Asian, 2.1% from other races, and 0.6% from two or more races. Hispanic or Latino of any race were 4.3% of the population.

There were 363 households, of which 43.8% had children under the age of 18 living with them, 59.0% were married couples living together, 7.4% had a female householder with no husband present, 6.9% had a male householder with no wife present, and 26.7% were non-families. 17.6% of all households were made up of individuals, and 4.1% had someone living alone who was 65 years of age or older. The average household size was 2.74 and the average family size was 3.14.

The median age in the village was 32.5 years. 29% of residents were under the age of 18; 8% were between the ages of 18 and 24; 32.5% were from 25 to 44; 22.4% were from 45 to 64; and 7.6% were 65 years of age or older. The gender makeup of the village was 52.8% male and 47.2% female.

=== 2000 census ===
As of the census of 2000, there were 799 people, 279 households, and 205 families living in the village. The population density was 705.6 people per square mile (272.4 people/km^{2}). There were 288 housing units at an average density of 254.3 units per square mile (98.2 units/km^{2}). The racial makeup of the village was 94.87% White, 0.38% Black or African American, 0.13% Native American, 2.38% Asian, 0.50% from other races, and 1.75% from two or more races. 1.88% of the population were Hispanic or Latino of any race.

There were 279 households, out of which 43.4% had children under the age of 18 living with them, 60.6% were married couples living together, 9.0% had a female householder with no husband present, and 26.5% were non-families. 16.5% of all households were made up of individuals, and 6.8% had someone living alone who was 65 years of age or older. The average household size was 2.86 and the average family size was 3.31.

In the village, the population was spread out, with 31.5% under the age of 18, 10.4% from 18 to 24, 36.9% from 25 to 44, 14.8% from 45 to 64, and 6.4% who were 65 years of age or older. The median age was 31 years. For every 100 females, there were 102.3 males. For every 100 females age 18 and over, there were 101.8 males.

The median income for a household in the village was $51,667, and the median income for a family was $56,250. Males had a median income of $34,792 versus $26,125 for females. The per capita income for the village was $18,533. About 3.8% of families and 5.4% of the population were below the poverty line, including 10.2% of those under age 18 and 9.3% of those age 65 or over.

== Infrastructure ==
=== Railroad ===
Wisconsin and Southern railroad runs through town en route to Reedsburg.

== Notable people ==
- Alfred Kunz, Catholic priest at St. Michael's Catholic Church (1967–1998)
