= Little Lord Fauntleroy (murder victim) =

Murder victim

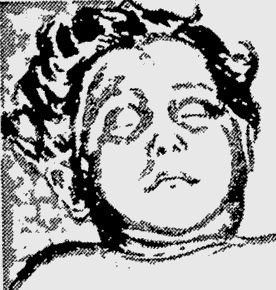
- Sketch of the victim
- Born: 1914–1916 (approximate)
- Status: Unidentified for 105 years, 5 months and 28 days
- Died: Autumn 1920 to February 1921 (aged 5–7)
- Cause of death: Homicide by blunt-force trauma
- Body discovered: March 8, 1921; Waukesha, Wisconsin
- Resting place: Prairie Home Cemetery, Waukesha, Wisconsin
- Height: 3 ft 6 in (1.07 m)

Little Lord Fauntleroy is the nickname for an unidentified American boy found murdered in Waukesha, Wisconsin, in 1921.

== Discovery ==
On March 8, 1921, the remains of a boy were found floating in a pond near the O'Laughlin Stone Company in Waukesha, Wisconsin. Authorities estimated he was between five and seven years old. He had blond hair, brown eyes, and a tooth missing from his lower jaw. He had been struck with a blunt instrument. The boy could have been in the water for several months. He was dressed in a gray sweater, Munsing underwear, black stockings, a blouse, and patent leather shoes; the clothing quality suggested the child was from an affluent family.

Police displayed his body at a local funeral home, trying to identify him; no one claimed the body. The boy was buried on March 17, 1921.

== Investigation ==
An employee of the O'Laughlin stone company said he had been approached by a couple five weeks before the body was found. The woman, who wore a red sweater, asked if he had seen a young boy in the area. She was reportedly crying. The man accompanying her was seen watching the area where the child was located. They later left in a Ford vehicle and have never been found.

A possible scenario for the case is that Little Lord Fauntleroy may have been abducted from a wealthy family in another location and disposed of somewhere else to prevent his identification. After the investigation halted, money was raised by a local woman, Minnie Conrad, for the child to be buried at Prairie Home Cemetery in Waukesha. She was buried in the same cemetery in 1940 after she died at the age of seventy-three.

There were sightings of a woman, wearing a heavy veil, who would occasionally place flowers on the boy's grave. Some have speculated that this woman knew the actual identity of Little Lord Fauntleroy.

== Homer Lemay ==
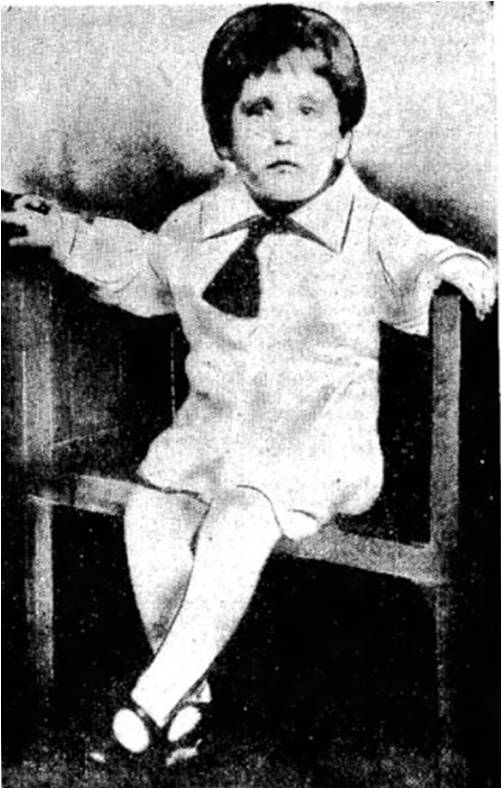
Homer Lemay was speculated to be the identity of Little Lord Fauntleroy

In 1949, a medical examiner from Milwaukee, Wisconsin, suggested that investigators felt there may have been a connection between the unidentified boy and Homer Lemay, a six-year-old who disappeared around the same time the child died. Lemay was said by his father, Edmond, to have died in a vehicle accident during a trip to South America when he was being cared for by family friends (described as the "Nortons"), but there was no existing record of his death. Edmond Lemay stated that he learned of his son's death after receiving information from a South American newspaper that detailed the accident. He also was accused of falsifying his wife's signature while she was missing but was later found not guilty. Detectives were unable to find any information about such an event or even the existence of the two Nortons.

== See also ==
- Arthur "Buddy" Schumacher
- List of unsolved murders (1900–1979)
- Little Lord Fauntleroy
