= Index of Wisconsin-related articles =

The location of the state of Wisconsin in the United States of America

The following is an alphabetical list of articles related to the U.S. state of Wisconsin.

== 0–9 ==
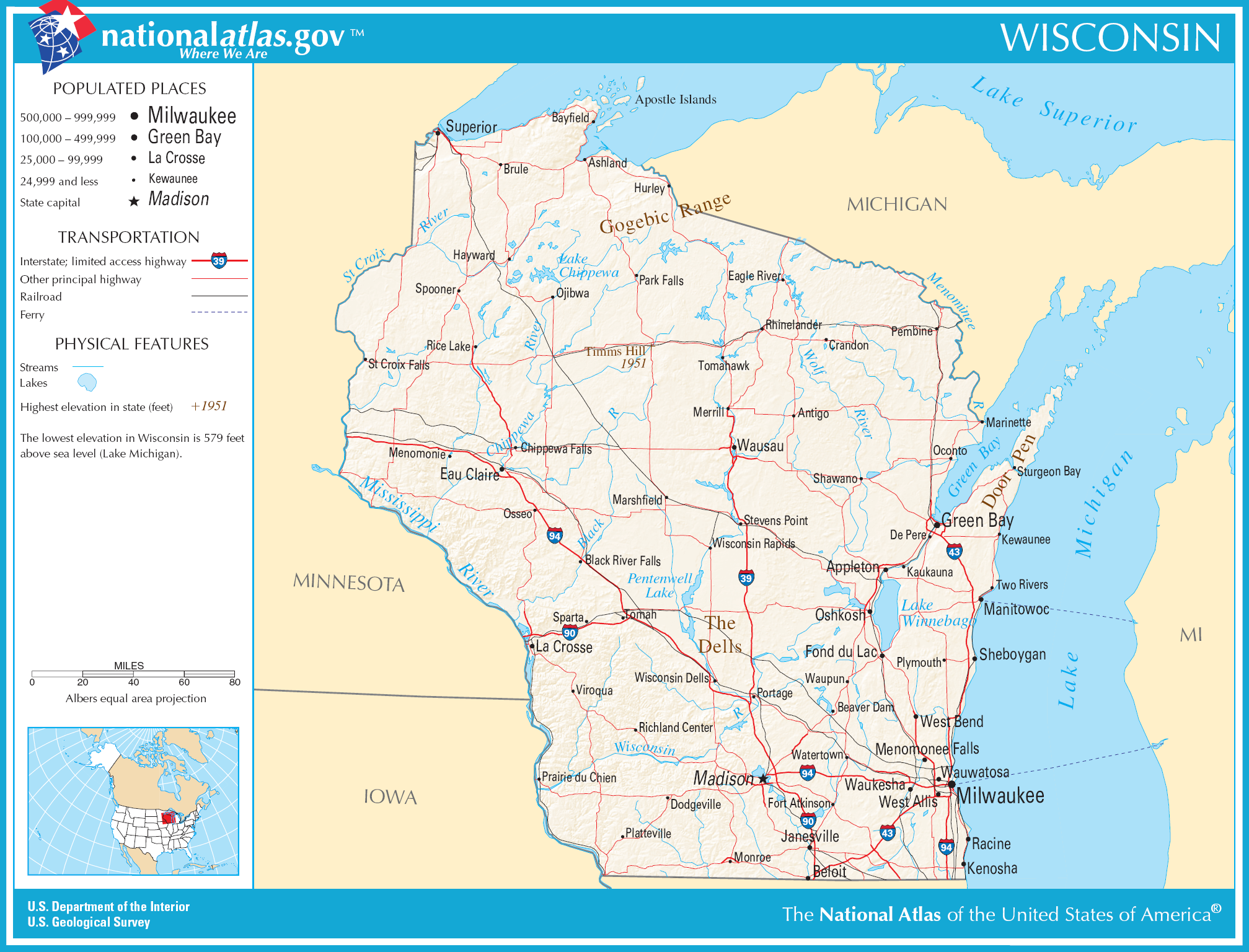
An enlargeable map of the state of Wisconsin

- .wi.us – Internet second-level domain for the state of Wisconsin
- 30th State to join the United States of America

== A ==
- Adjacent states:
  - State of Illinois
  - State of Iowa
  - State of Michigan
  - State of Minnesota
- Agriculture in Wisconsin
- Airports in Wisconsin
- Amusement parks in Wisconsin
- Arboreta in Wisconsin
  - commons:Category:Arboreta in Wisconsin
- Archaeology in Wisconsin
  - Category:Archaeological sites in Wisconsin
    - commons:Category:Archaeological sites in Wisconsin
- Architecture in Wisconsin
- Area codes in Wisconsin
- Art museums and galleries in Wisconsin
  - commons:Category:Art museums and galleries in Wisconsin
- Astronomical observatories in Wisconsin
  - commons:Category:Astronomical observatories in Wisconsin
- Wisconsin State Assembly
- Attorney General of the State of Wisconsin
- Axley Brynelson, LLP

== B ==
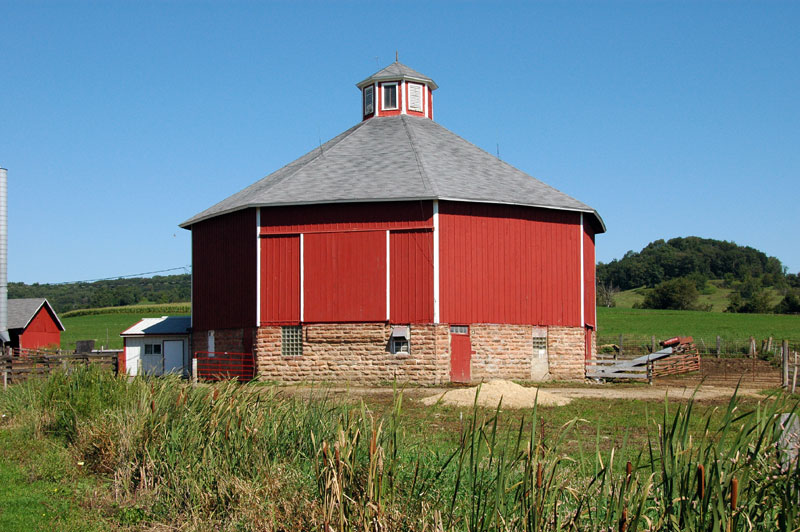
Octagonal dairy barn, Plain

- Badger Army Ammunition Plant
- Bannered highway routes in Wisconsin
- Beer
- Belmont, Wisconsin, territorial capital 1836-1837
- Botanical gardens in Wisconsin
  - commons:Category:Botanical gardens in Wisconsin
- Buildings and structures in Wisconsin
  - commons:Category:Buildings and structures in Wisconsin

== C ==
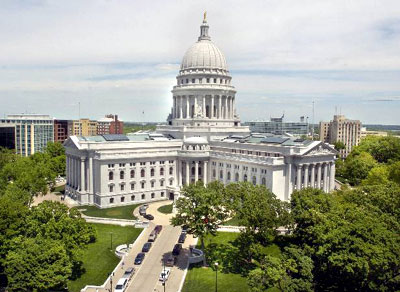
The Wisconsin State Capitol in Madison

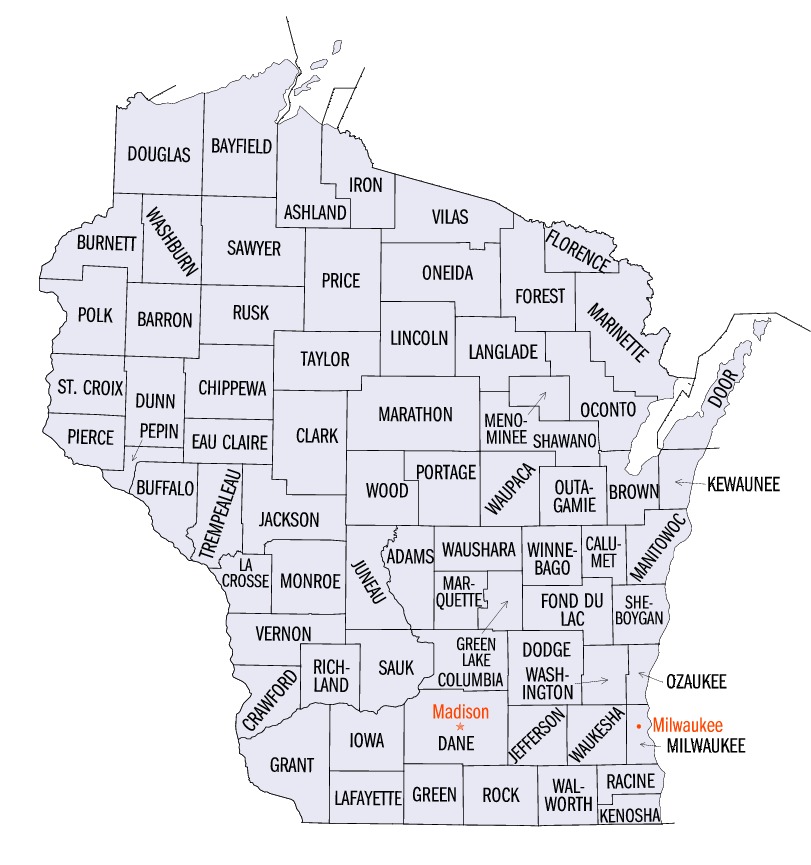
An enlargeable map of the 72 counties of the State of Wisconsin

- Capital of the State of Wisconsin
- Capitol of the State of Wisconsin
  - commons:Category:Wisconsin State Capitol
- Casinos in Wisconsin
- Caves of Wisconsin
  - commons:Category:Caves of Wisconsin
- Cheese
- Census statistical areas of Wisconsin
- Chicago-Naperville-Joliet, IL-IN-WI Metropolitan Statistical Area
- Chicago-Naperville-Michigan City, IL-IN-WI Combined Statistical Area
- Cities in Wisconsin
  - commons:Category:Cities in Wisconsin
- Civil War regiments from Wisconsin
- Climate change in Wisconsin
- Climate of Wisconsin
  - Category:Climate of Wisconsin
    - commons:Category:Climate of Wisconsin
- Colleges and universities in Wisconsin
  - commons:Category:Universities and colleges in Wisconsin
- Communications in Wisconsin
  - commons:Category:Communications in Wisconsin
- Companies in Wisconsin
- Congressional districts of Wisconsin
- Constitution of the State of Wisconsin
- Convention centers in Wisconsin
  - commons:Category:Convention centers in Wisconsin
- Counties of the State of Wisconsin
  - commons:Category:Counties in Wisconsin
- County Executives in Wisconsin
- County trunk highways in Wisconsin
- Culture of Wisconsin
  - commons:Category:Wisconsin culture

== D ==
- Wisconsin dairy industry
- Democratic Party of Wisconsin
- Demographics of Wisconsin
- List of dry communities by U.S. state § Wisconsin

== E ==
- Economy of Wisconsin
  - Category:Economy of Wisconsin
    - commons:Category:Economy of Wisconsin
- Education in Wisconsin
  - Category:Education in Wisconsin
    - commons:Category:Education in Wisconsin
- Elections in Wisconsin
  - Category:Elections in Wisconsin
    - commons:Category:Elections in Wisconsin
- Environment of Wisconsin
  - commons:Category:Environment of Wisconsin

== F ==
The Flag of the State of Wisconsin

- Festivals in Wisconsin
  - commons:Category:Festivals in Wisconsin
- Flag of the State of Wisconsin
- Football
- Forts in Wisconsin
  - Category:Forts in Wisconsin
    - commons:Category:Forts in Wisconsin

== G ==
The Great Seal of the State of Wisconsin

- Geography of Wisconsin
  - Category:Geography of Wisconsin
    - commons:Category:Geography of Wisconsin
- Geology of Wisconsin
  - commons:Category:Geology of Wisconsin
- Gun laws in Wisconsin
- Ghost towns in Wisconsin
  - Category:Ghost towns in Wisconsin
    - commons:Category:Ghost towns in Wisconsin
- Golf clubs and courses in Wisconsin
- Government of the State of Wisconsin website
  - Category:Government of Wisconsin
    - commons:Category:Government of Wisconsin
- Governor of the State of Wisconsin
  - List of governors of Wisconsin
- Great Seal of the State of Wisconsin
- Green Bay Packers

== H ==
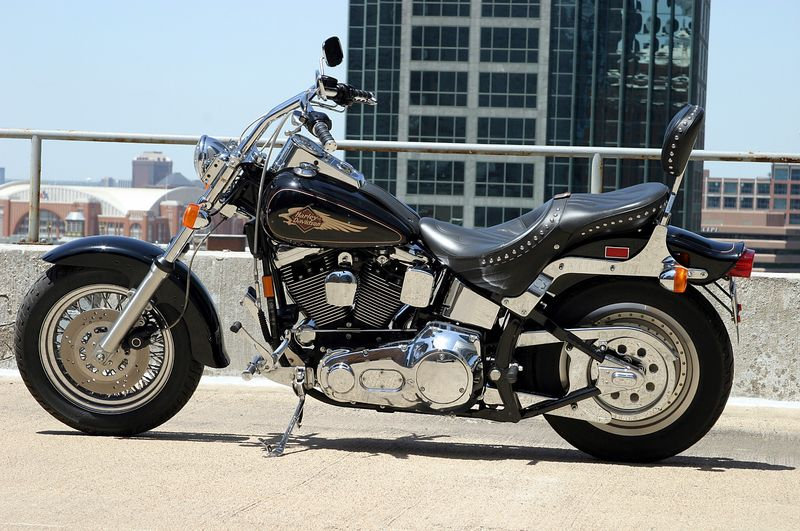
Harley-Davidson motorcycle

- Harley-Davidson Motor Company, Milwaukee
- Heritage railroads in Wisconsin
  - commons:Category:Heritage railroads in Wisconsin
- High schools of Wisconsin
- Higher education in Wisconsin
- Hiking trails in Wisconsin
  - commons:Category:Hiking trails in Wisconsin
- History of Wisconsin
  - Historical outline of Wisconsin
    - Category:History of Wisconsin
      - commons:Category:History of Wisconsin
- Hospitals in Wisconsin
- Housing in Wisconsin
  - Category:Housing in Wisconsin

== I ==
- Images of Wisconsin
  - commons:Category:Wisconsin
- Islands of Wisconsin

== K ==
- Kettle Moraine Scenic Drive

== L ==
Great Lakes

- Lakes of Wisconsin
  - Lake Michigan
  - Lake Superior
  - commons:Category:Lakes of Wisconsin
- Landforms of Wisconsin
- Landmarks in Wisconsin
  - commons:Category:Landmarks in Wisconsin
- Libertarian Party of Wisconsin
- Lighthouses in Wisconsin
- Lieutenant Governor of the State of Wisconsin
- Lists related to the State of Wisconsin:
  - List of airports in Wisconsin
  - List of census statistical areas in Wisconsin
  - List of birds of Wisconsin
  - List of cities in Wisconsin
  - List of Civil War regiments from Wisconsin
  - List of colleges and universities in Wisconsin
  - List of counties in Wisconsin
  - List of dams and reservoirs in Wisconsin
  - List of forts in Wisconsin
  - List of ghost towns in Wisconsin
  - List of governors of Wisconsin
  - List of high schools in Wisconsin
  - List of hospitals in Wisconsin
  - List of islands of Wisconsin
  - List of lakes in Wisconsin
  - List of law enforcement agencies in Wisconsin
  - List of lieutenant governors of Wisconsin
  - List of museums in Wisconsin
  - List of National Historic Landmarks in Wisconsin
  - List of newspapers in Wisconsin
  - List of people from Wisconsin
  - List of power stations in Wisconsin
  - List of radio stations in Wisconsin
  - List of railroads in Wisconsin
  - List of Registered Historic Places in Wisconsin
  - List of rivers of Wisconsin
  - List of school districts in Wisconsin
  - List of state forests in Wisconsin
  - List of state parks in Wisconsin
  - List of state prisons in Wisconsin
  - List of symbols of the State of Wisconsin
  - List of telephone area codes in Wisconsin
  - List of television shows set in Wisconsin
  - List of television stations in Wisconsin
  - List of towns in Wisconsin
  - List of Wisconsin's congressional delegations
  - List of United States congressional districts in Wisconsin
  - List of United States representatives from Wisconsin
  - List of United States senators from Wisconsin
  - List of villages in Wisconsin

== M ==
- Madison, Wisconsin, territorial and state capital since 1838
- Maps of Wisconsin
  - commons:Category:Maps of Wisconsin
- Mass media in Wisconsin
- Milwaukee, Wisconsin
- Mississippi River
- Monuments and memorials in Wisconsin
  - commons:Category:Monuments and memorials in Wisconsin
- Museums in Wisconsin
  - Category:Museums in Wisconsin
    - commons:Category:Museums in Wisconsin
- Music of Wisconsin
  - Category:Music of Wisconsin
    - commons:Category:Music of Wisconsin
  - Category:Musical groups from Wisconsin
  - Category:Musicians from Wisconsin

== N ==
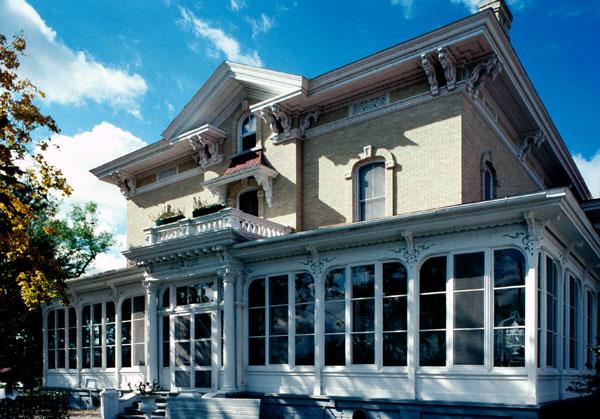
Villa Louis, Prairie du Chien, a National Historic Landmark

- National forests of Wisconsin
  - commons:Category:National Forests of Wisconsin
- Native American tribes in Wisconsin
- Natural arches of Wisconsin
  - commons:Category:Natural arches of Wisconsin
- Natural gas pipelines in Wisconsin
- National Historic Landmarks in Wisconsin
- Natural history of Wisconsin
  - commons:Category:Natural history of Wisconsin
- The New North
- Newspapers of Wisconsin

== O ==
- Outdoor sculptures in Wisconsin
  - commons:Category:Outdoor sculptures in Wisconsin

== P ==
- People from Wisconsin
  - Category:People from Wisconsin
    - commons:Category:People from Wisconsin
    - Category:People from Wisconsin by populated place
    - Category:People from Wisconsin by county
    - Category:People from Wisconsin by occupation
- Politics of Wisconsin
  - commons:Category:Politics of Wisconsin
  - Democratic Party of Wisconsin
  - Libertarian Party of Wisconsin
  - Republican Party of Wisconsin
  - Social-Democratic Party of Wisconsin
- Power stations in Wisconsin
- Protected areas of Wisconsin
  - commons:Category:Protected areas of Wisconsin

== R ==
- Radio stations in Wisconsin
- Railroad museums in Wisconsin
  - commons:Category:Railroad museums in Wisconsin
- Railroads in Wisconsin
- Registered historic places in Wisconsin
  - commons:Category:Registered Historic Places in Wisconsin
- Religion in Wisconsin
  - Category:Religion in Wisconsin
    - commons:Category:Religion in Wisconsin
- Repopulation of wolves in Midwestern United States
- Republican Party of Wisconsin
- Rivers of Wisconsin
  - commons:Category:Rivers of Wisconsin
- Rock formations in Wisconsin
  - commons:Category:Rock formations in Wisconsin
- Rustic roads in Wisconsin

== S ==
- School districts of Wisconsin
- Scouting in Wisconsin
- Wisconsin State Senate
- Settlements in Wisconsin
- Former settlements in Wisconsin
  - Cities in Wisconsin
  - Towns in Wisconsin
  - Villages in Wisconsin
  - Census Designated Places in Wisconsin
  - Former Census Designated Places in Wisconsin
  - Other unincorporated communities in Wisconsin
  - List of ghost towns in Wisconsin
- Ski areas and resorts in Wisconsin
  - commons:Category:Ski areas and resorts in Wisconsin
- Social-Democratic Party of Wisconsin
- Solar power in Wisconsin
- Sports in Wisconsin
  - Category:Sports in Wisconsin
    - commons:Category:Sports in Wisconsin
  - Category:Sports venues in Wisconsin
    - commons:Category:Sports venues in Wisconsin
- State Capitol of Wisconsin
- State highway routes in Wisconsin
- State of Wisconsin website
  - Constitution of the State of Wisconsin
  - Government of the State of Wisconsin
    - Category:Government of Wisconsin
      - commons:Category:Government of Wisconsin
  - Executive branch of the government of the State of Wisconsin
    - Governor of the State of Wisconsin
  - Legislative branch of the government of the State of Wisconsin
    - Legislature of the State of Wisconsin
      - Wisconsin State Senate
      - Wisconsin State Assembly
  - Judicial branch of the government of the State of Wisconsin
    - Supreme Court of the State of Wisconsin
- State Trunk Highway System
  - Interstate Highways in Wisconsin
  - U.S. Highways in Wisconsin
  - State Trunk Highways in Wisconsin
  - "Bannered" highways
- State parks of Wisconsin
  - commons:Category:State parks of Wisconsin
- State Patrol of Wisconsin
- State prisons of Wisconsin
- Structures in Wisconsin
  - commons:Category:Buildings and structures in Wisconsin
- Supreme Court of the State of Wisconsin
- Symbols of the State of Wisconsin
  - Category:Symbols of Wisconsin
  - commons:Category:Symbols of Wisconsin

== T ==
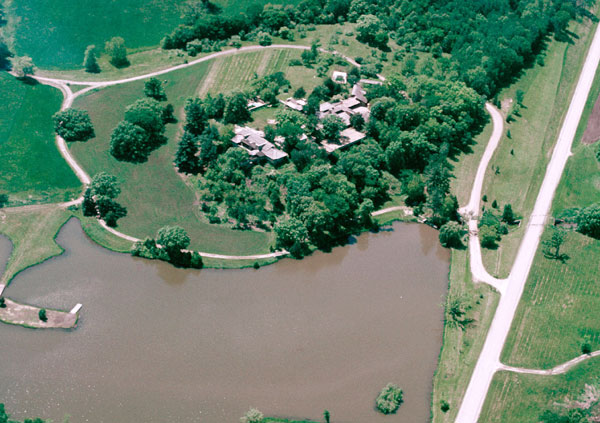
Aerial photograph of Taliesin, Spring Green

- Taliesin, Spring Green
- Telecommunications in Wisconsin
  - commons:Category:Communications in Wisconsin
- Telephone area codes in Wisconsin
- Television shows set in Wisconsin
- Television stations in Wisconsin
- Territory of Wisconsin
- Theatres in Wisconsin
  - commons:Category:Theatres in Wisconsin
- Tourism in Wisconsin website
  - commons:Category:Tourism in Wisconsin
- Towns in Wisconsin
  - commons:Category:Cities in Wisconsin
- Transportation in Wisconsin
  - Category:Transportation in Wisconsin
    - commons:Category:Transport in Wisconsin

== U ==
- United States of America
  - States of the United States of America
  - United States census statistical areas of Wisconsin
  - Wisconsin's congressional delegations
  - United States congressional districts in Wisconsin
  - United States Court of Appeals for the Seventh Circuit
  - United States District Court for the Eastern District of Wisconsin
  - United States District Court for the Western District of Wisconsin
  - United States representatives from Wisconsin
  - United States senators from Wisconsin
- Universities and colleges in Wisconsin
  - commons:Category:Universities and colleges in Wisconsin
- U.S. highway routes in Wisconsin
- US-WI – ISO 3166-2:US region code for the State of Wisconsin

== V ==
- Villages in Wisconsin

== W ==
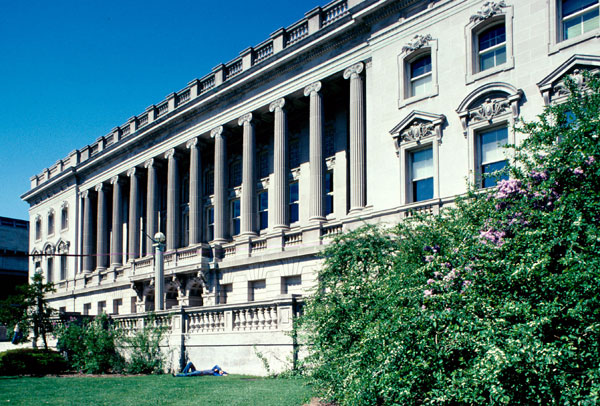
Wisconsin Historical Society

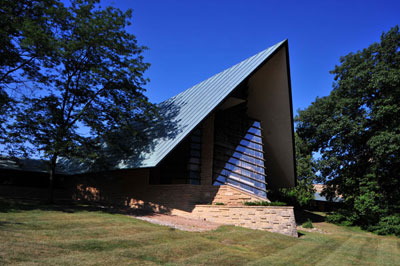
Frank Lloyd Wright's First Unitarian Society Meeting House, Madison

- Water parks in Wisconsin
- Waterfalls of Wisconsin
  - commons:Category:Waterfalls of Wisconsin
- WI – United States Postal Service postal code for the State of Wisconsin
  Wikimedia
  - Wikimedia Commons:Category:Wisconsin
    - commons:Category:Maps of Wisconsin
  - Wikinews:Category:Wisconsin
    - Wikinews:Portal:Wisconsin
  - Wikipedia Category:Wisconsin
    - Wikipedia:WikiProject Wisconsin
      - Category:WikiProject Wisconsin articles
      - Category:WikiProject Wisconsin participants
- Wind power in Wisconsin
- Wisconsin website
  - Category:Wisconsin
    - commons:Category:Wisconsin
      - commons:Category:Maps of Wisconsin
- Wisconsin Bio Industry Alliance
- Wisconsin Career Academy
- Wisconsin Circuit Court Access
- Wisconsin Cream City Chorus
- Wisconsin fishing records
- Wisconsin General Test Apparatus
- Wisconsin Historical Society
- Wisconsin Idea
- Wisconsin Institute of Certified Public Accountants
- Wisconsin Intercollegiate Athletic Conference
- Wisconsin Local History Collection
- Wisconsin Lutheran School
- Wisconsin Manufacturers & Commerce
- Wisconsin Ovarian Cancer Alliance
- Wisconsin–River Falls Falcons women's ice hockey
- Wisconsin Sea Grant
- Wisconsin Sports Minute
- Wisconsin State Capitol
- Wisconsin State Patrol
- Wisconsin Walleye War
- Wisconsin Virtual Learning
- Wisconsin WIC Association
- Wright, Frank Lloyd

== Z ==
- Zoos in Wisconsin
  - commons:Category:Zoos in Wisconsin

== See also ==
- Topic overview:
  - Wisconsin
  - Outline of Wisconsin
