= New North =

New North may refer to:

- New North Church (disambiguation)
- New North Road (disambiguation)
- New North Zone, in Chongqing, China
- The New North, a business consortium in northeast Wisconsin, US
- Acton–Northolt line, historically known as the New North Main Line

== See also ==
- Xinbei (disambiguation) (lit. New North)
