= Sister Bay, Wisconsin =

- Village
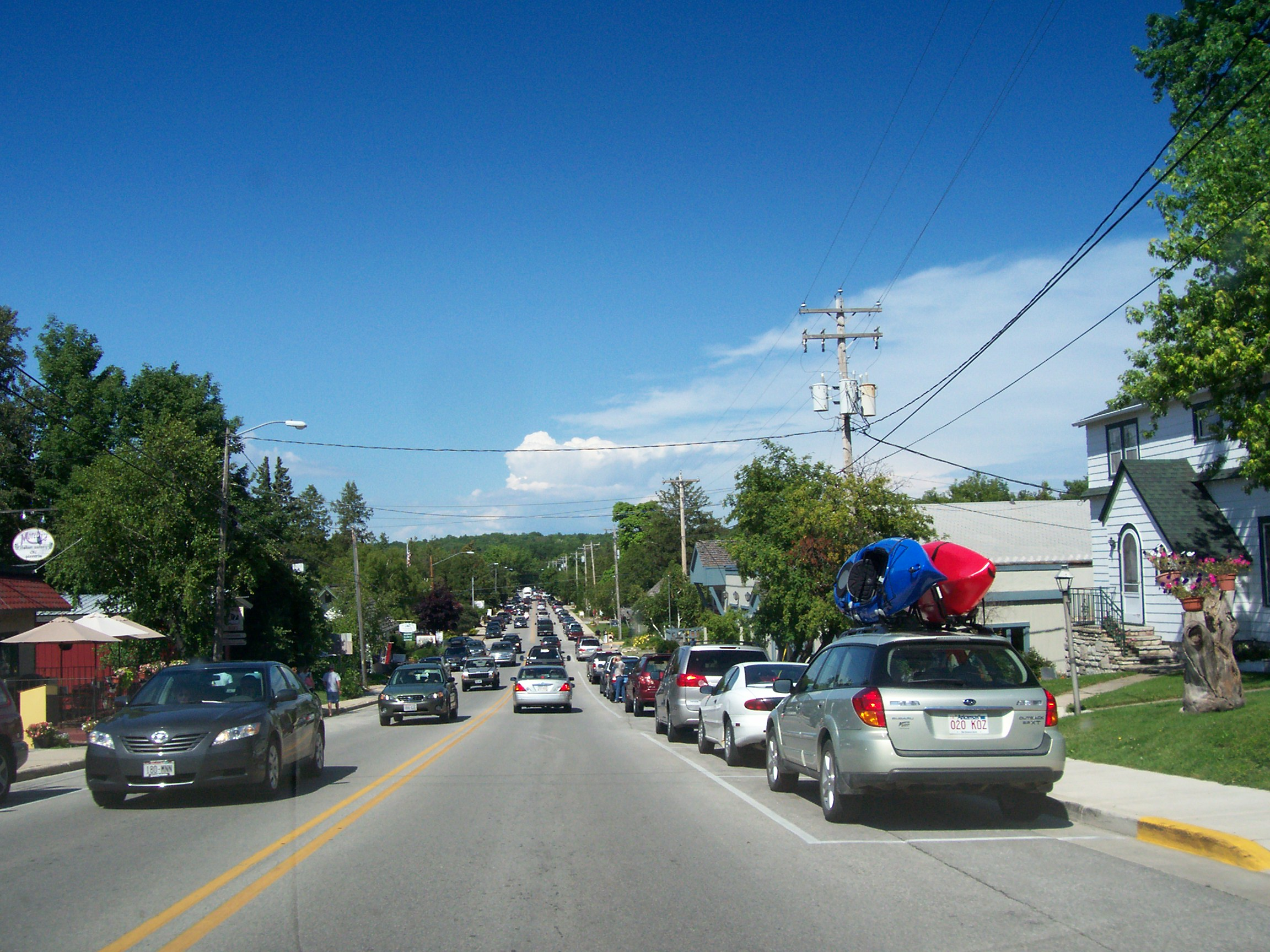
- Downtown Sister Bay on WIS 42

- Location of Sister Bay in Door County, Wisconsin.

- Location within Wisconsin Location within the United States
- Coordinates: 45°11′14″N 87°7′26″W
- Country: United States
- State: Wisconsin
- County: Door

Area
  - Total: 3.57 sq mi (9.25 km^{2})
  - Land: 2.58 sq mi (6.68 km^{2})
  - Water: 0.99 sq mi (2.57 km^{2})
- Elevation: 620 ft (189 m)

Population (2020)
  - Total: 1,148
  - Density: 445/sq mi (172/km^{2})
- Time zone: UTC-6 (Central (CST))
  - Summer (DST): UTC-5 (CDT)
- Area code: 920
- FIPS code: 55-74225
- GNIS feature ID: 1574209
- Website: sisterbay.com

Sister Bay is a village in Door County, Wisconsin, United States. The population was 1,148 at the 2020 census. It is situated along the shore of Green Bay on the Door Peninsula, a popular Upper Midwest vacation destination.

== Geography ==
According to the United States Census Bureau, the village has a total area of 3.58 square miles (9.27 km^{2}), of which 2.58 square miles (6.68 km^{2}) is land and 1.00 square mile (2.59 km^{2}) is water.

=== Climate ===
Sister Bay

Climate chart (precipitation, max. and min. temperature)
J	F	M	A	M	J	J	A	S	O	N	D
42 −4 −11	27 −2 −11	43 3 −6	71 10 0	82 16 6	81 22 12	75 25 15	75 25 15	82 20 11	86 13 5	58 6 −1	44 0 −6
- █ Average max. and min. temperatures in °C
- █ Precipitation totals in mm
Imperial conversion
J	F	M	A	M	J	J	A	S	O	N	D
1.6 26 12	1.1 28 13	1.7 37 22	2.8 49 33	3.2 62 43	3.2 72 54	2.9 77 60	3 76 59	3.2 69 52	3.4 55 41	2.3 43 31	1.7 32 21
- █ Average max. and min. temperatures in °F
- █ Precipitation totals in inches

== Demographics ==
Historical population
Census	Pop.	Note	%±
1920	190		—
1930	238		25.3%
1940	309		29.8%
1950	429		38.8%
1960	520		21.2%
1970	483		−7.1%
1980	564		16.8%
1990	675		19.7%
2000	886		31.3%
2010	876		−1.1%
2020	1,148		31.1%
U.S. Decennial Census

=== 2010 census ===
At the 2010 census, there were 876 people, 457 households and 217 families living in the village. The population density was 339.5 inhabitants per square mile (131.1/km^{2}). There were 1,335 housing units at an average density of 517.4 per square mile (199.8/km^{2}). The racial makeup of the village was 97.5% White, 0.7% African American, 0.1% Native American, 0.2% Asian, 1.0% from other races, and 0.5% from two or more races. Hispanic or Latino residents of any race were 3.1% of the population.

There were 457 households, of which 11.2% had children under the age of 18 living with them, 40.3% were married couples living together, 5.0% had a female householder with no husband present, 2.2% had a male householder with no wife present, and 52.5% were non-families. 47.3% of all households were made up of individuals, and 29.7% had someone living alone who was 65 years of age or older. The average household size was 1.75 and the average family size was 2.43.

The median age in the village was 62.7 years. 10.3% of residents were under the age of 18; 3.2% were between the ages of 18 and 24; 15% were from 25 to 44; 25.3% were from 45 to 64; and 46.2% were 65 years of age or older. The gender makeup of the village was 42.9% male and 57.1% female.

=== 2000 census ===
At the 2000 census, there were 886 people, 446 households and 224 families living in the village. The population density was 341.9 per square mile (132.1/km^{2}). There were 945 housing units at an average density of 364.7 per square mile (140.9/km^{2}). The racial makeup of the village was 98.42% White, 0.11% African American, 0.79% Native American, 0.23% Asian, 0.11% from other races, and 0.34% from two or more races. Hispanic or Latino of any race were 0.68% of the population.

There were 446 households, of which 11.4% had children under the age of 18 living with them, 46.0% were married couples living together, 3.6% had a female householder with no husband present, and 49.6% were non-families. 46.4% of all households were made up of individuals, and 28.7% had someone living alone who was 65 years of age or older. The average household size was 1.78 and the average family size was 2.45.

10.9% of the population were under the age of 18, 3.7% from 18 to 24, 13.4% from 25 to 44, 25.7% from 45 to 64, and 46.2% who were 65 years of age or older. The median age was 61 years. For every 100 females, there were 73.7 males. For every 100 females age 18 and over, there were 69.0 males.

The median household income was $33,224 and the median family income was $50,893. Males had a median income of $28,571 compared with $23,250 for females. The per capita income for the village was $25,029. About 1.4% of families and 3.5% of the population were below the poverty line, including none of those under age 18 and 3.6% of those age 65 or over.

== Education ==
Gibraltar Area Schools serves the community. Gibraltar Elementary School and Gibraltar Secondary School are the two schools.

== Historical landmarks ==
- Jischke's Meat Market
- Al Johnson's Swedish Restaurant
- The shipwreck site of the Meridian, a schooner that sank in 1873, is located off the coast of Sister Bay south of the Sister Islands.
- Country House Resort, was the first homestead in Sister Bay, Door County, Wisconsin. The Town of Liberty Grove was established at a meeting on this property in 1859.

== Transportation ==
=== State highways ===
- WIS 42 northbound travels to Ellison Bay, and Gills Rock, while southbound travels to Ephraim, Sturgeon Bay, and Manitowoc, where it connects to I-43.
- WIS 57 terminates in Sister Bay; southbound travels to Sturgeon Bay and Green Bay, where it connects to I-43.
Highway 42 runs along the upper portion of the photograph, while highway 57 bends towards the right and meets highway 42 in the upper right corner.

== Images ==
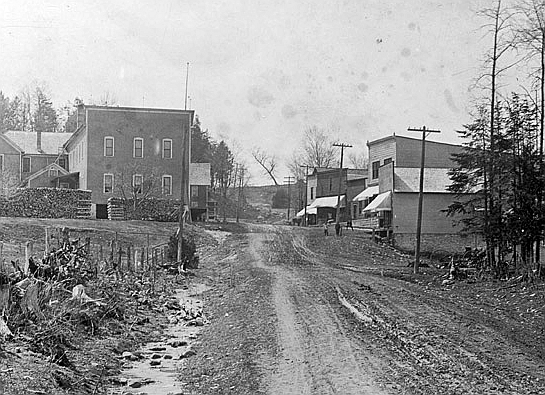
Sister Bay, circa 1912. Sister Bay Hotel is on left.

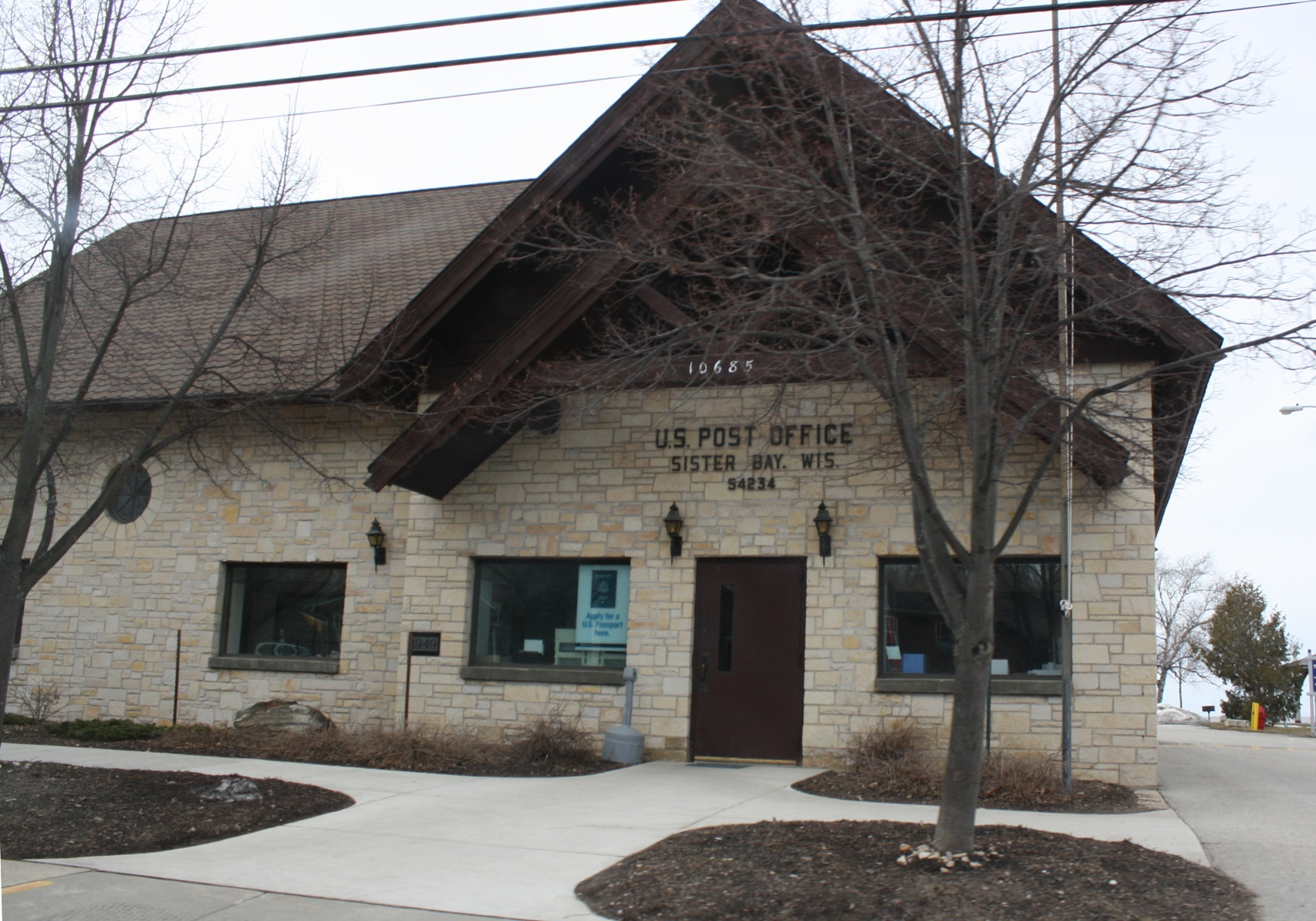
Post office

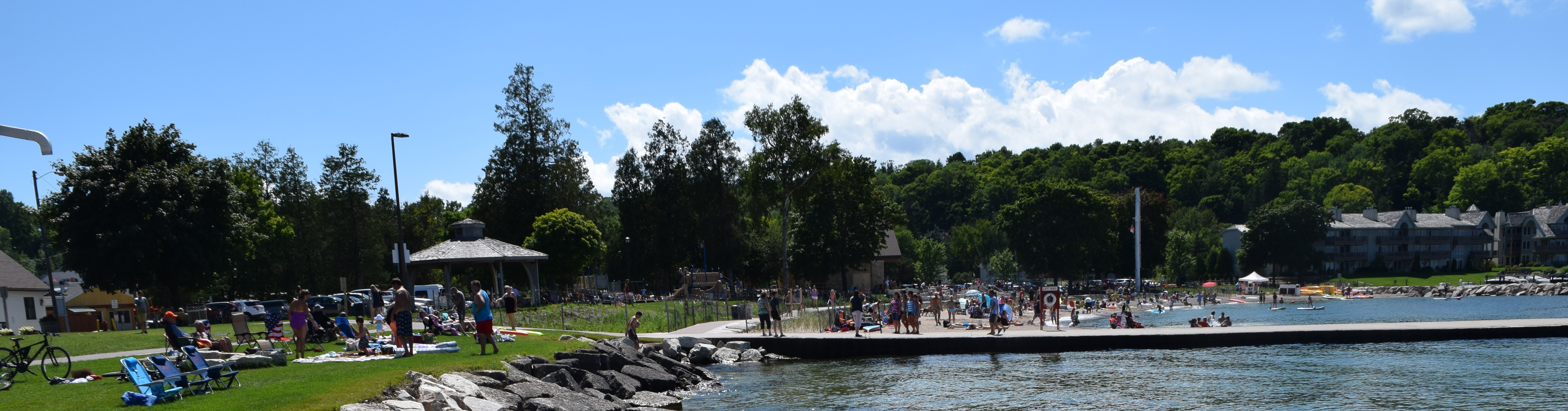
Sister Bay Beach; a study conducted from May through August 2019 found it was the most visited beach in the county.

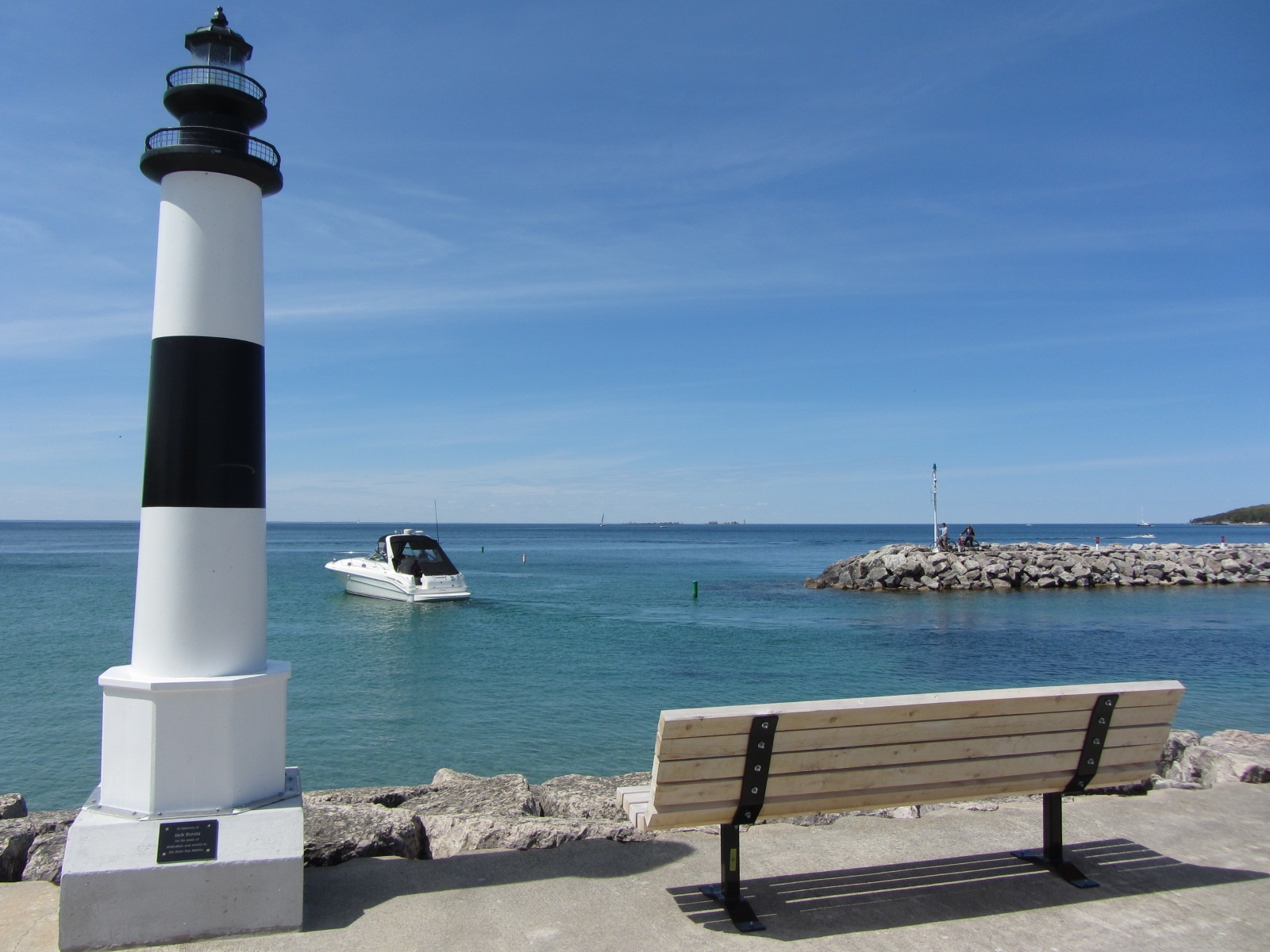
Breakwater for the Sister Bay Marina

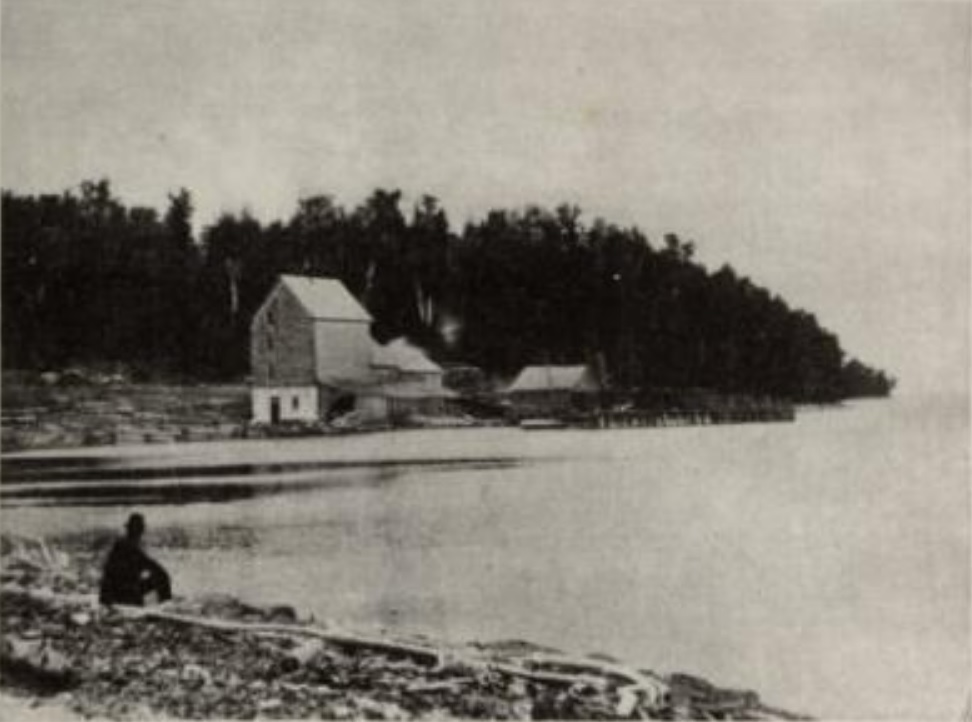
Sister Bay, published 1899

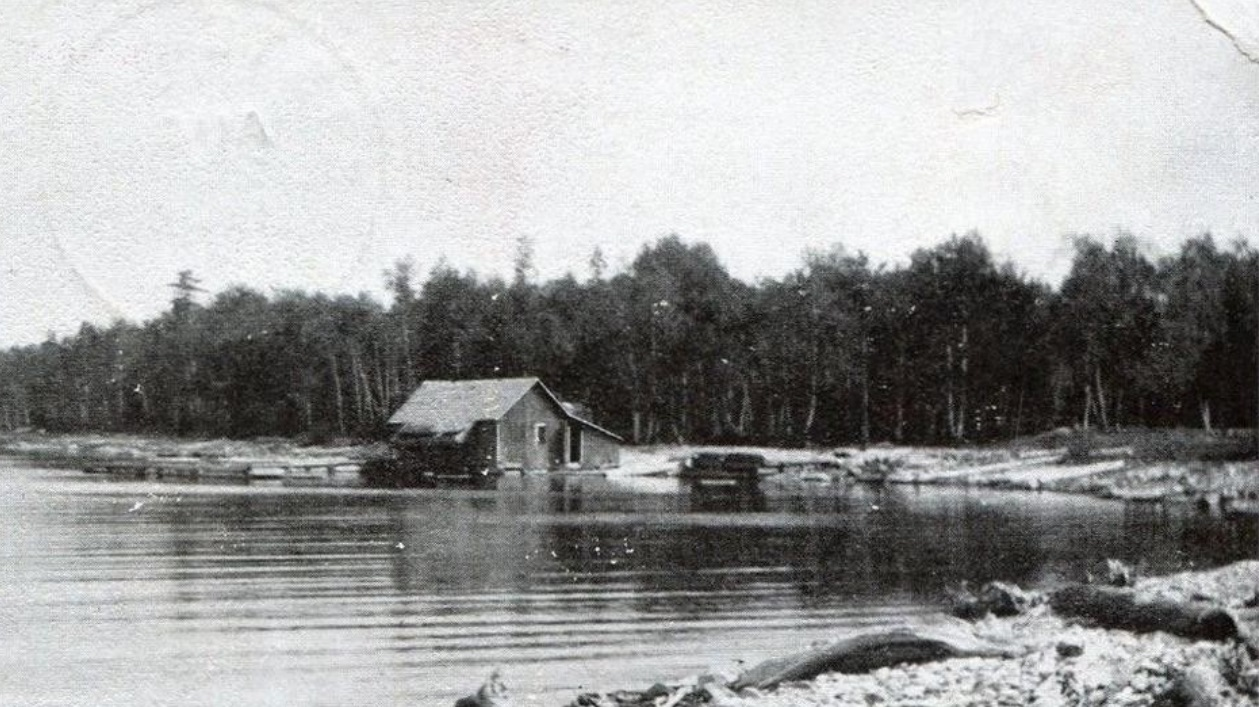
Pebble Beach at Little Sister Bay, postmarked 1904

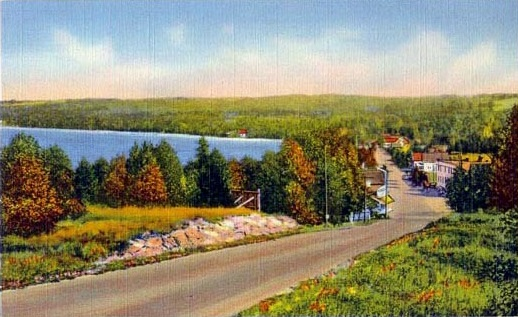
Postcard from around the 1930s or 1940s

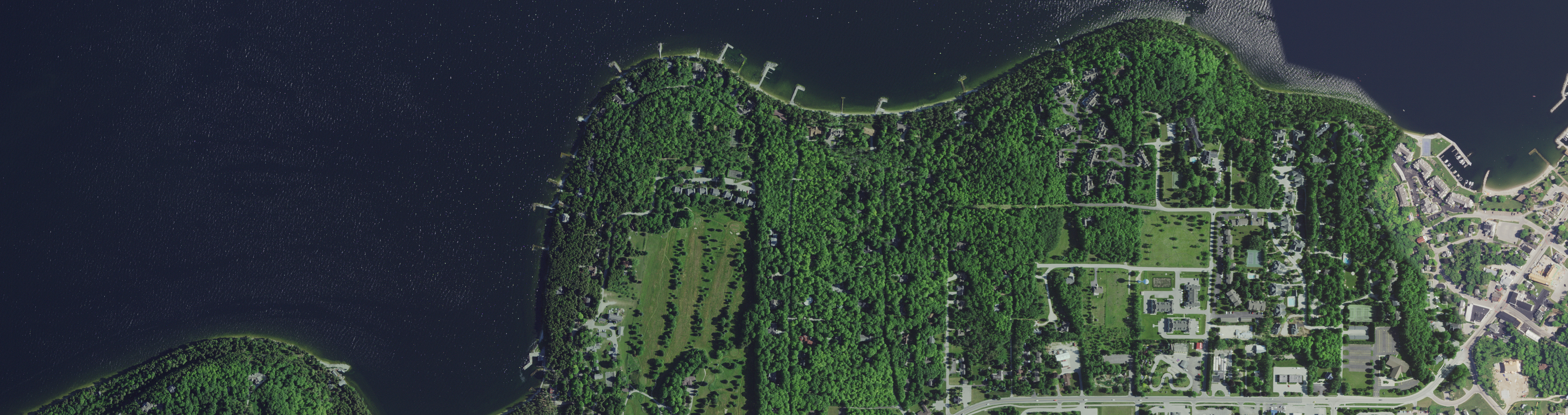
Northwestern side of the village
