= Axley =

Axley is a surname. Notable people with the surname include:

- Cheryl Axley (born 1959), American politician and attorney
- Eric Axley (born 1974), American golfer
- Samuel Axley Smith (1822–1863), American politician

== See also ==
- Axley Brynelson, LLP, law firm
