= WVL =

WVL may refer to:

- Wisconsin Virtual Learning, a charter school of the Northern Ozaukee School District
- WVL, the IATA code for Waterville Robert LaFleur Airport, Maine, United States
- WVL, the ICAO code for Wizz Air Bulgaria, a defunct Bulgarian airline
- WVL, the station code for Wyndham Vale railway station, Victoria, Australia
