= Meridian (shipwreck) =

Schooner that sank in Lake Michigan

- Meridian (schooner) Shipwreck Site
- U.S. National Register of Historic Places
- Location within Wisconsin Location within the United States
- Location: Lake Michigan off the coast of Sister Bay, Wisconsin south of the Sister Islands
- Coordinates: 45°12.01′N 87°10.10′W
- NRHP reference No.: 96000294
- Added to NRHP: March 21, 1996

The Meridian was a schooner that sank in Lake Michigan off Sister Bay, Wisconsin, south of the Sister Islands. In 1996, the shipwreck site was added to the National Register of Historic Places.

== History ==
The Meridian was built in Ohio in 1848. In 1849, it was reported by the Milwaukee Sentinel that the ship's second mate, James Bain, was killed aboard the vessel in an ensuing fight after he had attacked the captain and thrown the first mate overboard.

In October 1873, the Meridian left Milwaukee, Wisconsin and was bound for Oconto, Wisconsin. She was carrying no cargo at the time and it is presumed that it was intended for her to pick up lumber in Oconto. Along the way, the ship hit a violent storm that drove her off course. The vessel suffered extensive damage and eventually sank. Multiple attempts were made to recover the Meridian, but were unsuccessful.

In 1991, the Maritime Preservation and Archaeology Program of the Wisconsin Historical Society began surveying the site. The remnants of the Meridian are owned by the State of Wisconsin and the site is managed by the Wisconsin Historical Society and the Wisconsin Department of Natural Resources.
