= New North Church =

New North Church may refer to:

- New North Church, Boston
- New North Church, Edinburgh
  - West St Giles' Parish Church: known as the New North Church between the 18th and mid-19th centuries
  - New North Free Church: known as the New North Church between 1929 and its closure in 1941, now the Bedlam Theatre

== See also ==
- New North (disambiguation)
