= Jischke's Meat Market =

- U.S. National Register of Historic Places
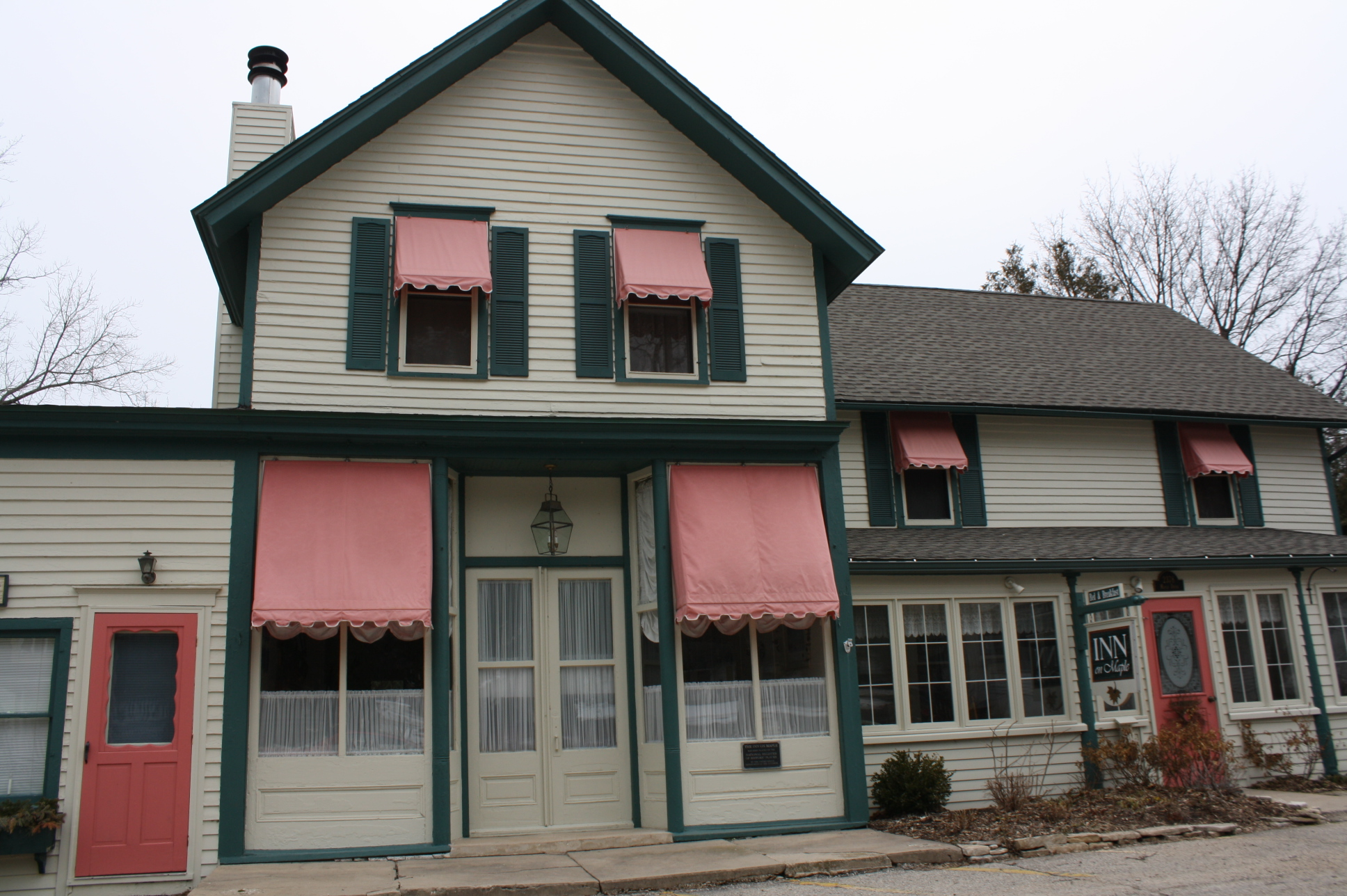

- Location within Wisconsin Location within the United States
- Location: 414 Maple Dr., Sister Bay, Wisconsin
- Coordinates: 45°11′16″N 87°7′26″W
- Area: less than one acre
- Built: 1902
- NRHP reference No.: 86002306
- Added to NRHP: September 11, 1986

Jischke's Meat Market is a historic building located at 414 Maple Dr. in Sister Bay, Wisconsin. Built in 1902, the building was originally a butcher shop run by Frank Jischke and his son M. J. The Jischkes were German immigrants who settled in Door County in 1892; they originally lived in Ephraim and later moved to Sister Bay. In addition to his work at the butcher shop, M. J. Jischke was a prominent citizen in Sister Bay who served as constable and postmaster.

The store is currently occupied by a bed and breakfast called Roots Inn and Kitchen. The inn uses the market as a gift shop and common area and has rooms in the Jischke's second floor living space.

The store was added to the National Register of Historic Places on September 11, 1986.
