= Xinbei =

Xinbei may refer to:

- Xinbei District (新北区), Changzhou, Jiangsu, People's Republic of China (PRC)
- New Taipei (新北市), special municipality in northern Taiwan, originally named Taipei County.
- Xinbei, Meizhou (新陂镇), town in Xingning, Guangdong, PRC

== See also ==
- New North (disambiguation)
