= Area code 414 =

Area code around Milwaukee, Wisconsin

Coordinates: 43°N 88°W

Map of Wisconsin showing area codes

Area code 414 is a telephone area code of the North American Numbering Plan for the area around and including the city of Milwaukee in the state of Wisconsin.

== History ==
The area code was created in October 1947, along with area code 715, as one of the two original area codes assigned to Wisconsin. The numbering plan area (NPA) originally included most of the southern and eastern Wisconsin, stretching from Lake Michigan to the Minnesota and Iowa borders. 715, then as now, covered the remaining northwestern part.

The numbering plan area was first split in 1955, when much of the western portion, including Madison, received area code 608. This configuration remained in place until July 26, 1997, when the northern half of NPA 414, including Green Bay and the Fox River Valley, became numbering plan area 920.

The creation of 920 was intended as a long-term solution, but within a year 414 was close to exhaustion once again due to the proliferation of cell phones and pagers. In 1998, the North American Numbering Plan Administration assigned area code 262 as a second area code for southeastern Wisconsin. The initial proposal called for 262 to be an overlay for the 414 territory. However, overlays were a new concept at the time, and met with considerable resistance due to the requirement for ten-digit dialing. As a result, effective September 25, 1999, the new area code was implemented as a geographic split, with nearly all of the old 414 territory outside of Milwaukee County transferring to 262.

Today, area code 414 covers all of Milwaukee County, including the city of Milwaukee. It also serves slivers of Waukesha County, including portions of Muskego and Brookfield, as well as the industrial "Ambrosia triangle" which is within the Milwaukee city limits. The Milwaukee portion of Washington County, mostly an industrial area, also stayed in 414 after the split.

Milwaukee is the center of one of the largest toll-free calling zones in the country. No long-distance charges are applied to calls within the 414 territory as well as calls to and from portions of the 262 territory, such as Racine, Waukesha, and Menomonee Falls. Despite the Milwaukee area's continued growth, 414 is nowhere near exhaustion. The latest projections did not list an exhaust date for 414, meaning that the Milwaukee area will not need another area code for at least 30 years.

Prior to October 2021, area code 414 had telephone numbers assigned for the central office code 988. In 2020, 988 was designated nationwide as a dialing code for the National Suicide Prevention Lifeline, which created a conflict for exchanges that permit seven-digit dialing. This area code was therefore scheduled to transition to ten-digit dialing by October 24, 2021.

== In popular culture ==
The area code gained infamy in 1983, when a gang of six Milwaukee-area teenagers, calling themselves The 414s, broke into several high-profile computer systems across the United States and Canada.

The City of Milwaukee officially started celebrating Milwaukee Day in 2009. It is celebrated on April 14, or "4/14", in honor of Milwaukee's area code. When the Milwaukee Brewers have a home game on the day at American Family Field, many of the tickets are priced at $4.14 in honor of the day to encourage attendance during April, when the season starts and games outside Opening Day outside rivalries are less attended. Due to the 2022 Major League Baseball season being delayed due to a lockout, that year's home opener against the rival St. Louis Cardinals occurred on April 14 (though with a reduced allocation of $4.14-priced tickets), and the game's first pitch was thrown at 4:14 p.m. Central.

The Milwaukee Bucks' new arena, Fiserv Forum, was nicknamed the "Four-One-Forum" by fans in an homage to the area code.

== See also ==
- List of Wisconsin area codes
- List of North American Numbering Plan area codes

Wisconsin area codes: 262, 414, 608/353, 715/534, 920/274
	North: 262	
West: 262	Area Code 414	East: Lake Michigan, 616
	South: 262	
Michigan area codes: 231, 248/947, 269, 313/679, 517, 586, 616, 734, 810, 906, 989
