= Al Johnson's Swedish Restaurant =

Restaurant in Sister Bay, Wisconsin, United States

Coordinates: 45°11′24″N 87°7′12″W

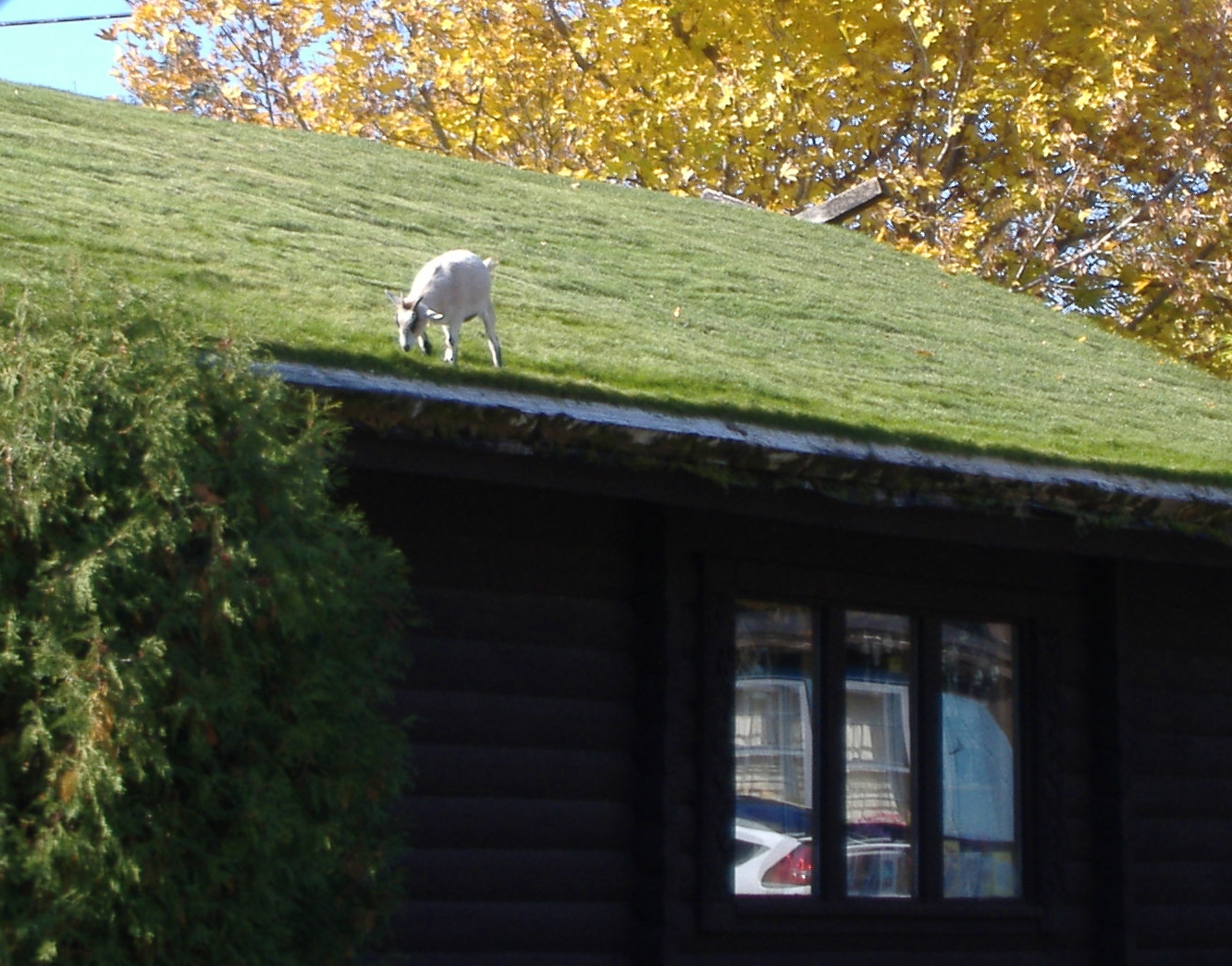
Goat grazing on roof

Al Johnson's Swedish Restaurant is a family-owned restaurant in Sister Bay, Wisconsin, known for its Swedish cuisine as well as for the goats that graze on the rooftop in the summer.

During the summer tourist season, the small town restaurant serves as many as 1,500 diners per day, which is more than Sister Bay's entire population of 1,016. To accommodate the influx, the staff includes foreign workers — about a quarter of its 119 workers are international students who work for about three months on J-1 visas. In 2026, processing delays on visas by the United States Department of State left Al Johnson's Swedish Restaurant kitchen staff nine people short, causing the general manager to work 100 hours per week.

== History ==
Axel Albert Otto (Al) Johnson, the founder, was born on the North Side of Chicago in 1925 and spent his childhood summers with family in Sweden, where he became fluent in Swedish and interested in Swedish culture. When he was older, he spent time working on a friend's strawberry farm in Door County, Wisconsin. During World War II, he was a paratrooper in the 101st Airborne. Johnson was one of the first American servicemen to enter the Auschwitz concentration camp after its liberation in 1945. He left the military in 1946 and attended Marquette University, during which time he worked at the dining counter at Woolworth's, which is where Johnson learned the system of wait staff shouting out orders to cooks rather than writing them on a pad. This is the system Al Johnson's Swedish Restaurant uses to this day.

Johnson left Milwaukee and returned to Door County and became a short-order cook at Johnny's Cottage Restaurant in Sister Bay.

In 1949, Johnson bought a building across the street that had been Hanson's IGA grocery store on Bay Shore Drive and opened a restaurant that he called Al's Home Cooking, now called Al Johnson's Swedish Restaurant & Butik.

On a 1973 trip to Norway with his wife Ingert Maria Forsber, he commissioned a log structure to be built in Norway, taken apart, shipped across the Atlantic Ocean, and reconstructed in Wisconsin by Norwegian carpenters, who added a sod roof. This new structure replaced the old restaurant. Ingert, who grew up in Österbymo, Sweden, redid the interior to resemble a traditional Scandinavian design. Ingert added a gift store called Al's Butik for restaurant patrons to shop for items with Nordic history while waiting for a table to dine.

In 1986, textile artist Carol Gresk designed the fabric for window curtains at the restaurant, featuring little goats perched atop a mountain of Swedish pancakes. She did not charge the Johnson family for this work as thanks for launching her career by selling her fabrics at the boutique attached to the restaurant.

Al Johnson died in June 2010. Today, three of Johnson's children as well as several grandchildren are involved in the business, which include the restaurant and Butik as well as newer operations such as Stabbur, a beer garden that opened in 2015, Kök, a quick-serve food service operation that opened in 2016, and SKÄL, a Nordic-inspired standalone store that opened in 2020.

== Goats and the Goat Cam ==
After the restaurant renovation in the 1970s, Johnson's friend Harold "Winkie" Larson gave him a pet goat for his birthday, named Oscar. Larson put the goat on the roof of the restaurant as a joke, which caught the attention of pedestrians and inspired Al to obtain additional goats to put on the roof as a marketing gimmick.

In 1996, the Johnsons registered the "Goats on the Roof" trademark with the United States Patent and Trademark Office, meaning that other competing restaurants in the United States may not use goats on their roofs in their marketing materials without permission. As a result, Tiger Mountain Market pays Al Johnson's Swedish Restaurant a fee for the right to promote roof goats at its locations in Georgia, South Carolina, North Carolina, and Tennessee. In Canada, the Johnsons' trademark does not apply, and the Old Country Market in Coombs, British Columbia, has had pygmy goats on its Norwegian-style rooftop since the 1970s.

The goats graze on the roof from 9 a.m. to 5 p.m. on sunny days from May to October, and there are roughly 30 goats that take turns in the grazing rotation.

The restaurant has two cameras that overlook the roof, allowing people to watch the goats. The goats are removed from the roof at night and when the temperature reaches 80 degrees. When they are not on the roof, the goats live on a 40-acre free-range property nearby run by the Johnson family.
