= Climate change in Wisconsin =

Climate change in the US state of Wisconsin

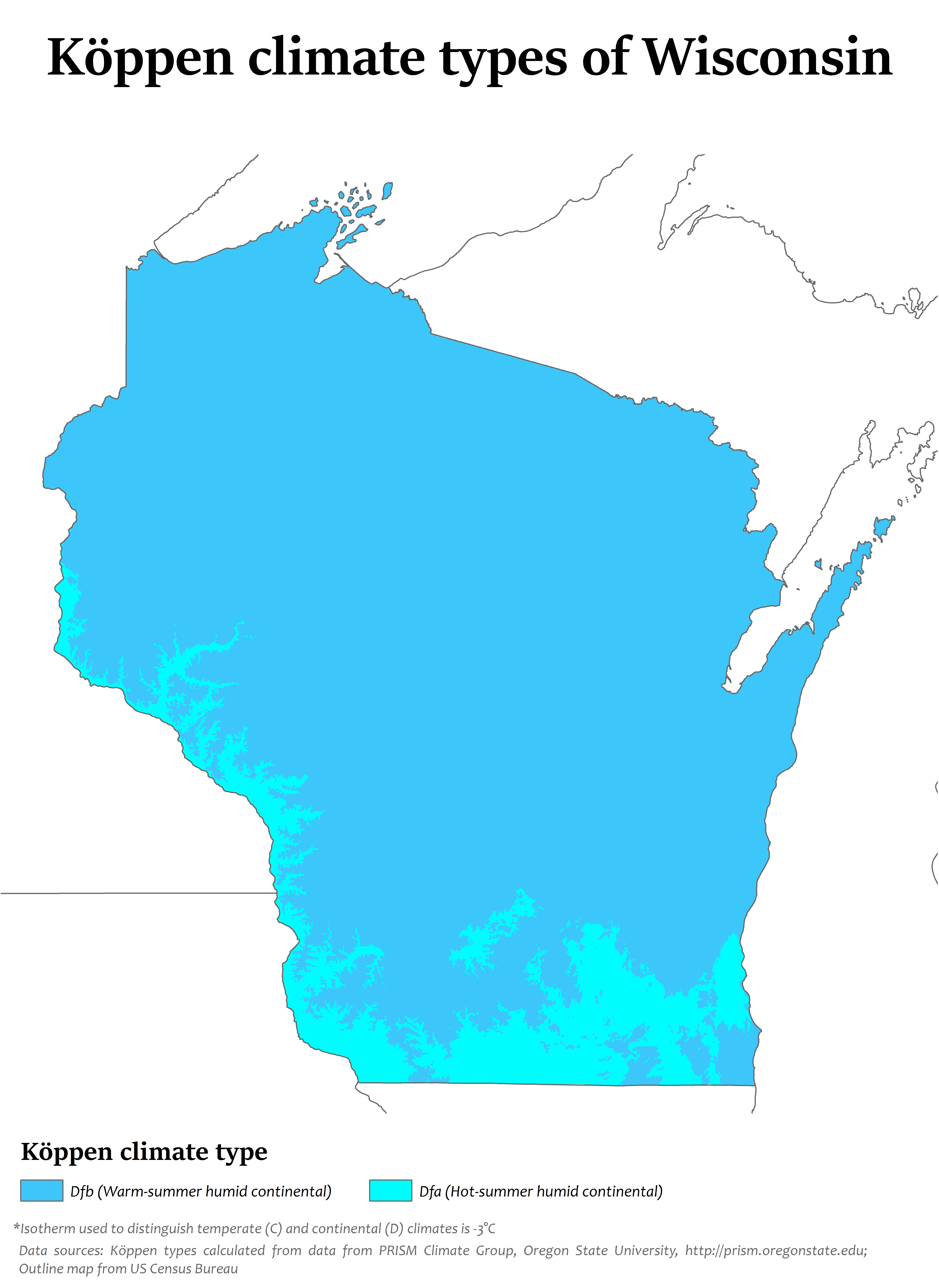
Köppen climate types in Wisconsin showing most of the state to be warm-summer humid continental.

Climate change in Wisconsin encompasses the effects of climate change attributed to man-made increases in atmospheric carbon dioxide, in the U.S. state of Wisconsin including the environmental, economic, and social impacts.

According to the United States Environmental Protection Agency, "Wisconsin's climate is changing. In the past century, most of the state has warmed about two degrees (F). Heavy rainstorms are becoming more frequent, and ice cover on the Great Lakes is forming later or melting sooner. In the coming decades, the state will have more extremely hot days, which may harm public health in urban areas and corn harvests in rural areas".

== Environmental impacts ==
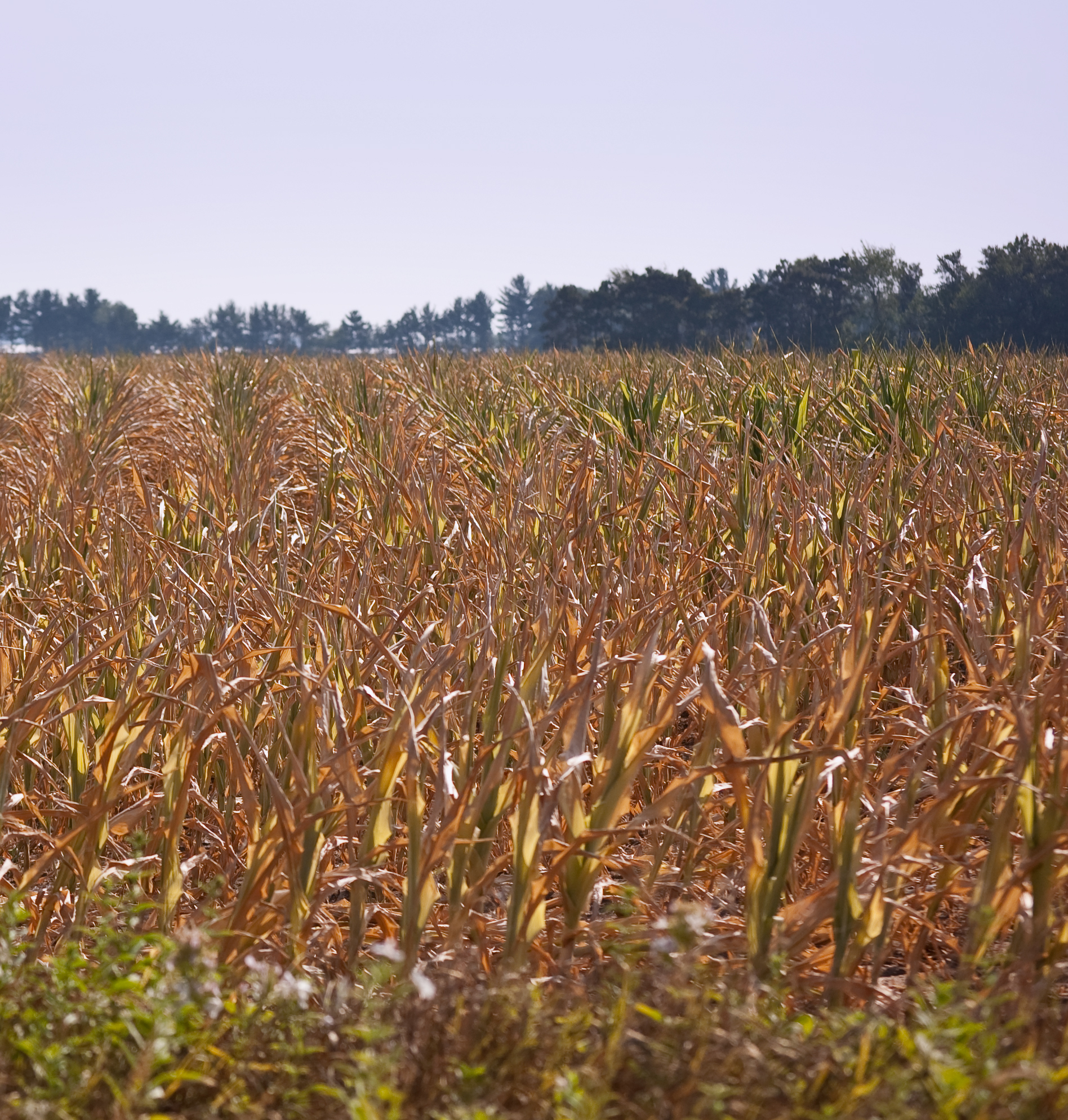
Drought in Iowa County, 2012

=== Heavy precipitation and flooding ===
As a result of the climate crisis, Wisconsin will become warmer and wetter in the future.

Flooding is projected to become more common in Wisconsin as the climate changes. In most of the Midwest, average annual precipitation has increased by 5 to 10% during the previous half-century. However, rainfall has increased by nearly 35% on the four wettest days of the year. Spring rainfall and yearly precipitation are predicted to rise during the next century, and violent rainstorms are anticipated to worsen. Each of these conditions will exacerbate the likelihood of flooding.

Flooding in Wisconsin can be very dangerous, in addition to the destruction of property, floods can also threaten the health of living beings. Hazardous chemicals can get into the water supply during a flood and therefore, expose living beings to different water-borne diseases. Along with the increased precipitation and flooding, there will be more frequent and severe storms across the state of Wisconsin. These storms will bring more rain in shorted periods of time not to mention an increase in tornadoes.

=== Ecosystems ===
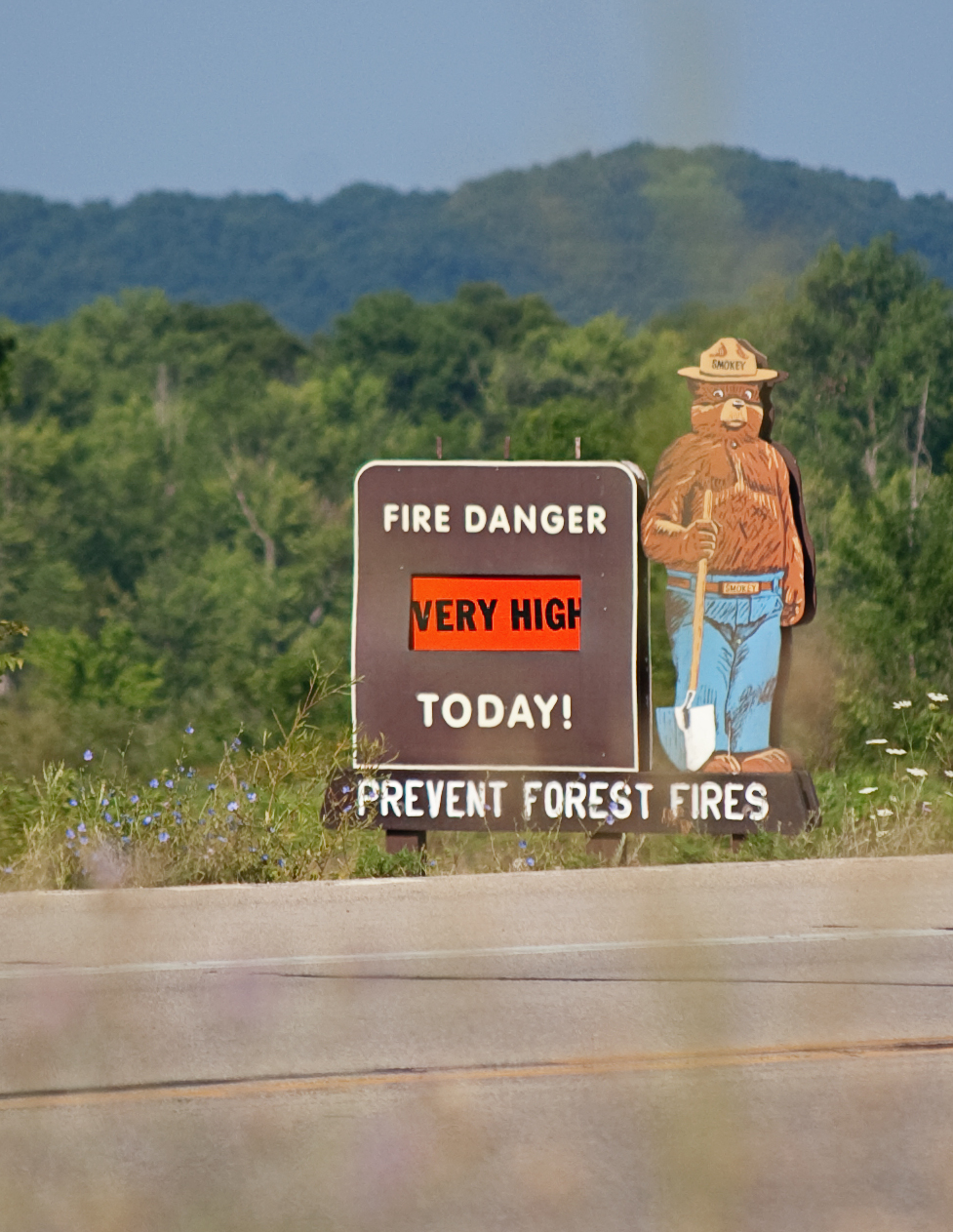
Fire warning during 2012 drought, Iowa County

"Changing the climate is likely to shift the ranges of plants and animals. For example, rising temperatures could change the composition of Wisconsin’s forests. As the climate warms, the populations of paper birch, quaking aspen, balsam fir, and black spruce may decline in the North Woods, while oak, hickory, and pine trees may become more numerous. Climate change will also affect habitat for animals such as fish. Rising water temperatures will increase the available habitat for warmwater fish such as bass, while shrinking the available habitat for coldwater fish such as trout. Declining ice cover and increasingly severe storms would harm fish habitat through erosion and flooding". Climate change is also reportedly causing mercury levels to fluctuate in fish caught in Wisconsin lakes, leading to increasingly unsafe levels of mercury.

"Warming could also harm ecosystems by changing the timing of natural processes such as migration, reproduction, and flower blooming. Migratory birds are arriving in the Midwest earlier in spring today than 40 years ago. Along with range shifts, changes in timing can disrupt the intricate web of relationships between animals and their food sources and between plants and pollinators. Because not all species adjust to climate change in the same way, the food that one species eats may no longer be available when that species needs it (for example, when migrating birds arrive). Some types of animals may no longer be able to find enough food".

=== Great Lakes ===
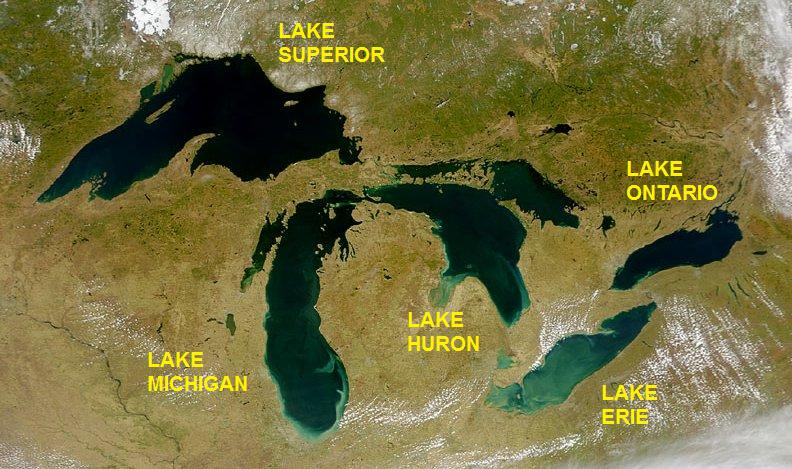
The 5 Great Lakes

"Changing the climate is also likely to harm water quality in Lake Michigan. Warmer water tends to cause more algal blooms, which can be unsightly, harm fish, and degrade water quality. Severe storms also increase the amount of pollutants that run off from land to water, so the risk of algal blooms will be greater if storms become more severe. Increasingly severe rainstorms could also cause sewers to overflow into the lake more often, threatening beach safety and drinking water supplies. One advantage of climate change is that warmer winters reduce the number of days that ice prevents navigation. Between 1994 and 2011, the decline in ice cover lengthened the shipping season on the Great Lakes by eight days. The lakes are likely to warm another 3° to 7°F in the next 70 years, which will further extend the shipping season".

The Great Lakes are also damaging shorelines as they fluctuate between higher tides and lower tides.

== Economic and social impacts ==
=== Winter recreation ===
The impacts of climate change vary by season. Greater warming is occurring during the season of winter in Wisconsin.

Warmer winters are anticipated to limit the season for leisure activities such as ice fishing, snowmobiling, skiing, and snowboarding, putting a strain on local businesses. Many local restaurants, hotels, and bars depend on the tourism that winter recreation brings. Small lakes are freezing and thawing later than they were a century ago, shortening the ice fishing and ice skating season. Winter ice covering in the Great Lakes has declined by 63 percent since the early 1970s. The warmer environment will likely limit the season when the ground is covered with snow, and hence the season for snow-related activities. Nonetheless, yearly snowfall in much of the Great Lakes area has increased, which may help winter activities at specific times and locations.

=== Agriculture ===
The multibillion-dollar dairy business in Wisconsin, which provides more than half of the state's agriculture revenue, may suffer as a result of the changing environment. Cows consume less and make less milk when the temperature rises. Crops may face obstacles as a result of climate change, but it may also help them in certain ways; the overall effect is unknown. Longer frost-free growing seasons and increased CO_{2} concentrations in the atmosphere would boost soybean and wheat harvests in an average year. Summers that are becoming increasingly hot are expected to lower maize yields. Much of Wisconsin will likely experience 5 to 10 more days per year with temperatures exceeding 95 °F in 70 years than it does now. Crop output would also be harmed by more severe droughts or floods.

Much like Wisconsin's tourism industry, agriculture also relies on predictable seasonal changes. Because of climate change, Wisconsin's seasonal cycles are becoming more and more unpredictable. The livelihoods of Wisconsin farmers are affected by the unpredictable weather changes every day. In addition to the livelihoods of farmers being affected by climate change in Wisconsin, the increased temperatures and precipitation threaten food security. Although a longer growing season sounds beneficial to food security, in reality, the warmer temperatures and increased precipitation are stressful to crops and animals.

Planting and harvesting crops will prove to be much more challenging due to the increase in precipitation. Soil erosion will increase and lead to larger amounts of polluted runoff. Polluted runoff could then in turn affect the water quality much like flooding and harm living beings.

The warmer temperatures and increases rainfall in the summer months are not the only factor contributing to climate change's effect on agriculture. The winter months in Wisconsin are also becoming warmer. The rise in temperature throughout those winter months allows microorganisms in the soil more time to break down the nutrient-rich organic matter that is found in the soil.

=== Air pollution and human health ===
"Changing the climate can harm air quality and amplify existing threats to human health. Higher temperatures increase the formation of ground-level ozone, a pollutant that causes lung and heart problems. Ozone also harms plants. In some rural parts of Wisconsin, ozone levels are high enough to reduce yields of soybeans and winter wheat. EPA and the Wisconsin Department of Natural Resources have been working to reduce ozone concentrations. As the climate changes, continued progress toward clean air will become more difficult".

"Climate change may also increase the length and severity of the pollen season for allergy sufferers. For example, the ragweed season in Madison and La Crosse is two weeks longer than in 1995, because the first frost in fall is later. The risk of some diseases carried by insects may also increase. The ticks that transmit Lyme disease are active when temperatures are above 45°F, so warmer winters could lengthen the season during which ticks can become infected or people can be exposed to the ticks".

The rise in temperature cause unequal impacts on low income families and communities of color. Many people who live in Milwaukee cannot afford or do not have access to air conditioning. "Northern cities like Milwaukee are vulnerable to heat waves, because many houses and apartments lack air conditioning, and urban areas are typically warmer than their rural surroundings". Surfaces that retain heat are more likely to be found in cities. Surfaces like asphalt and concrete can create a rise in temperature. "For example, heat waves killed 91 people in Milwaukee County in 1995, and 11 people in 1999. Heat stress is likely to increase as climate change brings hotter summer temperatures and more humidity. Certain people are especially vulnerable, including children, the elderly, the sick, and the poor".

The impacts of more frequent extreme events disproportionately impact vulnerable groups of people. As climate change continues to rise temperatures and the impacts of climate change grow, those who cannot afford to either more or adapt to the changing climate will be most at risk.

== Responses ==
In October 2019, Governor Tony Evers created the "Governor's Task Force on Climate Change", which is tasked with issuing recommendations to the governor by August 2020.

== See also ==
- Plug-in electric vehicles in Wisconsin
