= Area codes 920 and 274 =

Area codes in eastern Wisconsin

Coordinates: 44°15′N 88°00′W

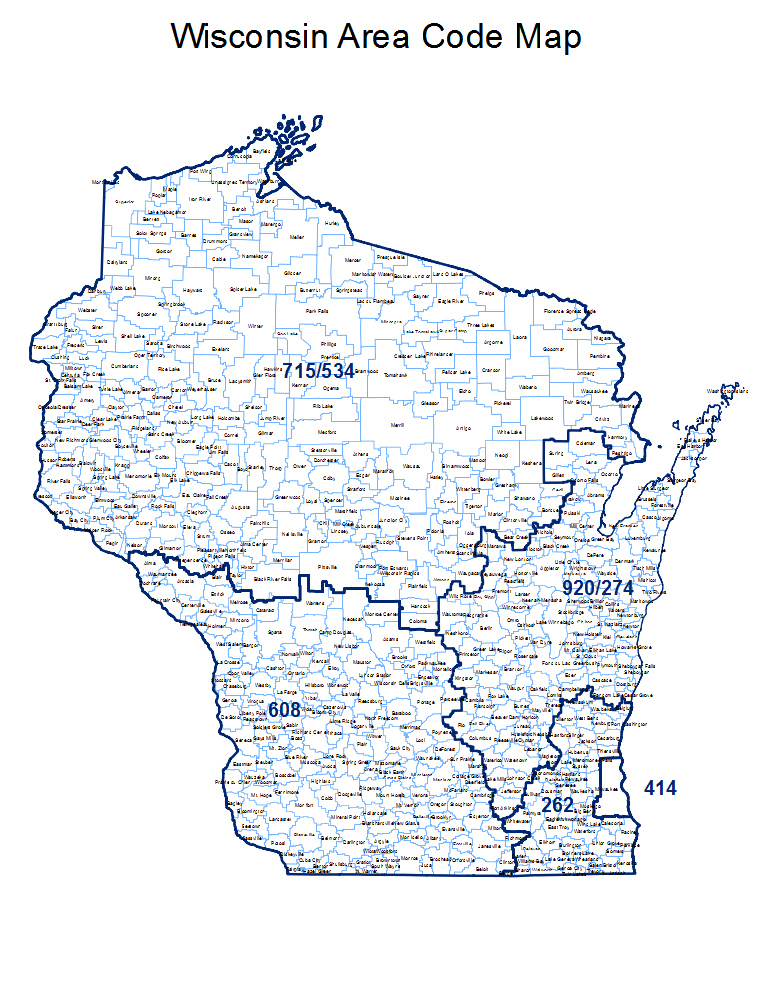
Wisconsin area codes.

Area codes 920 and 274 are telephone area codes in the North American Numbering Plan (NANP) for a large area of eastern Wisconsin. Area code 920 was created on July 26, 1997, in a split of area code 414, one of the original North American area codes of 1947. 274 was added to the same numbering plan area (NPA) on May 5, 2023 to create an area code overlay.

The 920/274 area code covers most of Northeast Wisconsin including Green Bay and the Fox Cities as well as the far northern and eastern exurban areas of the Madison MSA and far northern and western portions of the Milwaukee CSA

== History ==
When the American Telephone and Telegraph Company (AT&T) divided the North American continent into the original eighty-six numbering plan areas (NPAs) for the first nationwide telephone numbering plan in 1947, Wisconsin received two area codes, 414 for the south and northeast, and 715, for the northern part.

On November 22, 1996, Ameritech notified Bellcore, the North American Numbering Plan Administration (NANPA), that demand for telephone numbers had rapidly increased in the eastern part of the state, so that a jeopardy condition existed in which mitigation could not be provided early enough to avoid exhaustion of the numbering pool.

On January 15, 1997, the NANP announced a split of the numbering plan area to create the new area code 920, in which Milwaukee and the surrounding communities south of the city would retain the existing area code, and the northern portion of the numbering plan area would receive 920. The split became effective on July 26, 1997, and a permissive dialing period ended on October 25, 1997.

In 2008, service providers recognized the need for a second area code for northeastern Wisconsin, leading the Public Service Commission of Wisconsin to approve an overlay plan with new area code 274. The effective date for the new area code was announced as March 10, 2012. However, on December 22, 2010, PSC ordered a postponement of the plan due to new exhaustion forecasts for 2014. The Great Recession, number porting, a decline in landlines, and other factors delayed that requirement for fifteen years during which implementation was deferred several times.

Prior to October 2021, area code 920 had telephone numbers assigned for the central office code 988. In 2020, 988 was designated nationwide as a dialing code for the National Suicide Prevention Lifeline, which created a conflict because area code 920 permitted seven-digit dialing. 920 transitioned to ten-digit dialing on October 24, 2021. On December 8, 2008, the Public Service Commission finally approved an all-services distributed overlay as the relief method for NPA 920 and on March 16, 2022, the NANPA established the timeline for installation, setting the in-service date of area code 274 to March 22, 2024. Only months later, based on new exhaustion studies, this timeline was revised to May 5, 2023. The 274 area code has been established as an overlay for 920 as of May 5, 2023 but over 100 prefixes are permissible in Green Bay, WI e.g. 274-200-XXXX or 274-300-XXXX or 274-755-5555 but only 1 or 2 have been established in the vicinity of Sheboygan, WI and Winnebago, WI e.g. 274-766-XXXX.

== Service area ==
The area code serves the following counties:

Brown, Calumet, Columbia, Dane, Dodge, Door, Fond du Lac, Green Lake, Jefferson, Kewaunee, Manitowoc, Marinette, Marquette, Oconto, Outagamie, Shawano, Sheboygan, Waushara, and Winnebago

This includes the following towns and cities:

Abrams, Adell, Algoma, Appleton, Ashippun, Baileys Harbor, Beaver Dam, Berlin, Black Creek, Brandon, Brillion, Brownsville, Brussels, Burnett, Butte des Morts, Cambria, Campbellsport, Cascade, Casco, Cedar Grove, Chilton, Cleveland, Clyman, Coleman, Collins, Columbus, Combined Locks, Dale, Dalton, Darboy, De Pere, Deerfield, Denmark, Doylestown, Eden, Egg Harbor, Eldorado, Elkhart Lake, Ellison Bay, Ephraim, Erin, Eureka, Fairwater, Fall River, Fish Creek, Fond du Lac, Forest Junction, Forestville, Fort Atkinson, Fox Lake, Francis Creek, Freedom, Fremont, Friesland, Gillett, Glenbeulah, Green Bay, Green Lake, Greenbush, Greenleaf, Greenville, Hilbert, Hingham, Horicon, Hortonville, Hustisford, Iron Ridge, Ixonia, Jefferson, Johnson Creek, Juneau, Kaukauna, Kellnersville, Kewaunee, Kiel, Kimberly, Kingston, Kohler, Krakow, Lake Mills, Larsen, Lebanon, Lena, Little Chute, Little Suamico, Lomira, Lowell, Luxemburg, Malone, Manawa, Manitowoc, Maplewood, Maribel, Markesan, Marquette, Mayville, Medina, Menasha, Mishicot, Mount Calvary, Neenah, Neosho, Neshkoro, New Franken, New Holstein, New London, Newton, Nichols, Oakfield, Oconto, Oconto Falls, Ogdensburg, Omro, Oneida, Oostburg, Oshkosh, Pickett, Pine River, Plymouth, Potter, Pound, Poy Sippi, Princeton, Pulaski, Randolph, Random Lake, Readfield, Redgranite, Reedsville, Reeseville, Rio, Ripon, Rosendale, Rubicon, St. Cloud, St. Nazianz, Saxeville, Seymour, Sheboygan, Sheboygan Falls, Sherwood, Shiocton, Sister Bay, Sobieski, Stockbridge, Sturgeon Bay, Suamico, Suring, Theresa, Tisch Mills, Two Rivers, Valders, Van Dyne, Waldo, Washington Island, Waterloo, Watertown, Waukau, Waupun, Wautoma, Weyauwega, Whitelaw, Wild Rose, Winnebago, Winneconne, Woodland, and Wrightstown, York

== Popular culture ==
Area code 920 was commonly remembered by using the mnemonic device of the late Green Bay Packer Reggie White's jersey number, 92, adding a zero.

== See also ==
- List of Wisconsin area codes
- List of North American Numbering Plan area codes

Wisconsin area codes: 262, 414, 608/353, 715/534, 920/274
	North: 534/715, 906	
West: 608/353	920/274	East: Lake Michigan, 231
	South: 262	
Michigan area codes: 231, 248/947, 269, 313/679, 517, 586, 616, 734, 810, 906, 989
