= Wisconsin Cream City Chorus =

US choir

- Choir
- Also known as: WCCC
- Origin: Milwaukee, Wisconsin, United States
- Founded: April 1, 1987
- Disbanded: April 1, 2012
- Genre: List: Broadway; choral; classical; jazz; popular
- Artistic Director: Kristen L. Weber
- Leadership: Chuck Ellingson (associate director)
- Chief conductor: Kristen L. Weber

The Wisconsin Cream City Chorus was an LGBTQ chorus in Milwaukee, Wisconsin, active from 1987 to 2012. Although originally formed as a chorus of gays, lesbians and their friends, the chorus was open to singers of any identity.

== History ==
The chorus was founded on April 1, 1987. It was named after a nickname of Milwaukee which refers to a brick manufacturing company that produced a light colored brick. While the group's official name was Wisconsin Cream City Chorus, it was common to refer to the group as Cream City Chorus or Milwaukee Cream City Chorus.

In 1993, 1994, and 1995 the Chorus performed as backup chorus for Barry Manilow's Greatest Hits tour when he performed in Milwaukee.

The chorus ended operations on April 1, 2012, with a concert given on that day, 25 years exactly since its founding. The group recorded a CD called Our Legacy which was available for purchase at that time.

== Performances ==
The WCCC produced two to four concerts annually. In addition to concerts, the chorus also performed at the Holiday Invitational Tournament and for memorial services, weddings, and commitment ceremonies.

The Chorus's signature song was "I Love Myself Just the Way I Am", A Song of Affirmation by Jai Josefs. It was dedicated to the chorus in 1987 and was performed as the last song at every concert performance.

== Affiliated groups ==
The Creamettes was an ensemble of the chorus.
