= List of Wisconsin area codes =

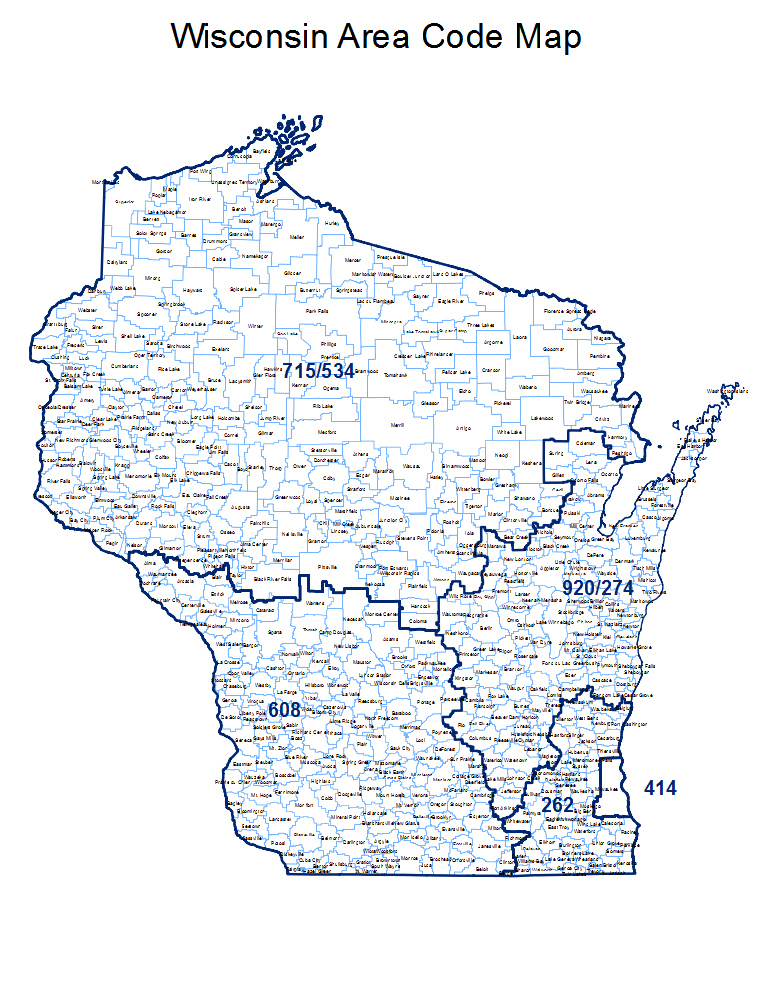
Area code map for Wisconsin

The U.S. state of Wisconsin is serviced in five geographically distinct numbering plan areas (NPAs) in the North American Numbering Plan (NANP) with the following area codes. Area codes 414 and 715 were among the original North American area codes assigned in 1947.

| Area code | Year | Parent NPA | Overlay | Numbering plan area |
|---|---|---|---|---|
| 414 | 1947 | – | – | Milwaukee County and several outlying areas served by Milwaukee County exchanges. |
| 608 | 1955 | 414 | 353/608 | southwestern Wisconsin, including Madison. |
| 353 | 2023 | 608 | 353/608 | southwestern Wisconsin, including Madison. |
| 920 | 1997 | 414 | 274/920 | eastern Wisconsin including Green Bay, the Fox Cities, Manitowoc and Sheboygan. |
| 274 | 2023 | 920 | 274/920 | eastern Wisconsin including Green Bay, the Fox Cities, Manitowoc and Sheboygan. |
| 262 | 1999 | 414 | – | Southeastern part of the state including Waukesha, Racine and Kenosha, except for Milwaukee County and several outlying areas served by Milwaukee County exchanges |
| 715 | 1947 | – | 534/715 | northern Wisconsin, including Superior, Eau Claire and Wausau |
| 534 | 2010 | 715 | 534/715 | northern Wisconsin, including Superior, Eau Claire and Wausau |
