= New North Road =

New North Road may refer to:

- New North Road, Islington, a road in London
- New North Road, New Zealand, a road in Auckland
