= Wisconsin Bio Industry Alliance =

The Wisconsin Bio Industry Alliance (WBIA) is a non-profit membership organization intended to promote biofuels, biopower, and bioproducts in Wisconsin. The group was formed in January 2007 as an outgrowth of a number of different organizations, including the Wisconsin Ethanol Producers Association and the Governor's Bio-based Industry Consortium. Current members include all of the state's five ethanol producers and the state's first large-scale biodiesel producer. The alliances recognizes those organizations who contribute to the state's bio industry, and the organization's founder, Joshua Morby regularly speaks on topics including the benefits of ethanol production.

The WBIA is managed by JRM Advisers a Milwaukee, Wisconsin based consulting firm.
