= Wisconsin Ovarian Cancer Alliance =

American nonprofit organization

The Wisconsin Ovarian Cancer Alliance (WOCA) was founded in May 2001 to bring attention to ovarian cancer, as well as provide education, encourage advocacy and garner support for research and an eventual cure. WOCA is a tax-exempt organization pursuant to Section 501(c)(3) of the Internal Revenue Code. The organization falls under the umbrella, and is a working partner of the Ovarian Cancer National Alliance. The Wisconsin Ovarian Cancer Alliance mission is to overcome ovarian cancer through the following:

Education - WOCA pledges to create awareness of early warning signs that may be indicative of ovarian cancer. This means educating individuals, the medical community and organizations to recognize the subtle symptoms of ovarian cancer. In so doing, WOCA hopes to increase early detection and improve treatment methods.

Support - WOCA works to support Wisconsinites and their families in their battle against ovarian cancer. This includes developing and distributing educational material, promoting support systems and creating networking groups.

Advocacy - WOCA's membership supports the advocacy efforts of the Ovarian Cancer National Alliance to secure additional funds and advance research toward a cure.

WOCA achieves its mission through grassroots campaigns, annual events and fundraisers, support groups, industry partnerships and educational activities.

== History ==
While working as a volunteer on the Komen Foundation's Milwaukee Race for the Cure in 1999, Joan Sagan, an oncology nurse with more than 20 years experience, was diagnosed with ovarian cancer. She wanted to start a Wisconsin organization that would provide education, encourage advocacy, and generate support for ovarian cancer research and awareness.

After her treatment, Sagan assembled family, friends, medical professionals and fellow survivors to launch the Wisconsin Ovarian Cancer Alliance (WOCA). Key actions have included the formation of a medical advisory board; identification of outreach partners in Green Bay and Madison, as well as Metropolitan Milwaukee; creation of the Comedy for the Cure fundraising event; and the launch of an informational web site.

== Governance and leadership ==
WOCA is run by a board of directors composed of officers, members and advisors from all over the Metropolitan Milwaukee area, and includes founders, supporters, survivors and medical professionals.

There is also an Ovarian Cancer Medical Advisory Board.

== Support groups ==
Ovarian Cancer Support Groups are available via WOCA in Metropolitan Milwaukee, Appleton, Madison and Waukesha.
