= Sister Islands (Wisconsin) =

Two islands in Lake Michigan, U.S.

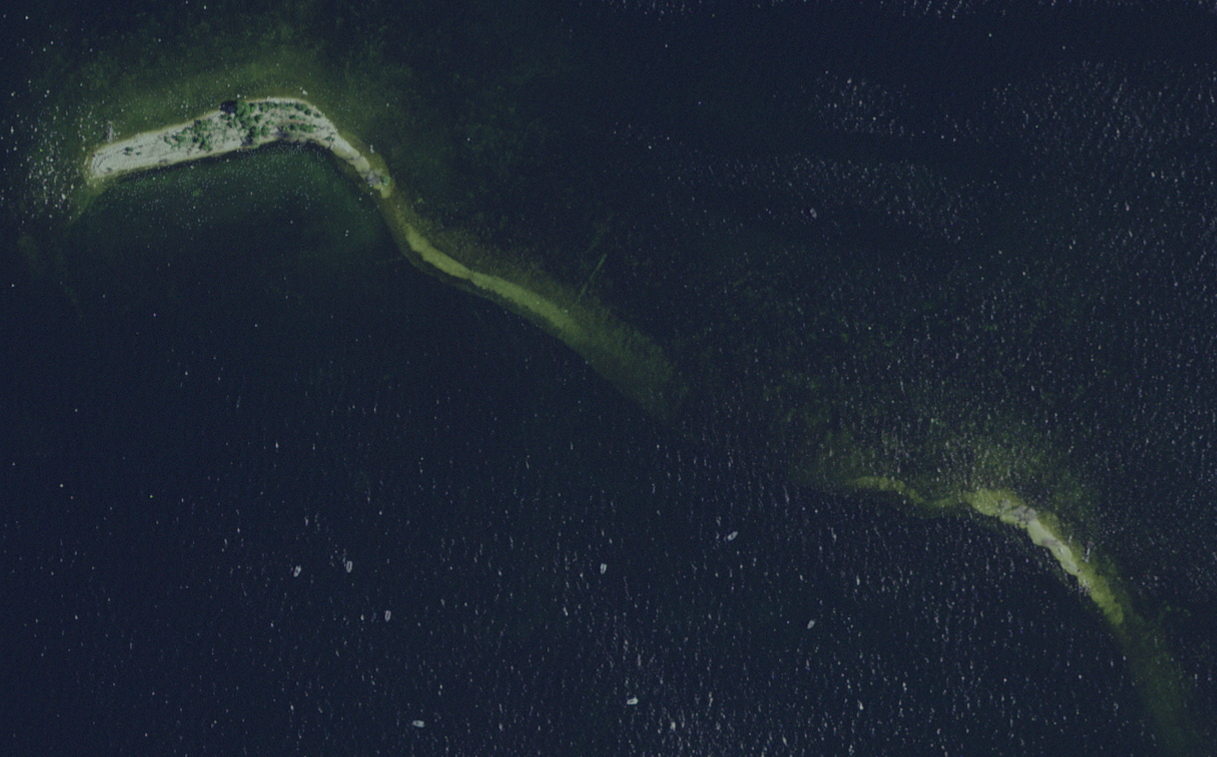
- In June 2020 when this picture was taken the average lake level was 177.45 meters above sea level; the relatively high lake levels reduced the size of the islands that year.

- Location within Wisconsin Location within the United States

Geography
- Location: Green Bay, Lake Michigan
- Coordinates: 45°13′28″N 87°08′46″W
- Area: 6 acres (2.4 ha)
- Highest elevation: 581 ft (177.1 m)

Administration
- United States
- State: Wisconsin
- County: Door County
- Town: Liberty Grove

The Sister Islands are two islands in Lake Michigan. They are located in the bay of Green Bay, in the town of Liberty Grove, Wisconsin. At one point the islands were connected, but higher water levels have eroded the size of the islands. Combined, the area of the islands sits at 6 acres (2.4 ha).

There are many species of birds that nest on the islands. In 1964 there were an estimated 1,350 to 1,650 breeding pairs of herring gulls on the islands. Both islands are owned and operated by the Wisconsin Department of Natural Resources, and they are protected as the Sister Islands State Natural Area.

The shipwreck Meridian lies in the water south of the islands.

== Climate ==
Sister Islands

Climate chart (precipitation, max. and min. temperature)
J	F	M	A	M	J	J	A	S	O	N	D
63 −5 −10	52 −9 −14	49 1 −6	97 6 0	86 11 3	91 15 9	105 20 16	96 20 14	96 17 14	107 9 6	80 8 2	57 3 −1
- █ Average max. and min. temperatures in °C
- █ Precipitation totals in mm
Imperial conversion
J	F	M	A	M	J	J	A	S	O	N	D
2.5 23 14	2 16 7	1.9 34 21	3.8 43 32	3.4 52 37	3.6 59 48	4.1 68 61	3.8 68 57	3.8 63 57	4.2 48 43	3.1 46 36	2.2 37 30
- █ Average max. and min. temperatures in °F
- █ Precipitation totals in inches

== Diagram ==
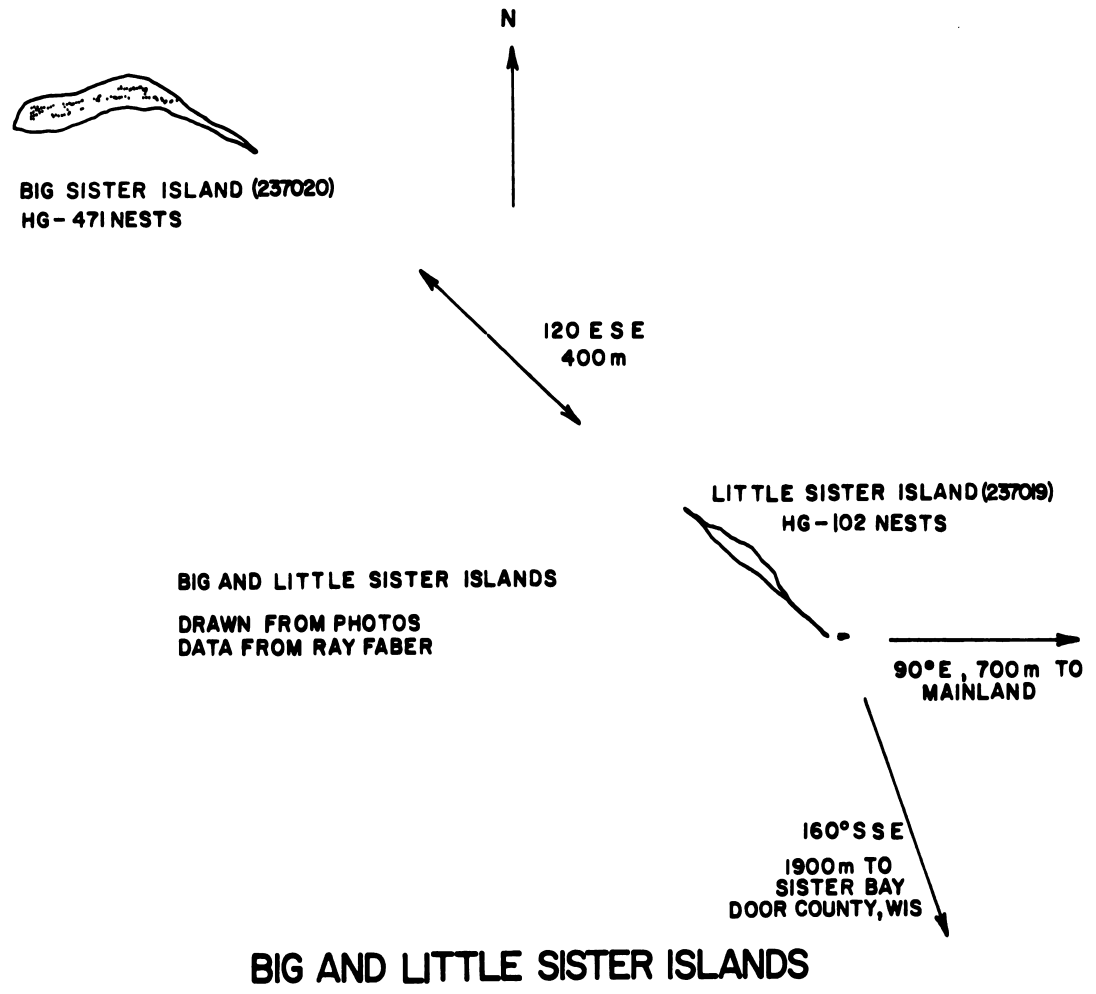
Big and Little Sister islands, as drawn from photos taken in 1976

== Gallery ==
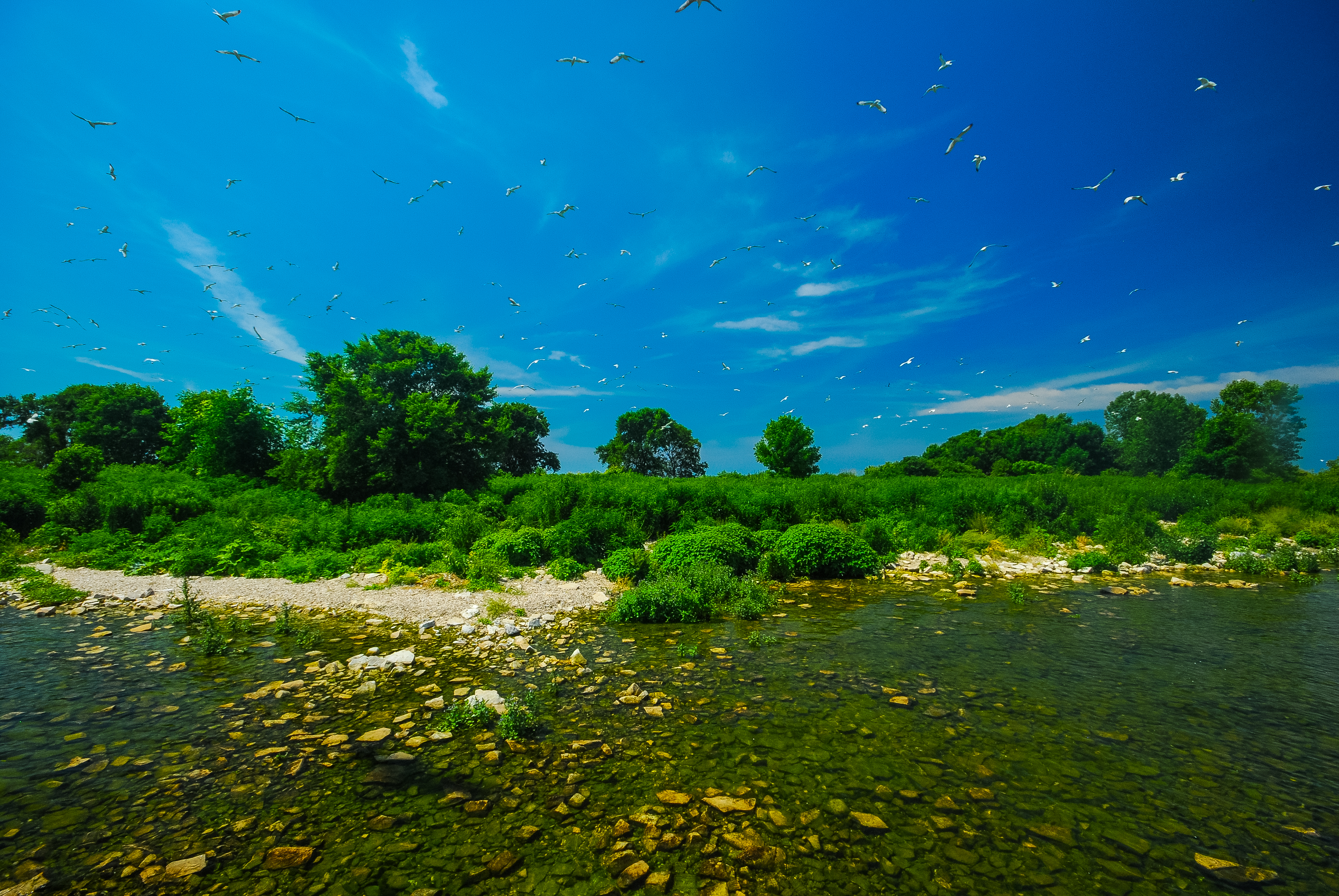
Big Sister Island

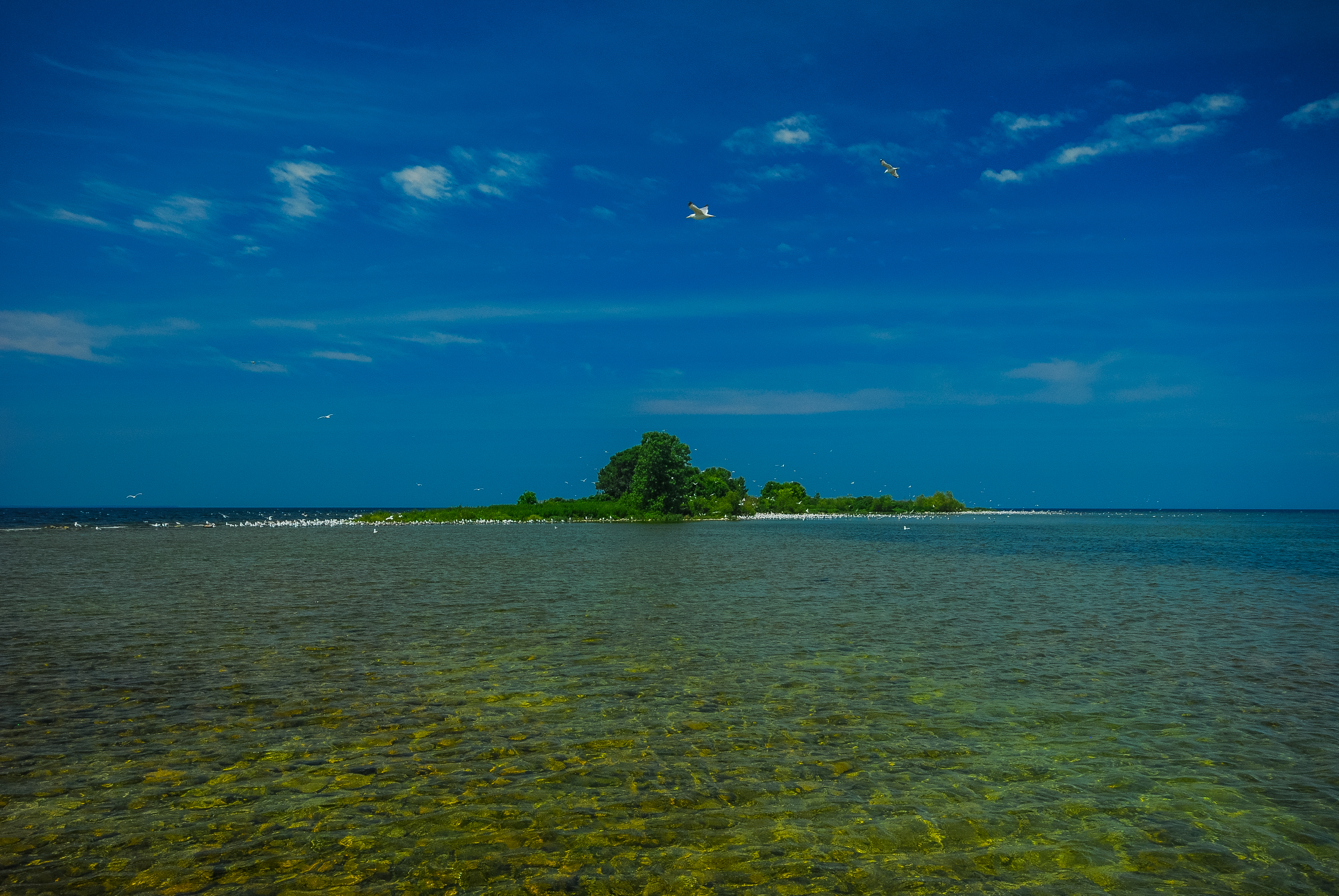
Little Sister Island

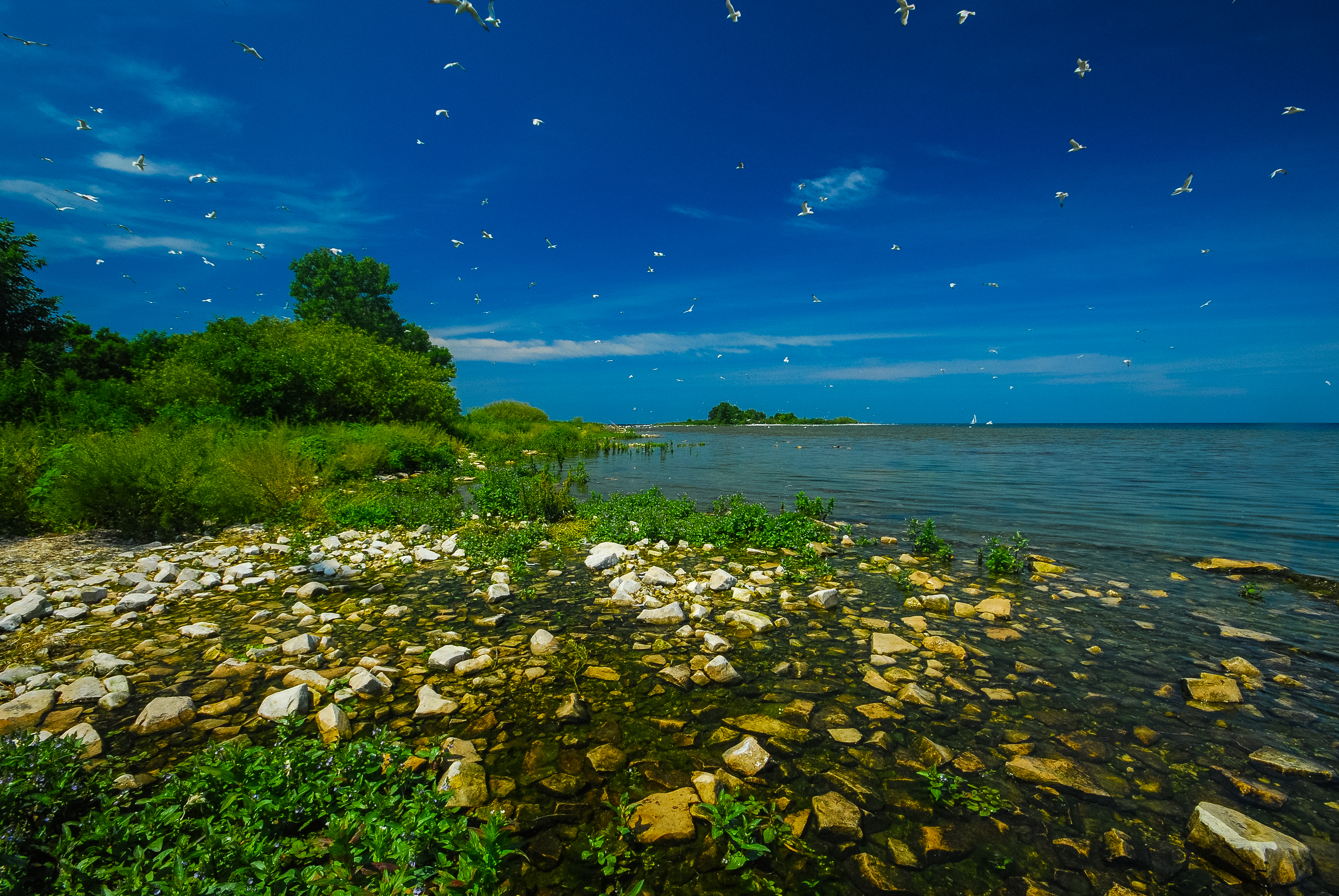
Big Sister Island (left, foreground) and Little Sister Island (right, background)

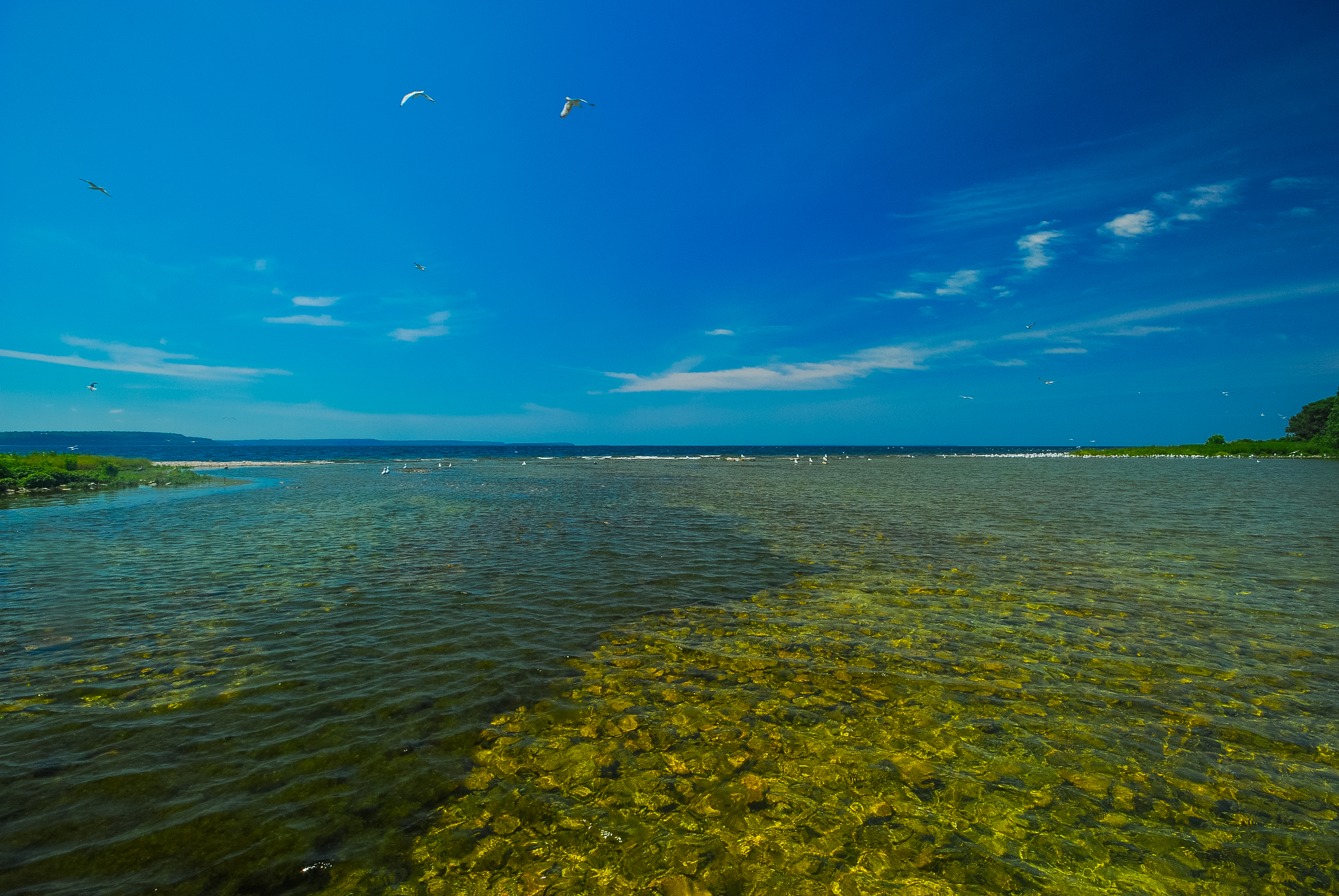
Shoal between the islands
