= Plug-in electric vehicles in Wisconsin =

As of 2021, there were about 9,000 electric vehicles registered in Wisconsin. This had increased to over 38,000 by the end of 2025.

EV registrations in Wisconsin from 2016 to 2025

== Government policy ==
As of 2022, the state government offers tax rebates of up to $1,000 for electric vehicle purchases.

As of 2021, the state government charges a $100 registration fee for electric vehicles, and $75 for plug-in hybrid vehicles. At this rate, EV drivers pay approximately $95 more in tax every year than similar fossil-fuel powered car drivers.

Politicians who have led the effort to implement these fees have been found to have received significant funding from the oil and gas industry. In addition, organizations funded by the oil and gas industry, such as ALEC, are actively pushing for fee increases.

== Charging stations ==
As of February 2022, there were 380 public charging stations in Wisconsin.

The Infrastructure Investment and Jobs Act, signed into law in November 2021, allocates US$79 million to charging stations in Wisconsin.

In June 2022, the state government released a plan to recognize I-90, I-94, I-43, I-41, I-535, US-53, and US-151 as alternative fuel corridors. Around half of all public charging stations in the state are within one mile of a corridor.

As of July 2026, Wisconsin had reached a total of 888 operational EV charging stations. Of those, 25 stations were NEVI-compliant. There were an additional nine NEVI-compliant charging stations under construction and 43 in the pre-construction stage.

== By region ==
=== Eau Claire ===
As of December 2019, less than 1% of vehicles registered in Eau Claire were electric. By 2025, the number of EVs had risen to 618.

=== La Crosse ===
As of 2025, there were 637 electric vehicles registered in La Crosse County.

=== Madison ===
As of 2021, there were 2,227 electric vehicles registered in Dane County. This increased to 8,622 at the end of 2025 making Dane County the county with the most EVs.

As of 2026, a third of Madison Metro Transit's fleet is made up of battery electric buses.

=== Milwaukee ===
As of 2021, there were 1,320 electric vehicles registered in Milwaukee County. By the end of 2025, there were 5,463 electric vehicles.

=== Waukesha ===
Waukesha County had the third most EVs of any county in Wisconsin at the end of 2025, with 4,711.
