= Housing in Wisconsin =

Overview of housing in the U.S. state of Wisconsin

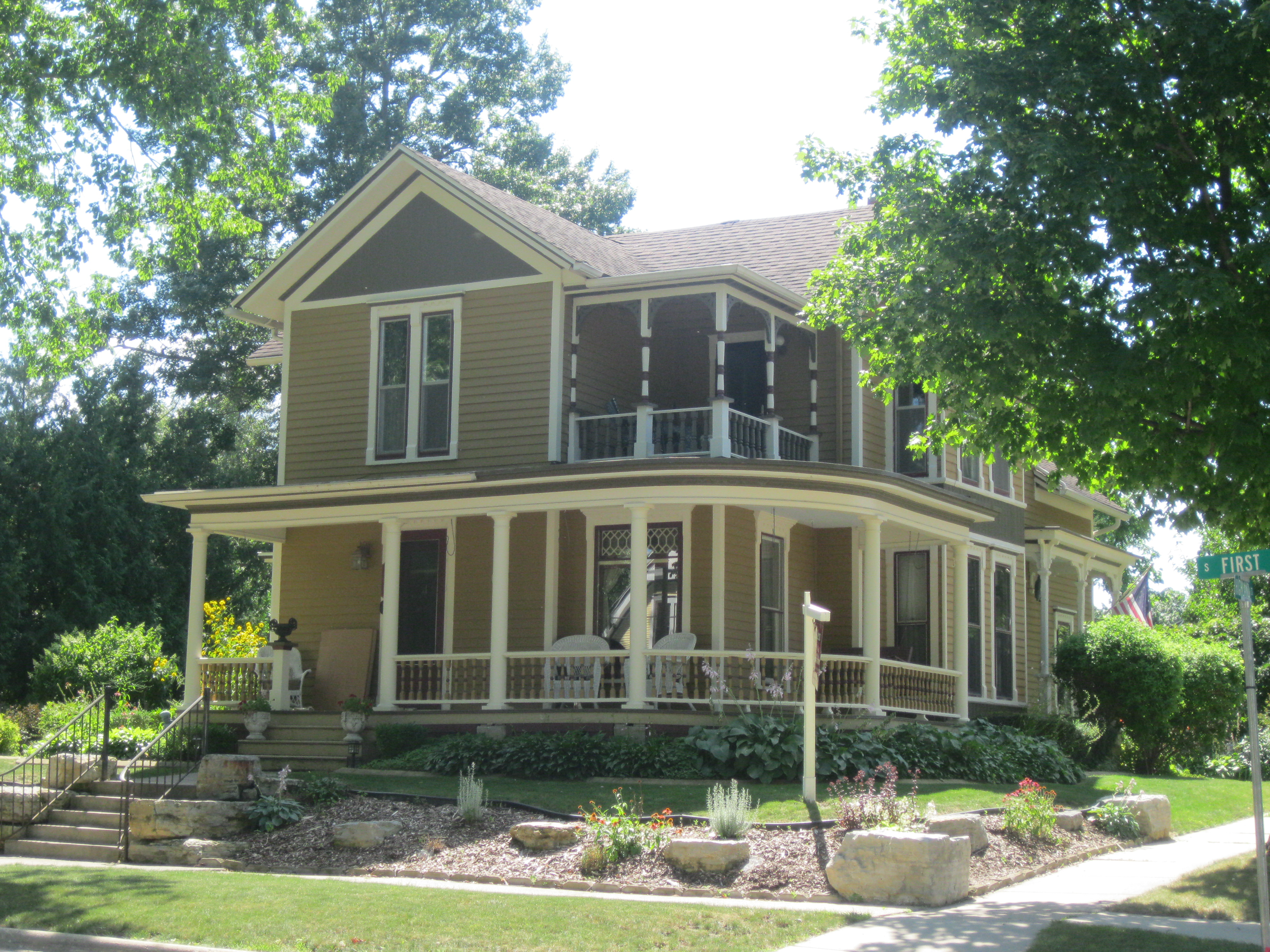
A house in Evansville, Wisconsin.

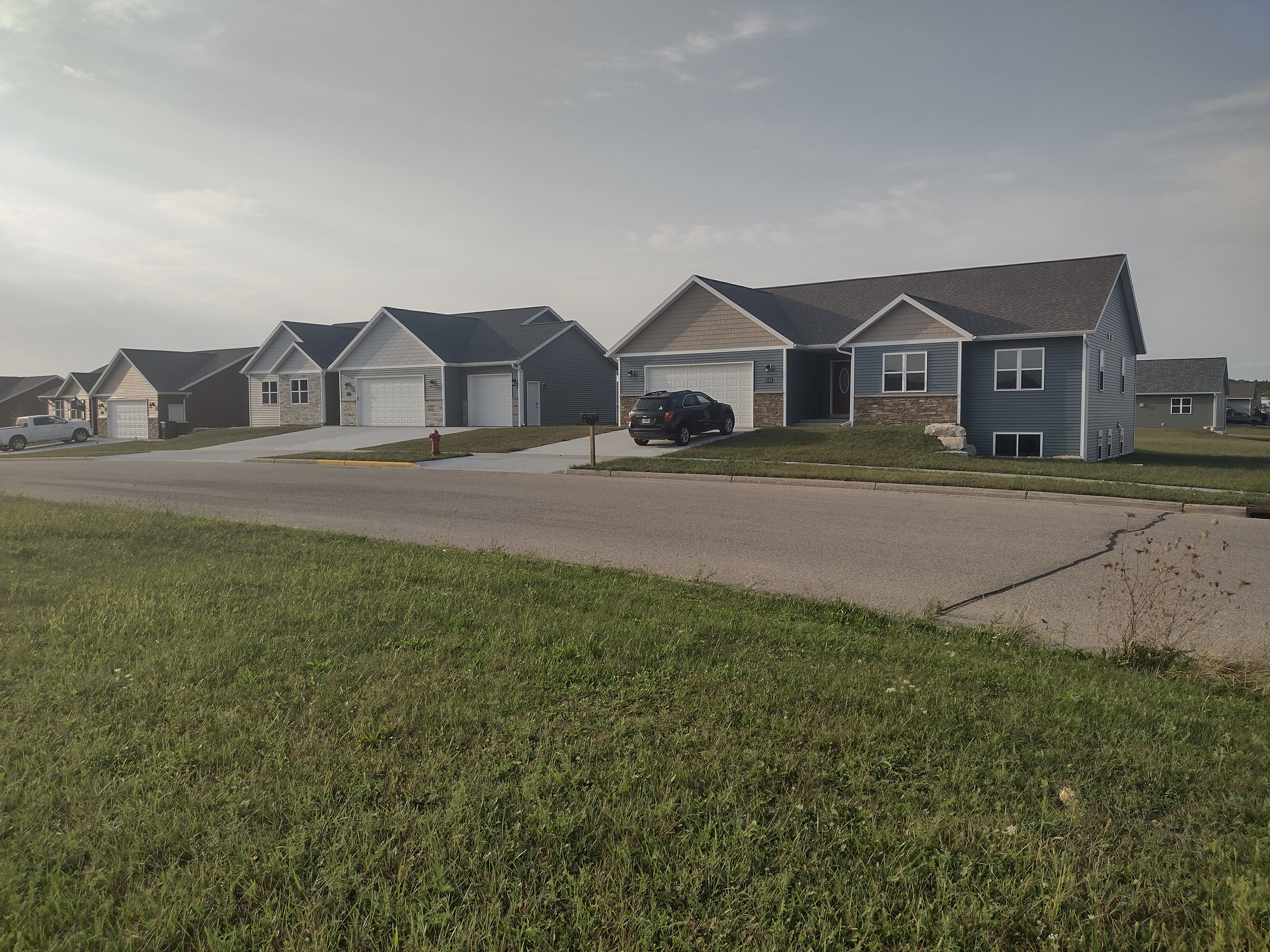
Example of Wisconsin houses built between 2015 and 2025

Housing in Wisconsin is mainly based on detached homes. Additional kinds of housing include multiple-unit buildings, typically owned by a corporation or individual. Several home styles have been popular, including ranch and split-level houses.

== History ==
During the 1800s, people started to settle in Wisconsin, bringing their home styles with them. Important styles in Wisconsin during this time include colonial and Greek revival. During the 1900s, important cities such as Madison and Milwaukee started to grow rapidly. During this time, several public housing developments were built. As of January 2019, there were 4,538 homeless individuals living in Wisconsin.

== Utilities ==
Central heating is most commonly found in Wisconsin homes. Homes typically include a gas furnace, and in older homes, a wood furnace. In most modern homes, HVAC is installed, with separate heating and cooling units. In older homes, usually only a furnace is installed, with a window unit air conditioner instead of a standard air conditioning unit. All residences are required to have insulation installed.

Gas-powered dryers and stoves are typically found in older homes, with more modern homes using electrically powered equivalents.

== See also ==
- Housing Authority of the City of Milwaukee
