= Wisconsin WIC Association =

- Type: Professional organization
- Purpose: To support the WIC program in Wisconsin
- Website: wiwica.org

The Wisconsin WIC Association, founded in 1998, is an American professional association with a mission to support and promote Wisconsin's WIC program (Special Supplemental Nutrition Program for Women, Infants and Children) as well as assist the National WIC Association in ensuring continual program existence.

== History ==
In 1973, Wisconsin became a pilot state for the WIC Program. By 1974, with a budget of $350,000 and total participation of 1,300: WIC operated in Green Bay Area Free clinic, Menominee Tribe, and Great Lakes Intertribal Council. By 1980, WIC had expanded to over 55 projects, including the State's two major urban locations Milwaukee and Madison. By 1990, the majority of the current WIC Program was in place. Divided into 5 regions and WIC services were being provided in nearly every county of Wisconsin. As WIC expanded, it became increasingly more difficult to maintain contact and communication with the numerous WIC projects throughout the state. Recognizing that, on June 30, 1998, a group of like-minded individuals met together resulting in the formation of Wisconsin WIC Association (WWA).

== Function ==
The WWA organizes meetings and projects by WIC employees, politicians, and community members to encourage funding, grant dispersal, and educational programs related to the WIC.
