= List of television shows set in Wisconsin =

The following television shows are set in the U.S. state of Wisconsin:

- Adventure in Dairyland (set in Madison)
- Agents of S.H.I.E.L.D. (set in Milwaukee and several fictional cities)
- Aliens in America (set in Chippewa Falls)
- American Dreamer (set in Kenosha)
- Dahmer – Monster: The Jeffrey Dahmer Story (partly set in Milwaukee area)
- The George Wendt Show (set in Madison)
- Happy Days (set in suburban Milwaukee)
- Laverne & Shirley (set in Milwaukee)
- Liv & Maddie (set in Stevens Point)
- Raising Miranda (set in Racine)
- Step by Step (set in Port Washington)
- Supernatural (multiple episodes set in various Wisconsin towns including episodes based in Milwaukee and Madison)
- A Whole New Ballgame (set in Milwaukee)

== Television shows set in fictional cities in Wisconsin ==
- ChalkZone (set in fictional city of Plainville, which is possibly located in Wisconsin, as there is a very small town named Plainville located within the Wisconsin Township of Dell Prairie. However, this appears to be a mere theory, as at no point in the show is its fictional setting of Plainville ever stated to be located in the state of Wisconsin.)
- Life with Louie (set in fictional Cedar Knoll)
- A Minute With Stan Hooper (set in fictional Waterford Falls)
- My Talk Show (set in fictional Derbyville)
- Picket Fences (set in a fictional town of Rome, although there are two towns of Rome in Wisconsin, one in Adams County and the other in Jefferson County)
- School Spirits (set in fictional Split River)
- That '70s Show (set in the fictional Point Place, a suburb of Kenosha)
- The Young and the Restless (set in a fictional Genoa City, although there is a real town of Genoa City; It also make references to Waukesha County in several storylines)
