= Wisconsin Institute of Certified Public Accountants =

The Wisconsin Institute of Certified Public Accountants (WICPA) is a professional association representing the certified public accountant (CPA) profession in Wisconsin. Founded in 1905, WICPA has more than 8,000 members and serves as the professional organization of CPAs, CPA candidates and accounting students. WICPA members work in public accounting, business and industry, not-for-profit, government and education.

WICPA aims to promote the CPA designation by encouraging students and CPA candidates to take the Uniform Certified Public Accountant Examination and to provide support and services for CPAs from their entry into the workforce through retirement.
