= Wisconsin Career Academy =

Wisconsin Career Academy, later known as the Wisconsin College Preparatory Academy, was a middle school and high school in Milwaukee, Wisconsin. Founded in 2000, it originally operated as a charter school under the Milwaukee Public Schools system. In June 2012, the MPS Board of School Directors and WCA administration mutually agreed to terminate the charter school contract. Prior to this termination, in February 2012, the school board of directors had decided to change its name to Wisconsin College Preparatory Academy and announced that it would operate as a private high school under the Milwaukee Parental Choice Program for the 2012-2013 year.
