= The New North =

The New North, Inc. is a consortium of business, economic development, chambers of commerce, workforce development, civic, non-profit, and education leaders in the 18-county region of Northeast Wisconsin known as "The New North."

The New North includes the counties of Florence, Marinette, Oconto, Menominee, Shawano, Door, Kewaunee, Outagamie, Brown, Waupaca, Waushara, Winnebago, Calumet, Manitowoc, Sheboygan, Fond du Lac, Green Lake, and Marquette.

The organization was created in late 2005 in order to facilitate regional cooperation and economic development, while encouraging educational attainment and diversity and supporting an entrepreneurial climate. Wisconsin Governor Jim Doyle cited The New North as one of the beneficiaries of the Midwestern Governors Association (MGA) Energy Security and Climate Change Agreement that he signed in November 2007. The group launched an effort to get wind energy businesses to come the area.

The New North, Inc. hosts an annual summit to discuss the progress of the organization, as well as opportunities to grow the region's economy.
