= Wisconsin Virtual Learning =

School

Coordinates: 43°28′35.5″N 87°56′34.7″W

Wisconsin Virtual Learning (known as WVL) is a charter school of the Northern Ozaukee School District (Best known as NOSD).
