= Axley Brynelson, LLP =

- Headquarters: Madison, Wisconsin
- No. of offices: 2
- No. of attorneys: 54
- No. of employees: 104
- Key people: Patricia Gibeault, Managing Partner
- Date founded: 1885
- Founder: Burr W. Jones; E. Ray Stevens; E.J.B. Schubring; William Ryan; Arnold Petersen
- Company type: Limited liability partnership
- Website: www.axley.com

Axley Brynelson, LLP is a full-service law firm founded in 1885 with two Wisconsin offices in Madison and Waukesha. As one of Madison's oldest and most experienced law firms, Axley Brynelson represents individuals, small businesses, government entities and privately and publicly held companies. The Wisconsin Law Journal named Axley Brynelson one of the 10 largest Wisconsin law firms in its Largest Law Firms of 2009 Survey, and the firm's attorneys are regularly recognized by national and local publications including Wisconsin Super Lawyers and Rising Stars Magazine, Martindale-Hubbell peer review ratings and the 2014 edition of Best Lawyers.

== History ==
Axley Brynelson traces its lineage back to the 1885 partnership of Burr W. Jones and Francis Lamb. The firm has had three of their attorneys serve as president of the Wisconsin Bar Association. As of January 2015, they had 168 cases before the Wisconsin Supreme Court. The firm took the name Axley Brynelson in 1988 with the merger of Brynelson, Herrick, Buchaida, Dorchel and Armstrong with Easton & Harms. At that time, the newly formed company was the largest tenant of the new Manchester Place office building at 2 East Mifflin in Madison occupying 2 floors (20,000 sqft).

== Offices ==
Axley Brynelson has two office locations in Wisconsin: Madison, Wisconsin and Waukesha, Wisconsin. Patricia Gibeault became the firms first female managing partner after John Mitby stepped down October 31, 2014.
