= Mmhi =

Mmhi or MMHI may stand for:

- Mendota Mental Health Institute, a Wisconsin hospital
- Michael & Michael Have Issues, a television series
