= Winnebago Mental Health Institute =

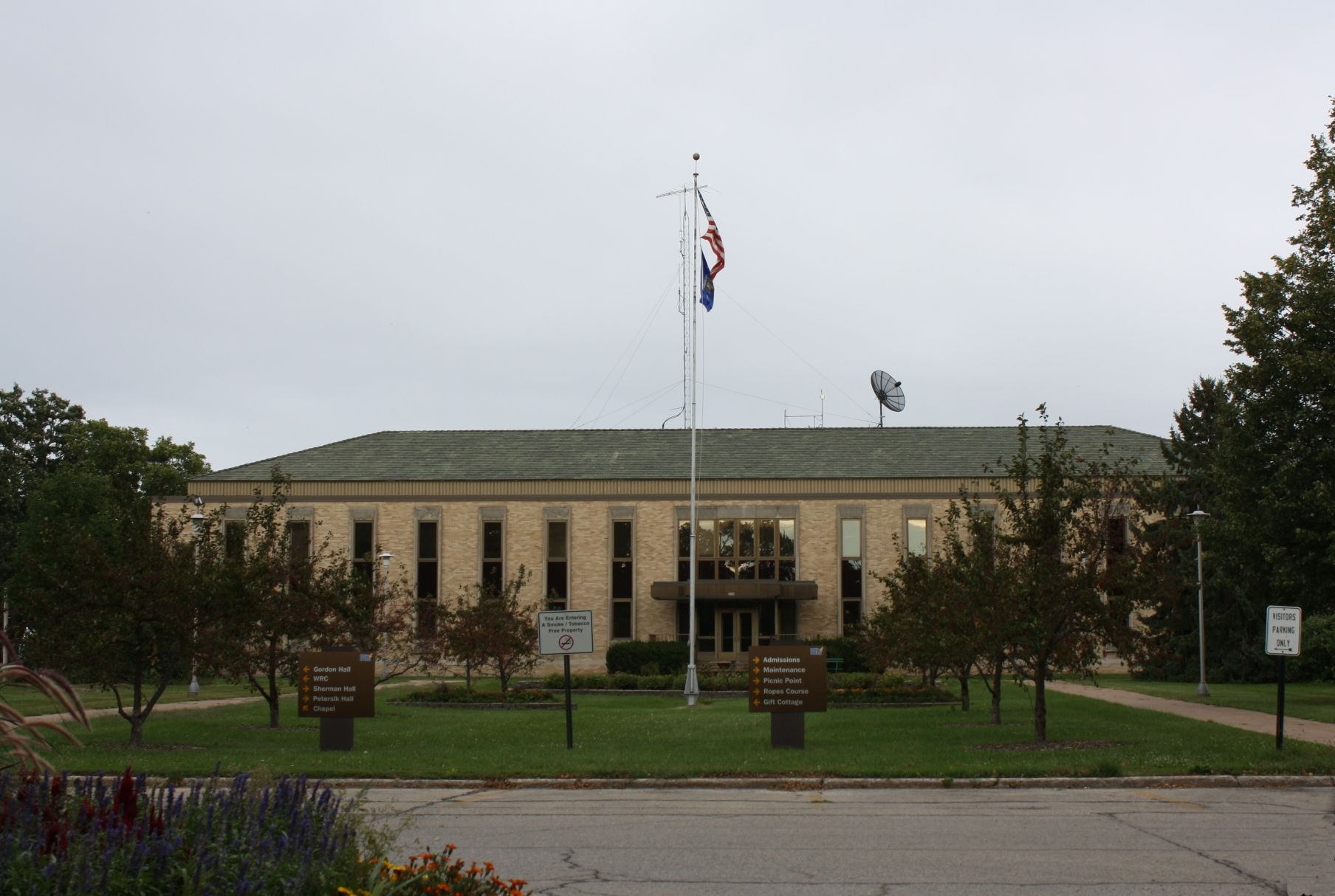
- One of WMHI's buildings pictured in 2010

- Shown in Wisconsin Winnebago Mental Health Institute (the United States)

Geography
- Location: Winnebago, Wisconsin, United States
- Coordinates: 44.075°N 88.518°W

Organisation
- Type: Specialist
- Patron: None

Services
- Emergency department: No
- Speciality: Psychiatric hospital

History
- Founded: 1873

Links
- Website: https://www.dhs.wisconsin.gov/winnebago/index.htm

Winnebago Mental Health Institute (WMHI), formerly the Winnebago State Hospital, is a psychiatric hospital near Oshkosh, Wisconsin, United States located in the unincorporated community of Winnebago, Wisconsin.

== History ==
The Winnebago State Hospital was one of several 19th-century psychiatric hospitals in the United States built on the Kirkbride Plan, a style of mental asylum design advocated by Philadelphia psychiatrist Thomas Story Kirkbride in the mid-19th century. The site of the hospital was the object of a competition between Green Bay and Oshkosh in 1870. The voters in the area approved an expenditure of $16,700 to begin construction.

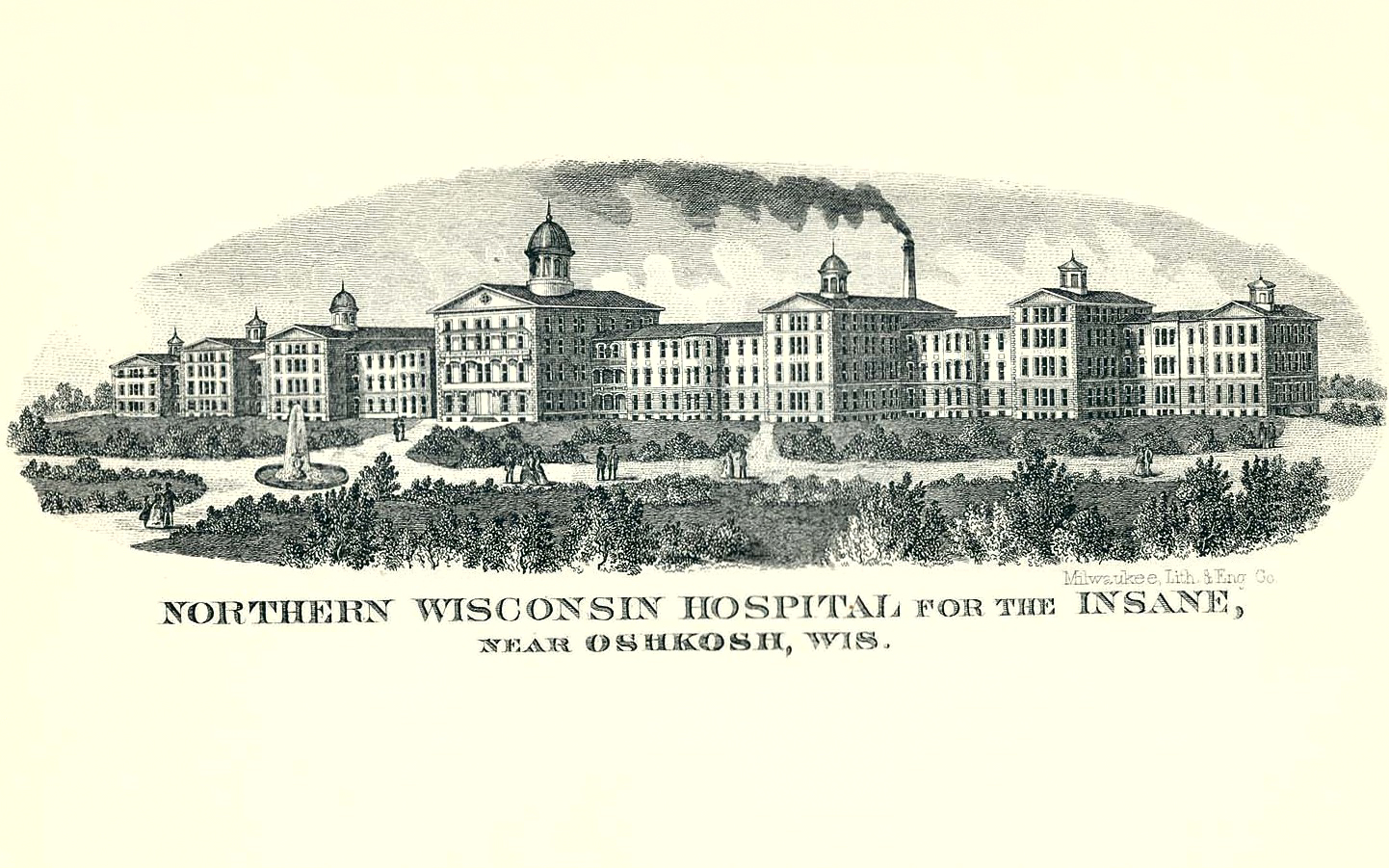
A drawing of the original structure from the 1885 Wisconsin Blue Book

Construction first began for the institute in 1871. It opened in 1873 as the Northern State Hospital for the Insane, with the first patient admitted on April 21, 1873. The original building (now gone) was completed on November 11, 1875, with a capacity of 500 beds. Capacity was said to be 650, by 1891. The name was later changed to Winnebago State Hospital c.1930s then to Winnebago Mental Health Institute c.1970s.

John Flammang Schrank, the attempted assassin of Theodore Roosevelt, was committed to the Northern Hospital for the Insane at Winnebago in November 1912. He later died at Central State Hospital for the Criminally Insane in Waupun, Wisconsin.

By 1932, the facility housed 864 patients with 164 staff members and an official capacity of 727.

Scandal erupted after a patient died at Winnebago in January 1934. The death of Oscar Schrader kicked off a Legislative inquiry that eventually spread to several state mental health facilities from February to July 1934. It resulted in around 30 dismissals of staff and officials from Mendota, Winnebago and Waupun. The asylum guard was acquitted by an Oshkosh jury on two manslaughter counts, but he was discharged for his actions and the Legislative committee sought to compensate the widow for his death.

Major construction occurred at the facility in the 1950s and 1960s and the original kirkbride plan structure was demolished incrementally during that time period. The main facility was centered just east of the intersection of Butler Avenue and Main street.

Average daily patient population

Year	Pat.
1880	529
1890	616
1900	566
1910	648
1920	611
1931	786
1940	755

Year	Pat.
1950	986
1960	987
1970	574
1980	310
1990	266
2000	279
2010	291

Source: Wisconsin Blue Book, 1891-2013

By 1975, patient populations had dropped to 1/3 capacity at Winnebago MHI and a sister facility, Mendota Mental Health Institute, near Madison and politicians made efforts to close one of the Institutes. Governor Patrick Lucey (D) urged the Legislature to close Winnebago and Democrats in the State Assembly Finance committee supported that effort. However, Republicans in the State Senate voted to close the Mendota facility instead. Governor Lucey threatened to veto a budget that included funding for both facilities, but the Legislature ended up funding both anyway. In November 1975, Governor Lucey dropped his efforts to close Winnebago MHI. As of 2014, both facilities were still open. In 1977, the Central State Hospital for the Criminally Insane in Waupun, Wisconsin was converted from a prison hospital to Dodge Correctional Institution, a maximum security adult male correctional facility. Some of the patients, like Ed Gein, were transferred to Mendota.

In 2007, a newspaper reported that there had been three deaths and a rape at the hospital in a two-year period. This triggered renovations to reduce the opportunities for patients to commit suicide, though those renovations were later criticized as inadequate.

In 2011, WMHI was accredited by the Joint Commission (formerly the Joint Commission on Accreditation of Hospitals) and certified by the State of Wisconsin Division of Quality Assurance.

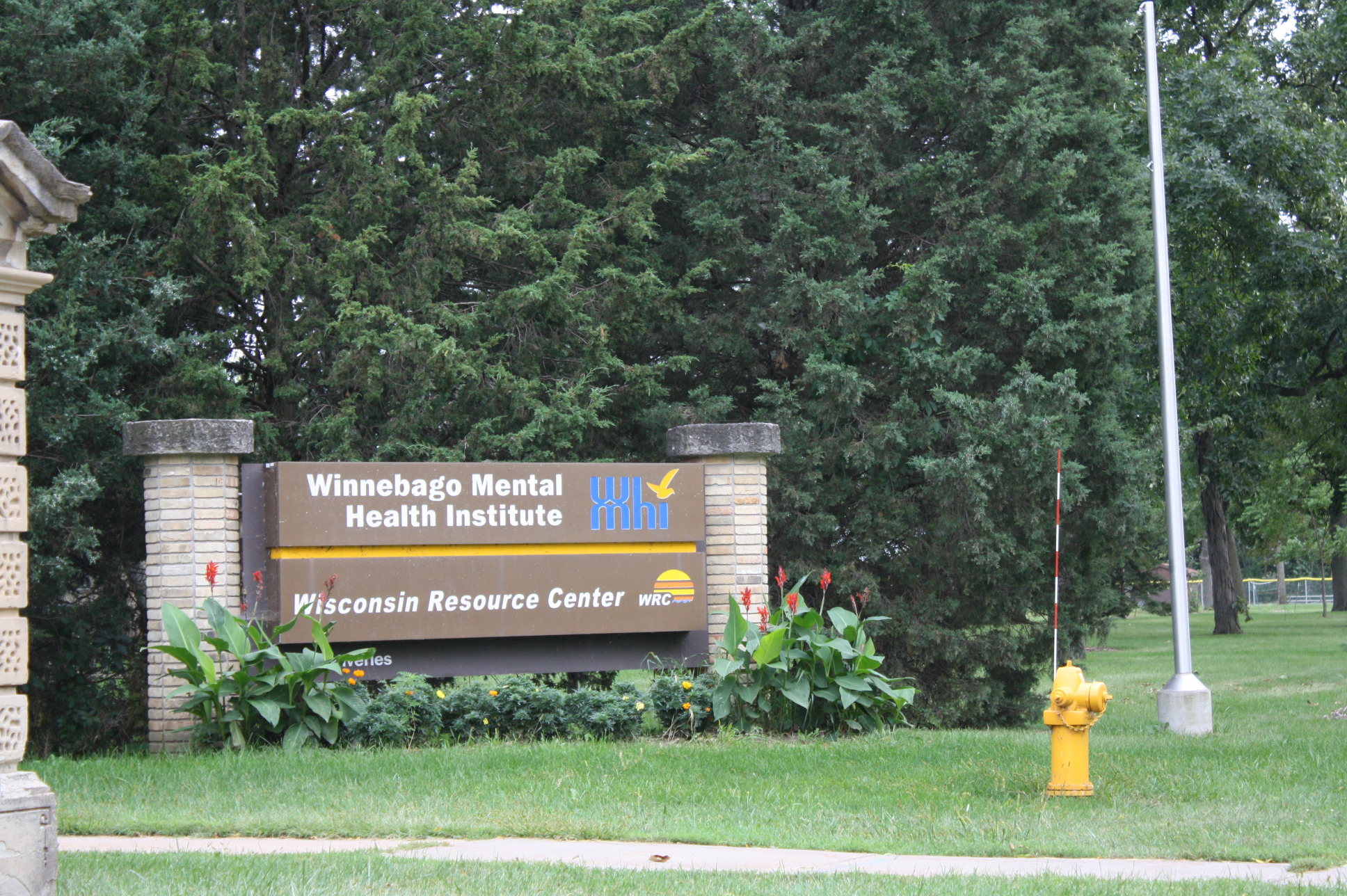
Sign at the main entrance

In 2012, the rated capacity of WMHI was 169 and the average daily population was 171. The capacity is "staffed capacity" and is based on funding and staffing rather than available number of beds.

The State hospital had a cemetery located south east of the facility on Asylum point. A sign at the site indicates the cemetery operated from 1872 to 1973. Very few of the graves have markers, but some have simple stones flush with the ground with a number on them.

== Notable patients ==
- Morgan Geyser, who attempted to murder Payton Leutner in 2014 and was found not guilty by reason of insanity
