= Bureau of Correctional Enterprises =

Prison industry program in Wisconsin, United States

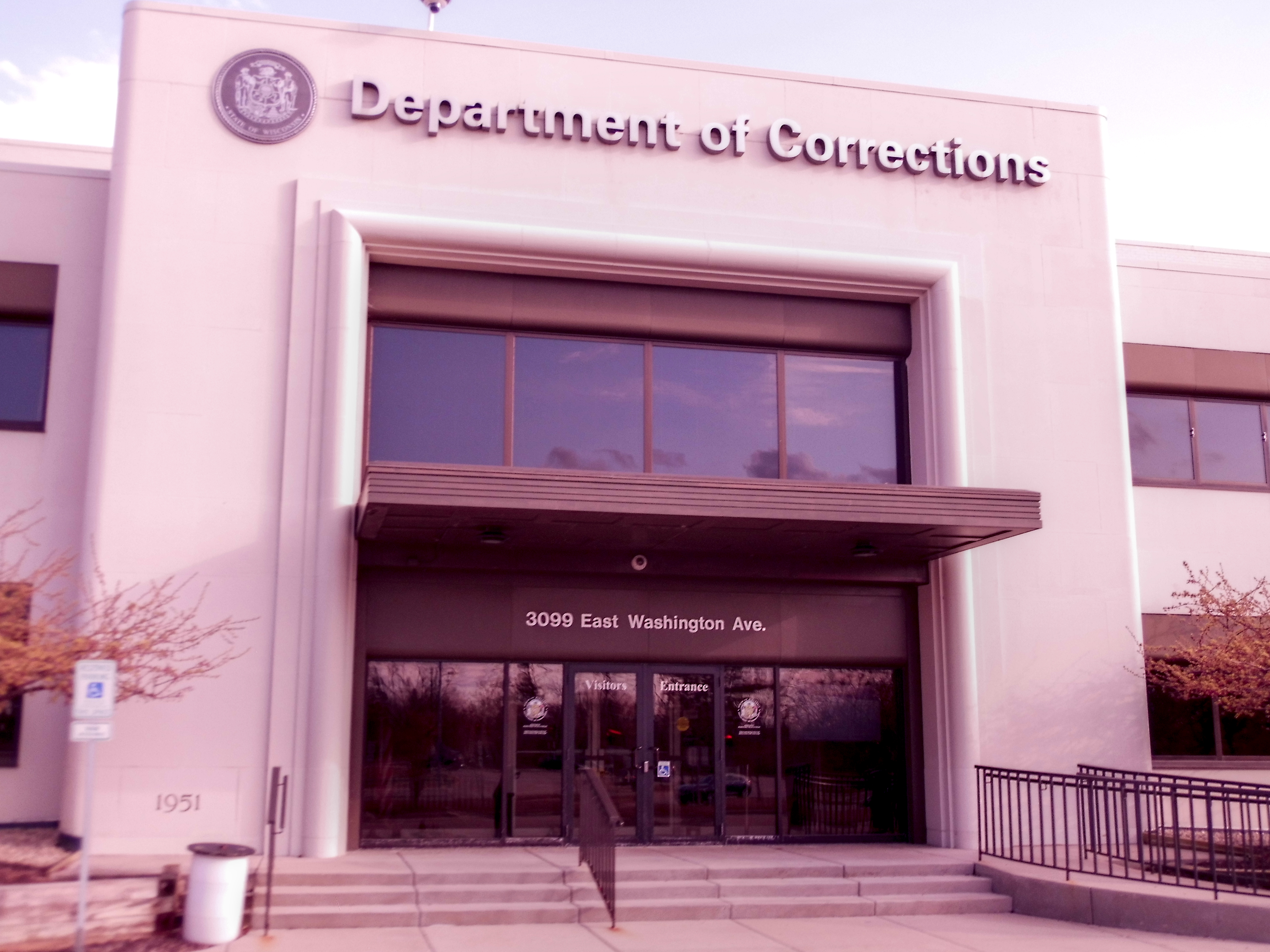
Entrance to Wisconsin Department of Corrections in Madison, WI

The Bureau of Correctional Enterprises (BCE) is a Wisconsin prison industry program established in 1913 within the Wisconsin Department of Corrections (DOC) that operates commercial industries including fabrication, furniture products, textiles and printing. The Bureau's stated aims are to provide work experience and training to incarcerated people while supplying goods and services primarily to state and public customers.

The BCE has been applauded for providing vocational training to prisoners who will soon be re-integrating into society, but also criticized for poor pay and working conditions, and for exploiting a Wisconsin prison population that has a heavily disproportionate rate of Black and minority incarceration. The University of Wisconsin System has faced backlash for holding a contract with BCE, which is required by state law.

== History ==
Prison industry in Wisconsin dates to the 19th century. After achieving statehood in 1848, Wisconsin authorized a state prison at Waupun, which opened in 1851. By the 1860s–1870s, the prison operated multiple shops—cabinetmaking, shoemaking, tailoring, and wagon works—and by 1878 sales of manufactured goods reportedly generated sufficient revenue to run the institution without drawing on the state treasury. By 1931 Wisconsin maintained 11 conservation and reforestation camps with hundreds of men working outside custody posts; prison-operated farms expanded during World War I to support the war effort.

During World War 2, German POWs were used as prison labor on Wisconsin farms.

The modern statutory framework for Wisconsin’s prison industries appears in Wisconsin Statutes Chapter 303, which defines eligible activities and restricts the sale of certain goods and services largely to public entities. The statutes emphasize that prison industries should operate profitably while meeting training and institutional goals.

== Organization ==
BCE is housed in the DOC’s Division of Adult Institutions and is organized into four components: Industries, Logistics, Agriculture, and Transition. The agriculture division runs two correctional farms (about 2,200 acres) with a dairy herd of roughly 1,100 cattle producing milk and ice cream. The industries and logistics arms include furniture and metal production, durable medical equipment refurbishment, printing, and large-scale laundry and linen rental primarily for state agencies and University of Wisconsin campuses.

The Transition Program is a voluntary statewide reentry service for incarcerated workers who participated in BCE, farms, or recycling projects. It focuses on employment readiness and placement support upon release. Financial and oversight data for BCE are periodically reported to the Legislature. For FY2023, the Wisconsin Legislative Fiscal Bureau summarized BCE’s operations and cash position, with a reported cash balance of $5M in 2022.

== Criticism ==
Critics of Wisconsin’s use of prison labor argue that low wages, limited worker protections, and coercion undermine rehabilitation and create market distortions that disadvantage private labor. Wisconsin law restricts many BCE sales to public entities to mitigate unfair competition, but advocacy groups contend that the state’s profit-oriented mandate can conflict with rehabilitative goals.

== See also ==
- Prison labor in the United States
- Wisconsin Department of Corrections
