= Mendota Mental Health Institute =

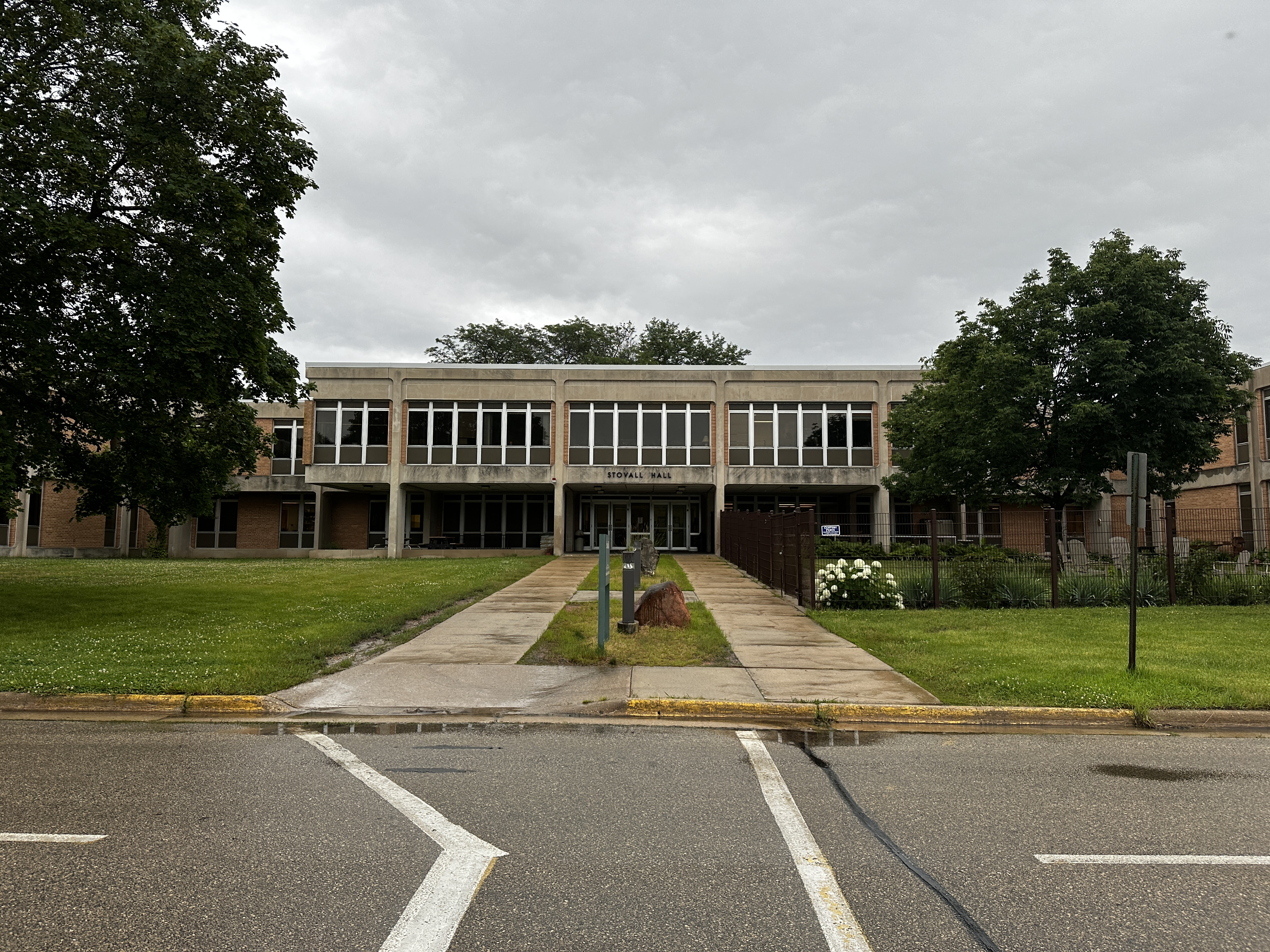
- Stovall Hall, one of MMHI's many housing units, pictured in July 2024

- Location in Wisconsin

Geography
- Location: Madison, Dane County, Wisconsin, United States
- Coordinates: 43.1320°N 89.4013°W

Organization
- Type: Specialist

Services
- Speciality: Psychiatric hospital

History
- Founded: July 14, 1860

Links
- Website: https://www.dhs.wisconsin.gov/mendota/index.htm
- Lists: Hospitals in Wisconsin

Mendota Mental Health Institute (MMHI) is a public psychiatric hospital in Madison, Wisconsin, United States, operated by the Wisconsin Department of Health Services. The hospital is accredited by the Joint Commission. Portions of the facility are included in the Wisconsin Memorial Hospital Historic District, District #88002183. The Mendota State Hospital Mound Group (NRHP #74000076) and Farwell's Point Mound Group (NRHP #74000069) are also located at the facility.

== History ==
The facility opened July 14, 1860, as the Wisconsin Hospital for the Insane. It was the first mental hospital in Wisconsin. In 1935, the facility was renamed Mendota State Hospital, and in 1974 it became Mendota Mental Health Institute. Its highest patient population was 1,300 in 1959. In 1997, there were fewer than 300 patients.

The Wisconsin Legislature first acted to construct a state asylum in 1854. They originally intended the facility to be based on the Worcester State Hospital in Massachusetts and sited on 105 acres (42 ha) of land purchased from former Governor Leonard J. Farwell (1852-1854). Plans fell apart in 1855 due to allegations of corruption and waste and the Legislature repealed the law after $27,000 ($967,500 today) had already been spent on the project.

The legislature acted again on the plan in 1857 and a Board of Commissioners was established to oversee the construction of the State Hospital for the Insane. Former Governor Leonard J. Farwell was selected as president of the commission. Land had already been purchased from Farwell for the project and the commission he led confirmed that it was the best location for the hospital. Architect Stephen Vaughn Shipman was commissioned to design the facility based on the Kirkbride Plan. Shipman later designed a sister facility near Oshkosh and several other Kirkbride plan asylums in Iowa and Illinois.

=== 1860 to 1930 ===
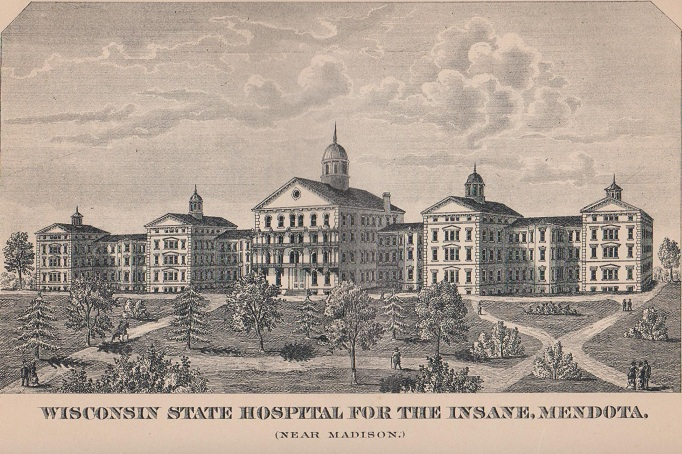
An early illustration of the Mendota Kirkbride plan facility, from the 1885 edition of the Wisconsin Blue Book.

The main building at the original Wisconsin State Hospital for the Insane opened in 1860 with its west wing added by 1862. As of 1881, the entire structure was 569 feet (173 m) long with the central portion being four stories and 65 by 120 feet (20 by 37 m). In 1879 an old chapel was converted into wards increasing capacity to accommodate 550 patients.

Around 1904, a three-story 154 by 57 feet (47 by 17 m) addition was made to the facility adjoining and to the north of the original central structure. It contained a dining room, two wards and bath facilities. This brought the facility to a "comfortable" capacity of around 600 with a daily average number of patients at 611 for the year ending June 30, 1908. Electric lighting replaced gas and kerosene light in 1906. Before 1927 a new power plant was added along with a nurses' home, a laundry facility and shops. A 50-bed building was also added for male patients. Closer to 1927, a 65 car garage was added as were new greenhouses, farm buildings and other out buildings.

In 1904, a Typhoid fever epidemic killed at least a dozen at Mendota, forced a quarantine of the facility and resulted in Superintendent Bullard's resignation in July 1904. The epidemic was traced to the sewage contaminated waters of Lake Mendota. A new sewage treatment facility was constructed in the 1920s. Prior to this, the facility dumped untreated sewage directly into Lake Mendota. In 1923, it was noted that the hospital was the "principal source of dangerous pollution," but that a treatment facility was under construction.

In 1925, the facility added a farm colony three miles north of the complex along Highway 113 in addition to a 226 acres (91 ha) institutional farm. It was added to allow some patients more activity and outdoor time and supplying the facility with additional farm produce. At the end of June 1926 there were 700 patients at the facility with a capacity of 706.

=== 1930 to 1970 ===
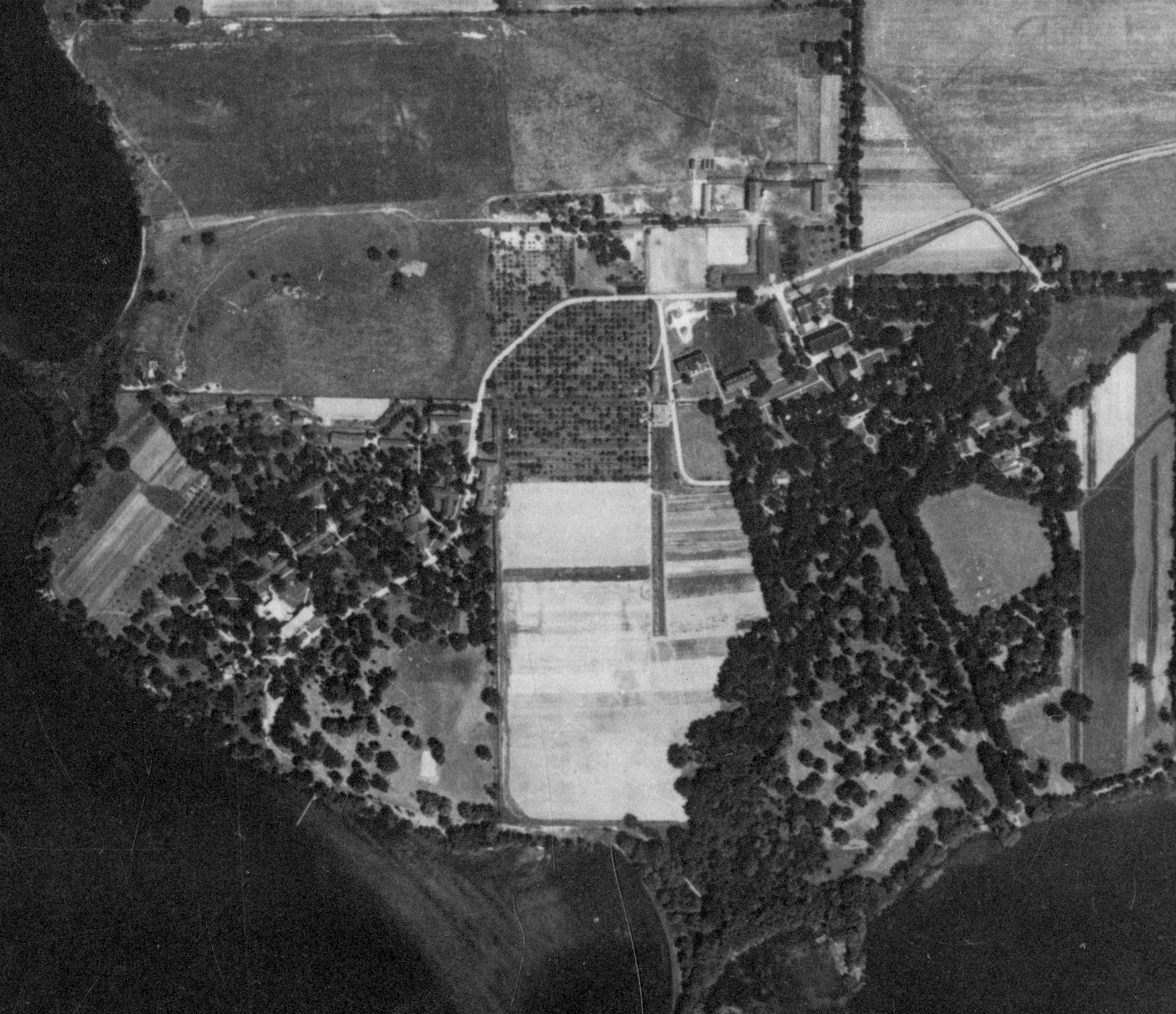
USDA aerial photo showing the Wisconsin Memorial Hospital campus on the left and Mendota State Hospital complex on the right, July 1937.

By 1932, the facility housed 869 patients with 166 staff members and an official capacity of 790.

Scandal erupted in 1934 following several deaths, a poisoning and allegations of beatings and misconduct by caretakers. Legislative hearings were held in 1934 concerning the deaths of Guy Clark Lyman and Marie Anderson in 1931. Anderson was found to have died from arsenic poisoning and Lyman was said to have died of pneumonia, although it was alleged that he was beaten by another patient or staff member. Attempts were made to oust Doctor M. K. Green, Mendota superintendent, but he remained in his position until 1948.

A statewide inquiry initiated after the death of a patient at Winnebago State Hospital covered several state facilities and lasted from February to July 1934. It resulted in around 30 dismissals of staff and officials from state mental health facilities in Mendota, Winnebago and Waupun. An asylum guard was acquitted by a jury on two manslaughter counts, but was discharged from Winnebago. The Legislative committee sought to compensate the widow for his death.

In the 1940s, a number of newspaper reports decried the facility as a "firetrap" with patients occupying attic areas of the building.

New structures were built in the 1950s to replace the 90-year-old building. Lorenz Hall, the food service building and power plant structure were dedicated in late November 1956 by Wisconsin Governor Walter J. Kohler Jr. Lorenz Hall was named for Dr. William Lorenz. Goodland Hall, named for Governor Walter S. Goodland, was still under construction at that time. Stovall Hall was constructed prior to 1967 and named for Dr. William D. Stovall (1887-1971). Kohler said at the dedication that it had been his goal to demolish the old Kirkbride plan buildings at Mendota and Winnebago hospitals. In one of his last ceremonial functions as Governor he said that he "would never rest until these ancient, gray firetraps are completely demolished." He lamented that it would take another six years to meet that goal.

The original structure was still around in 1960 for its centennial and was known as "Old Main", but the second and third floors of the wings were not being used for patients due to fire-related safety concerns. However, after replacement structures finished in the late 1950s and early 1960s, demolition began on the west wing of Old Main starting in September 1964.

=== 1970s to Present ===
Average daily patient population

Year	Pat.
1860	7
1870	362
1879	425
1890	502
1900	405
1910	640
1920	661
1931	802

Year	Pat.
1940	730
1950	774
1960	966
1970	522
1980	202
1990	266
2000	268
2010	240

Source: Wisconsin Blue Book, 1880 - 2011

In the late 1960s and early 1970s the Program of Assertive Community Treatment (PACT) was developed at Mendota. A community-based treatment, rehabilitation, and supportive services program aimed at helping those with severe and persistent mental illness avoid psychiatric hospitalization and live independently in the community, the program was a forerunner of many other similar programs throughout the world. In 1974, MMHI received the American Psychiatric Association's Gold Achievement Award for the program, also known as the "Madison model". It is the only psychiatric facility in Wisconsin to have received the award.

By 1975, patient populations had dropped to 1/3 capacity at Mendota MHI and a sister facility, Winnebago Mental Health Institute, near Oshkosh and politicians made efforts to close one of the Institutes. Governor Patrick Lucey (D) urged the Legislature to close Winnebago and Democrats in the State Assembly Finance committee supported that effort. However, Republicans in the State Senate voted to close the Mendota facility instead. Governor Lucey threatened to veto a budget that included funding for both facilities, but the Legislature ended up funding both anyway. In November 1975, Governor Lucey dropped his efforts to close Winnebago MHI. As of 2014, both facilities were still open. In 1977, the Central State Hospital for the Criminally Insane in Waupun, Wisconsin was converted from a prison hospital to Dodge Correctional Institution, a maximum security adult male correctional facility. Some of the patients, like Ed Gein, were transferred to Mendota.

In 2007, state officials admitted that there was an inappropriate, intimate relationship between a female caregiver and male patient at MMHI. The caregiver resigned in March 2006 after other patients witnessed the two kissing. A federal judge ruled that the state was not liable for medical malpractice in the case, but the state ended up settling with the patient for $162,000 in August 2008. In November 2010, another female nursing assistant was charged with 2nd degree sexual assault of a male patient at MMHI. An internal investigation revealed that the two have been having sexual contact from November 2009 to April 2010 when complaints were made to staff. She was fired and the case was referred to law enforcement.

In July 2010, federal investigators said the Mendota Mental Health Institute failed to provide adequate treatment for its patients. As a result, the Institute lost its Centers for Medicare and Medicaid Services (CMS) federal certification for its Adult Assessment Treatment Unit (AATU), amounting to a loss of about $1 million in federal reimbursement for Medicare patients. According to Dane County executive, Kathleen Falk, county tax payers would now have to pay for hospital costs for patients referred to the hospital by the county court system instead of being paid for by Medicare. Officials at the Institute said that they could not comply with Federal rules that conflicted with state laws, for example the state allows patients to refuse group treatment, but federal rules require group participation. According to MMHI, the loss of certification and Medicare funding primarily affected Medicare eligible patients under age 22 and over 64. CMS Certification of other units was not affected. In September 2010, MMHI announced they would not be accepting additional patients in the adult assessment treatment unit (AATU) after December 1, 2010.

In December 2010, a patient was found dead in a seclusion room 18 hours after he committed suicide. Staffers had assumed he was asleep but he had strangled himself with a sock. In 2014, the state paid $562,500 to the estate of the patient, but admitted no liability for the incident.

In 2012, the rated capacity of MMHI was 234 and the average daily population was 222. The capacity is "staffed capacity" and is based on funding and staffing rather than available number of beds.

In 2014, the state announced that all civil patients in state facilities would be treated at Winnebago MHI near Oshkosh and Mendota MHI would only treat criminal patients. Prior to this change, adult male civil patients were admitted to Mendota while female and juvenile patients were treated at Winnebago. The change freed up space at MMHI for more criminal patients. Law enforcement officials in the Madison area have objected to the increased transportation time and costs of transporting patients to Oshkosh.

== Wisconsin Memorial Hospital ==
- Wisconsin Memorial Hospital
- U.S. Historic district – Contributing property
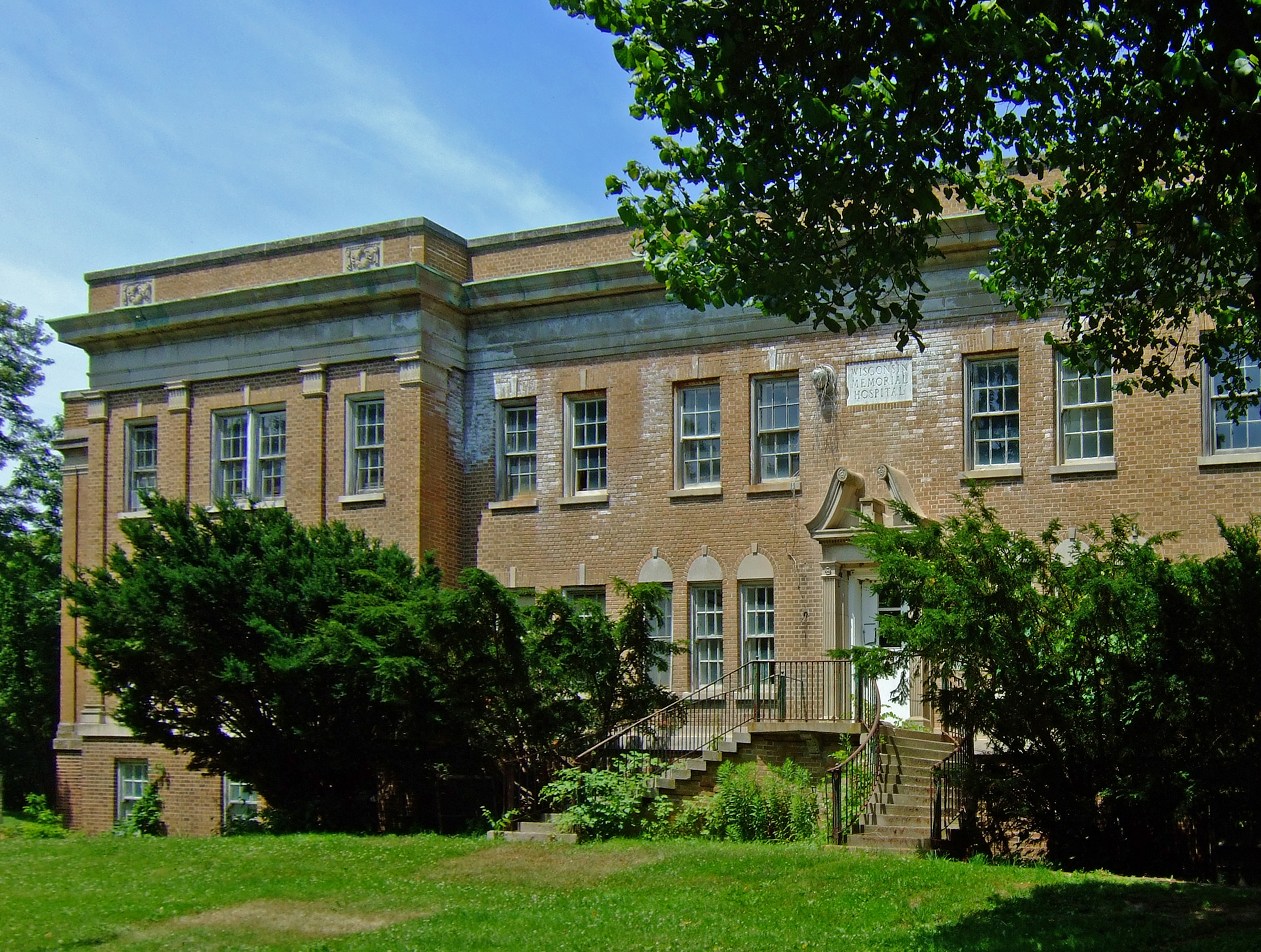
- The main building of the Wisconsin Memorial Hospital

- Location within Wisconsin Location within the United States
- Location: Madison, Wisconsin
- Part of: Wisconsin Memorial Hospital Historic District (ID88002183)
- Added to NRHP: November 3, 1988

Wisconsin Memorial Hospital Historic District, District #88002183 was listed on November 3, 1988. The district includes the main two-story brick building and 17 "Tudor-inspired Craftsman style" cottages in a campus like setting. The Wisconsin Memorial Hospital Historic district includes structures in the Farwell Point area to the west of Lorenz Hall and south of Goodland Hall. It does not include most of the main structures built since the 1950s.

Construction began on the Wisconsin Memorial Hospital in the fall of 1921 with the two-story, brick main hospital building finished in early 1923. The facility was created for the treatment of mental illnesses of World War I veterans. The main building has been closed and vacant since 1994 and does not comply with fire code. In 2009, the state attempted to demolish the structure and had signed with a contractor to do so for $541,000. However, demolition plans were dropped following media coverage and claims that refurbishment could be done at little cost to the state. As of October 2010, renovation and demolition were both off the table for the vacant building. Refurbishment was estimated to cost over $6 million. As of 2014, Mendota Mental Health Institute still utilizes some of the cottages.

Wisconsin ran the Memorial Hospital until 1937 and was reimbursed by the federal government for operations. Starting in 1937, the Veterans Administration leased Memorial hospital for $1 a year for the treatment of mentally ill veterans. The VA returned the facility to Wisconsin in July 1948. Veteran patients were transferred to a new VA facility, Tomah Veterans Administration Hospital, in Tomah, Wisconsin. It was known as Veterans Administration hospital, Farwell's Point during the period it was operated by the VA.

When conceived, the State Memorial Hospital was not administratively part of Mendota State Hospital. The Memorial Hospital buildings came under the control of the Mendota State Hospital after the VA moved patients to Tomah and returned the facility to the state in July 1948. This was the only expansion of Mendota State Hospital from 1904 to 1952. Regaining control of Memorial Hospital from the Veterans Administration allowed the state to move patients out of the 90-year-old main building and out of upper floors while replacement facilities were constructed in the 1950s.

== Facilities ==
Mendota Mental Health Institute has a number of buildings.

- Administration Building, c.1960s
- Goodland Hall, after 1956
  - West Wing, Maximum security unit. Secure Assessment Treatment Unit (SATU), Management Treatment Unit (MTU), Treatment Rehabilitation And Care Unit #1 (TRAC 1), Assessment-Treatment Unit (ATU)
  - East Wing, Medium security unit. Medium Admission Treatment Unit (MATU), Medium Admission Rehabilitation Unit (MARU), Treatment Rehabilitation Unit (TRU)
- Lakeside Building, houses the Institute Safety Director, the Director of Housekeeping Services, the Housekeeping Supervisor, and Management Information Services.
- Lorenz Hall, dedicated in 1956, medium-security units. Treatment Rehabilitation And Care Unit #2 (TRAC 2) program, and Intensive Treatment Unit (ITU).
- Lorenz Hall annex, houses Mendota Juvenile Treatment Center
- Stovall Hall, 1960s. Civil, medium and minimum-security units, respectively. Geropsychiatric Treatment Unit (GTU) (the only civil unit now at Mendota, Treatment-Rehabilitation-Assessment-Care Unit #3 West (TRAC 3-West), and Treatment-Rehabilitation-Assessment-Care Unit #3 East (TRAC 3-East)
- Power plant, dedicated in 1956

== Mound Groups ==
- Mendota State Hospital Mound Group
- U.S. National Register of Historic Places
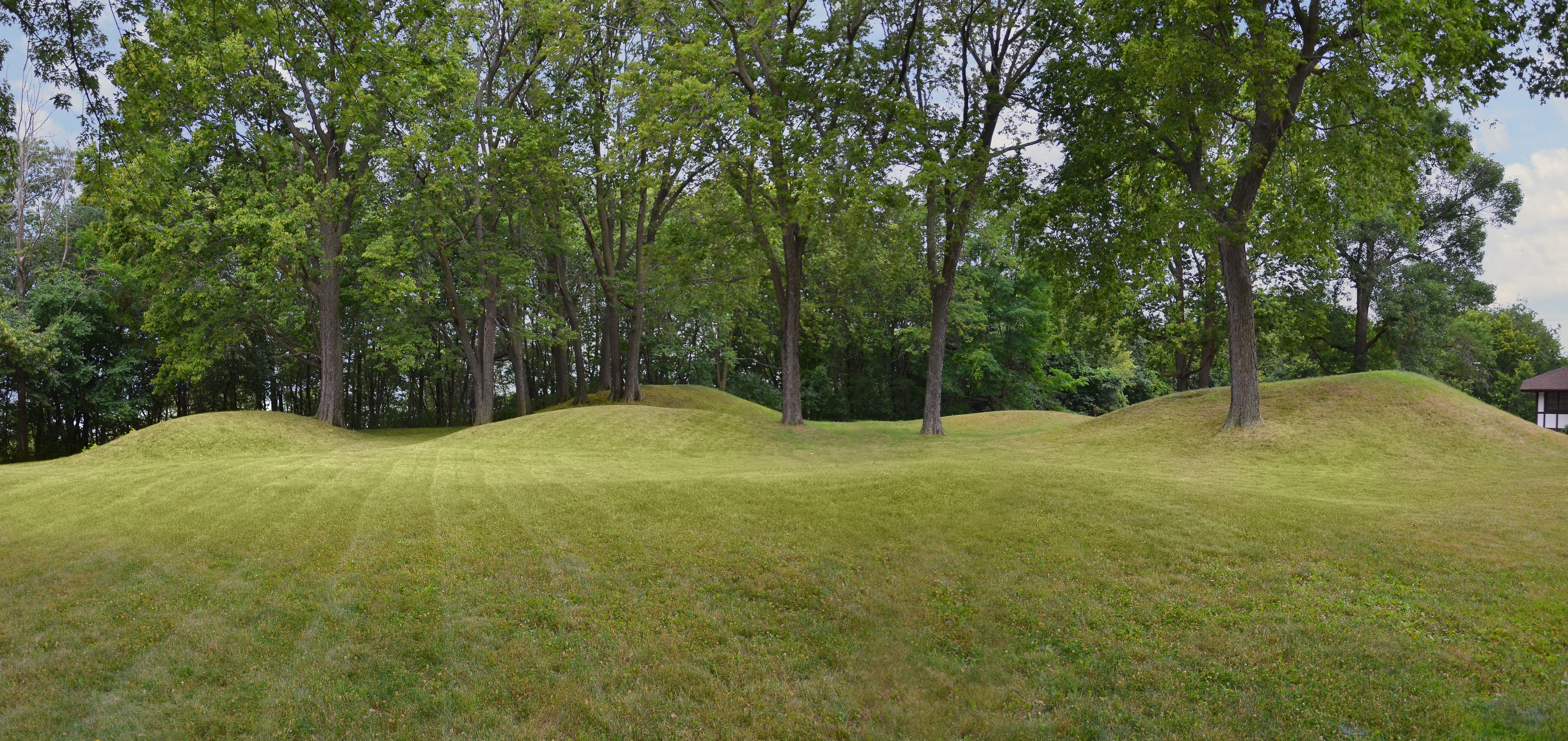
- Effigy mounds from the Late Woodland Period (ca. 650 AD to 1200 AD) on the grounds of the Mendota Health Institute.
- Location: Madison, Wisconsin
- NRHP reference No.: 74000076
- Added to NRHP: December 27, 1974

The Mendota State Hospital Mound Group is located on MMHI grounds. The effigy mounds were listed on the National Register of Historic Places on December 27, 1974 (#74000076). The largest of the mounds is said to be an eagle or thunderbird that originally had a 624 feet (190 m) wingspan. MMHI's eagle logo is based on this mound. Around the eagle are other smaller birds, bears, a water spirit, another water spirit with a curved tail sometimes interpreted as a squirrel, a group of conical mounds, several linear mounds, and a four-legged deer effigy. A village stood on the terrace between these mounds and Lake Mendota about 1000 CE.

- Farwell's Point Mound Group
- U.S. National Register of Historic Places
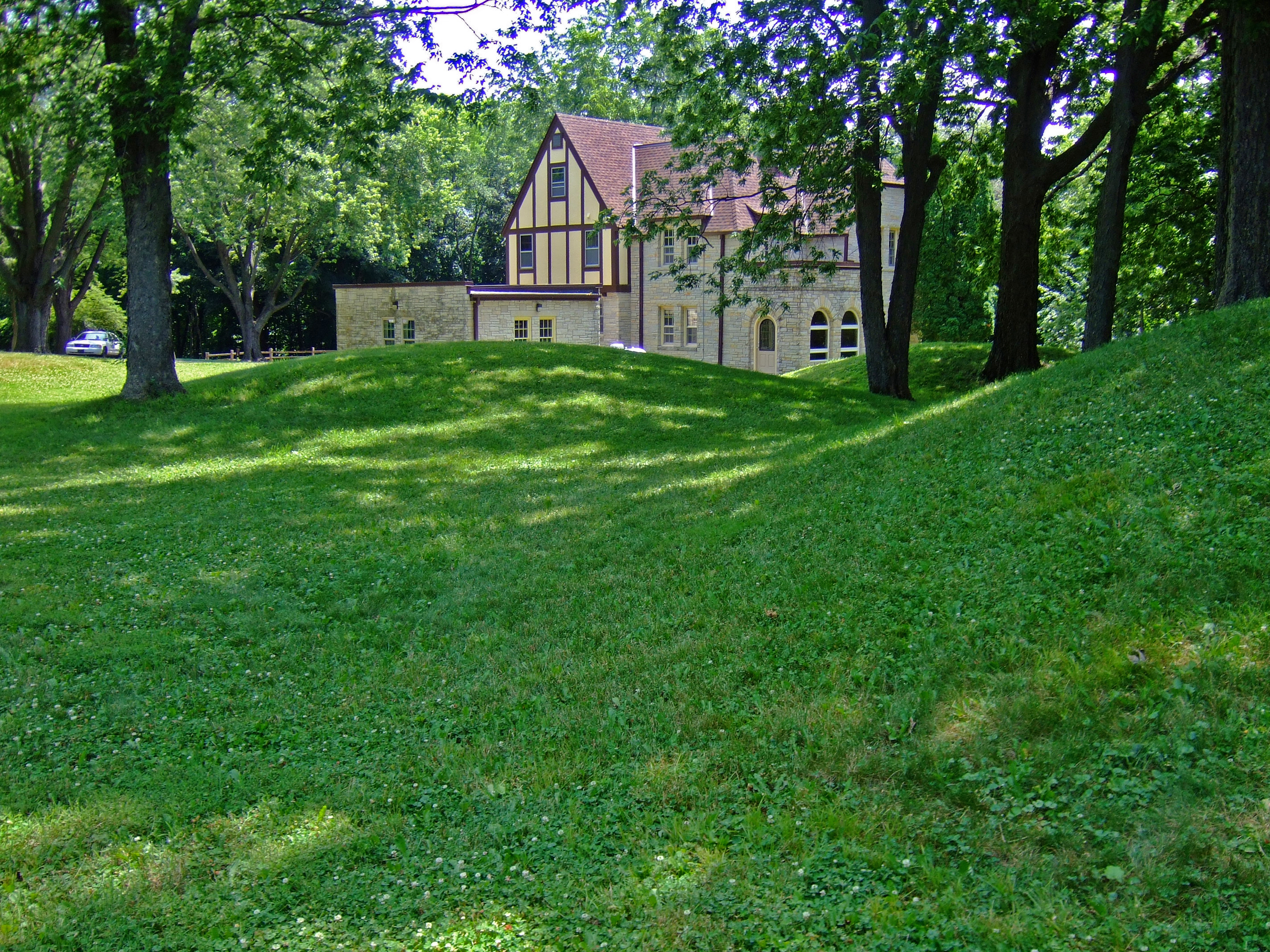
- A Farwell's Point Mound with Urben House in the background. Designed by Arthur Peabody, Urben House is a historic structure part of the Wisconsin Memorial Hospital Historic district and named for Walter J. Urben a former superintendent of Mendota State Hospital.
- Location: Madison, Wisconsin
- NRHP reference No.: 74000069
- Added to NRHP: December 27, 1974

Farwell's Point Mound Group is located in the area surrounding the Wisconsin Memorial Hospital mostly within the Memorial Hospital Historical District boundary in the western part of the MMHI grounds. The effigy mounds were listed on the National Register of Historic Places on December 27, 1974 (#74000069). The site contains 11 conical mounds and remnants of 2 panthers, a bird, and 3 linear mounds. One of the conical mounds was dug into in the 1800s and inside was a stone burial vault containing human remains. Farwell's Point was named for Wisconsin Governor Leonard J. Farwell who owned property in that vicinity.

== Mendota Memorial Cemetery ==
The Mendota State hospital had a cemetery for patients that died at the facility located about 1/2 mile north of the original complex. It now sits amongst the houses of the North Mendota neighborhood in Madison, next to the Central Wisconsin Center. Between 1860 and 1912, 1,702 patients died at the facility, though not all were buried at the cemetery. The Central Wisconsin Center, a state facility for individuals with developmental disabilities, is administratively separate from MMHI, but it is across the road from it on property listed as owned by "Mendota State Hospital" in county records.

== Gallery ==
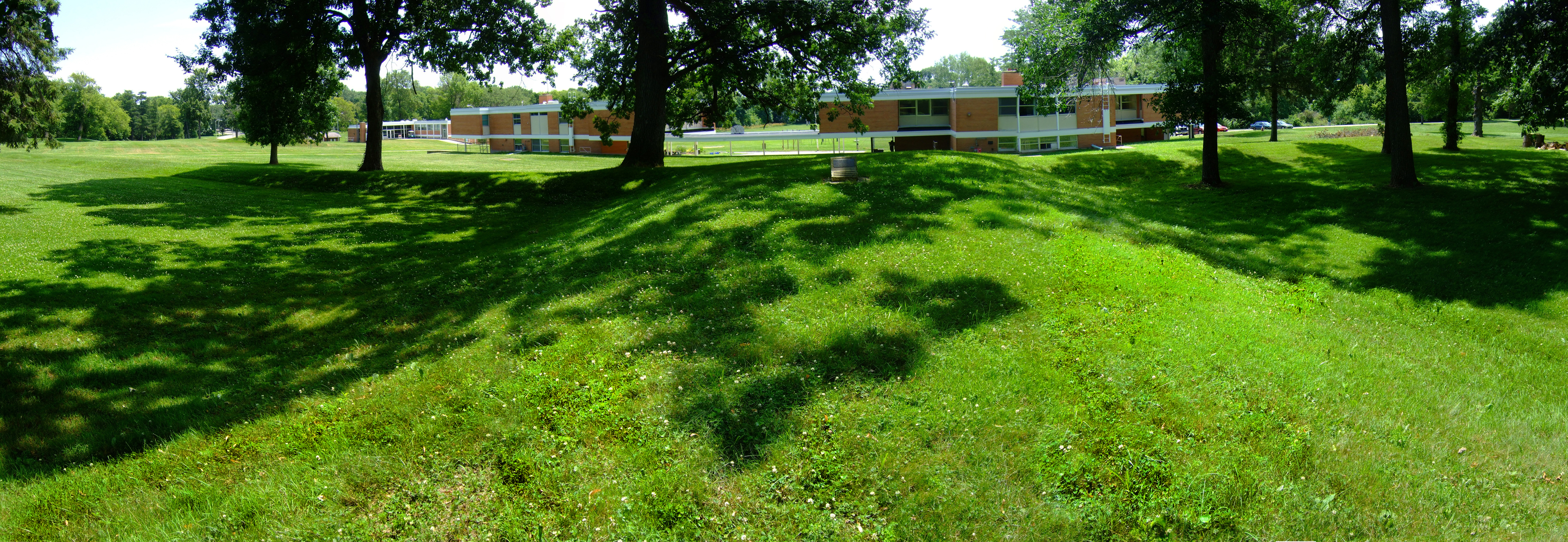
The largest Eagle mound as viewed from the tail looking approximately SSE toward the eagle's head and Cottage "A" and "B".

== See also ==
- Winnebago Mental Health Institute, site of a sister facility, the Northern Hospital for the Insane, completed in 1873
