= Mendota Juvenile Treatment Center =

Juvenile psychiatric facility In Madison, Wisconsin

Coordinates: 43°07′55.3″N 89°24′09.3″W

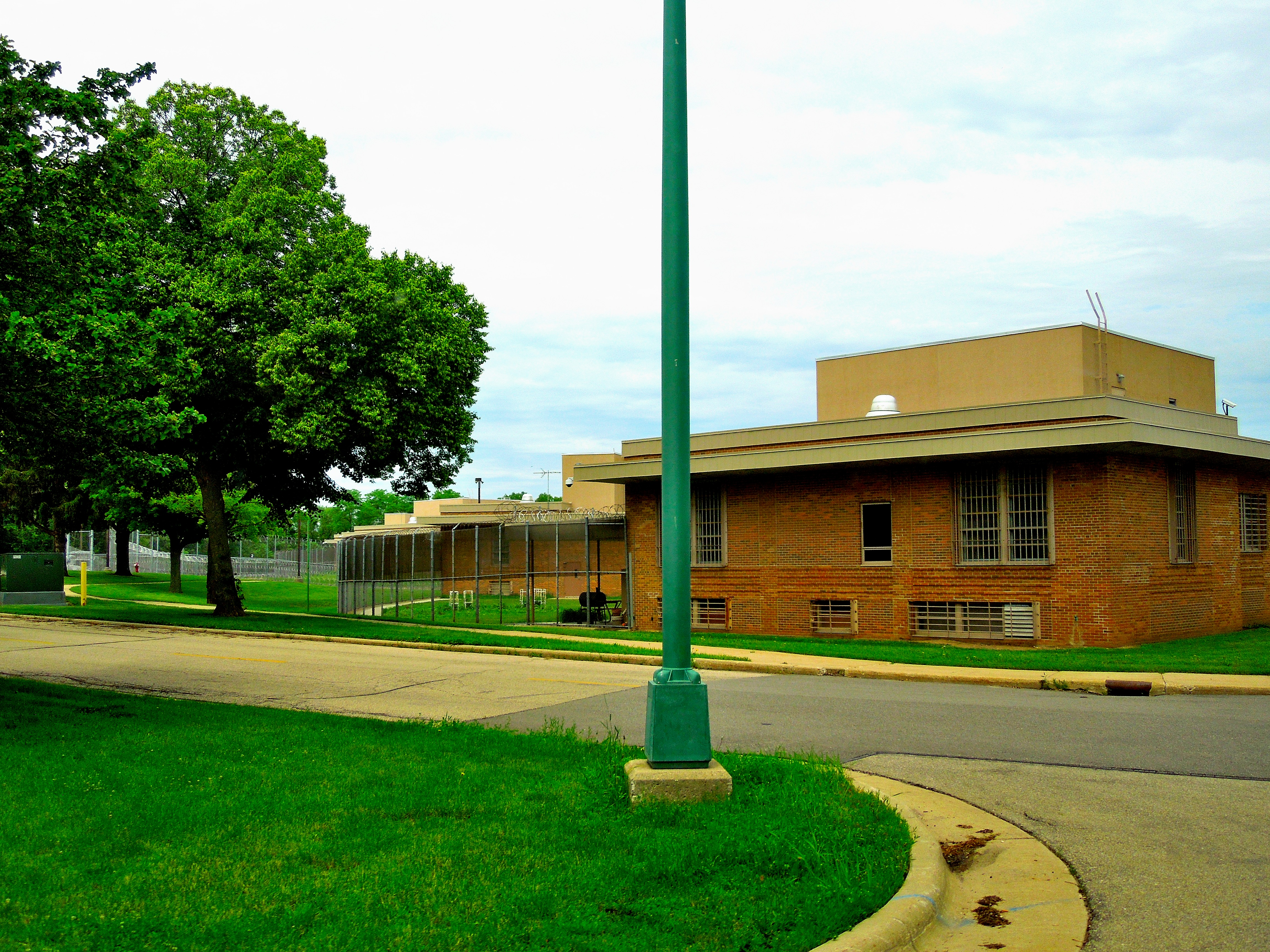
- Mendota Mental Health MJTC Annex in 2013

Geography
- Location: Wisconsin, United States

History
- Opened: 1995

Links
- Lists: Hospitals in Wisconsin

Mendota Juvenile Treatment Center (MJTC) is a juvenile hybrid juvenile corrections/psychiatric facility under the administration of the Wisconsin Department of Health Services, and operated by the Mendota Mental Health Institute (MMHI) in Madison, Wisconsin. It has space for 94 patients. The youths at MJTC typically have an extensive history of antisocial behavior. It uses the Mendota Juvenile Treatment Center Program.

The impetus for the facility's creation was an increase in violent crime perpetrated by minors. It was established in 1995 by two psychologists, Michael Caldwell and Greg Van Rybroek. It was deliberately staffed with psychologists instead of regular prison guards; while most facilities for delinquent and criminal youth are operated by the Wisconsin Department of Corrections, MJTC is under the health services department instead.

Mendota Juvenile Treatment Center Program (MJTC) is an intensive mental health intervention for violent and treatment resistant youth in a juvenile correctional facility.

== Summary ==
The MJTC treatment program was developed for and implemented in the Mendota Juvenile Treatment Center in 1995. The Mendota Juvenile Treatment Center is a secured correctional facility located on the grounds of the Mendota Mental Health Institute in Madison, Wisconsin. It is operated as a secured correctional facility through the department of corrections, but housed on the grounds of a State mental health facility. Youth who are transferred to MJTC are selected by the staff of juvenile corrections institutions due to their failure to respond to the traditional rehabilitative programming provided in correctional institutions, nearly always because of their excessively violent and/or disruptive behavior. While MJTC was not designed to treat psychopathy per se, many of the youth in the facility do have high levels of psychopathic traits.

== Treatment features ==
The MJTC program is based on the theory of defiance and the social control theory. The theory of defiance can be used to describe a subgroup of offenders who react to punishments for crimes by increasing the frequency or seriousness of violent or other criminal behavior. Further punishment becomes cyclical as the youth's behavior continues to worsen in reaction to increasingly severe punishments. The cycle further isolates the youth from conventional goals and values and he/she becomes "compressed" or "trapped" into an increasingly defiant behavior pattern. In addition, the choices the youth has available are also "compressed" and the options for treatment available to the staff and treatment programs are "compressed" to focus on managing the risks the youth poses. The social control theory posits that when the social bonds that connect the youth to conventional society are strained, delinquency arises. For delinquent youth, barriers have developed that restrict the youth's ability and desire to form conventional and productive social bonds, which in turn facilitates increased antisocial behavior. These patterns of antisocial behavior, even in the face of punishment, and have prevented this subgroup of antisocial youth from engaging in traditional rehabilitative programs in the juvenile correctional system.

MJTC uses a variation of the decompression treatment model and multi-modal cognitive-behavioral treatment. Primary themes of the program include helping youth accept responsibility for their behavior, resolving mental health and trauma issues, and helping to build positive relationships with families. The MJTC program focuses on helping youth develop appropriate social skills, and to help youth replace delinquent associations and behaviors with pro-social relationships and activities. In so doing, the aim of MJTC is to break the compression cycle of increasing antagonistic, violent and antisocial defiance of authority and to replace it with appropriate pro-social bonds.

MJTC also uses a behavioral point system called the Today-Tomorrow Program. The point system closely monitors and is highly responsive to changes in the youth's behavior. Through the point system, youth earn privileges for periods of positive behavior. Youth receive points at the end of the day based on their behavior and engagement in the treatment, and these points determine privileges for the following day. In addition to daily privileges, youth can earn additional, increasing privileges such as computer game time, snacks or private music, for accumulating points over several days. The Today-Tomorrow program incentivizes treatment engagement and appropriate behavior by rewarding engagement with the treatment program with increasingly desirable privileges.

In addition to individual therapy guided by the decompression model and the Today-Tomorrow Program, MJTC further assists youth by providing educational services, individual therapy, occupational therapy, and a variety of other therapies covering topics such as anger management, substance abuse, social skills, and problem solving.

MJTC is smaller and more intensive than standard juvenile corrections institutions. The original MJTC is about half the size of JCI units. Similarly, the ratio of clinical staff to residents is about twice that of more typical juvenile corrections units, allowing MJTC to provide much greater treatment resources to antisocial youth. Staff at MJTC consists of one psychiatrist on staff for every 14 youth, one psychologist for every 14 youth, one social worker for every 10 youth, and a psychiatric nurse. Additionally, psychology practicum students and psychology interns provide care. Each youth in MJTC participates in several weekly individual counseling sessions with a psychologist, psychiatrist, front-line CNA staff, and/or social workers. The average length of time in treatment at MJTC ranges from 45 to 83 weeks.

== Efficacy ==
Research has found MJTC to be more efficacious at treating institutionalized youth than standard JCI rehabilitation programs. The program had the greatest impact on serious violent offenses, reducing the risk of their incidence by about half. Youth in the treatment group were more than 6 times less likely to engage in felony violence than the comparison group youth, and had longer periods of time in the community before the first re-offense. Although their general recidivism rates were similar, only one fifth of the MJTC-treated youths were involved in institutional or community violence within 2 years after release, compared to approximately half of the comparison cases. Furthermore the length of treatment in MJTC significantly predicted improvement in interpersonal functioning and behavioral control.

== Dissemination ==
The MJTC program has been adopted and adapted by four other sites, including adjudicated female youth, youth held for a short stay, and individuals committed under the Wisconsin Sexually Violent Persons Law. As of 2010, approximately 800 juveniles and 100 adults have been treated with MJTC.

Due to the intensive nature of the program, and the high ratio of mental health professionals to youth, the costs of the MJTC program are more than double that of treatment as usual at standard JCI's. However, because participation in the program typically results in a shorter length of stay, overall correctional costs increase only 4.5%, or by approximately $7,000 per youth. Furthermore, the improved treatment progress and lowered recidivism, especially for the most violent crimes, suggests that while the initial costs of the treatment are higher, the long term costs of repeated and longer prison sentences, and physical and emotional harm to society may be far greater. In fact, one study reported that the MJTC treatment program yielded a benefit-cost ratio of more than 7 to 1 over treatment as usual.

Implementation materials including training, support, and participant worksheets and handouts can be obtained from the developer. However, step-by-step implementation guidance is not provided. A criticism of the implementation materials for the MJTC program is that many of the participant handouts assume a high level of reading comprehension for youth.
