= Patrick Fiedler =

American lawyer and judge

Wisconsin Circuit Judge for the Dane Circuit, Branch 8
- In office November 24, 1993 – September 2011
- Appointed by: Tommy Thompson
- Preceded by: Susan R. Steingass
- Succeeded by: Frank D. Remington

2nd Secretary of the Wisconsin Department of Corrections
- In office January 7, 1991 – November 24, 1993
- Appointed by: Tommy Thompson
- Preceded by: Stephen E. Bablitch
- Succeeded by: Michael Sullivan

United States Attorney for the Western District of Wisconsin
- In office August 31, 1987 – January 7, 1991 (acting before Feb. 25, 1988)
- President: Ronald Reagan; George H. W. Bush
- Preceded by: John R. Byrnes
- Succeeded by: Kevin C. Potter

Personal details
- Born: 1953 (age 72–73) Mineral Point, Wisconsin, U.S.
- Spouse: Sandy
- Children: 3
- Parent: James Fiedler (father)
- Education: University of Wisconsin–Milwaukee (B.B.A.); Marquette University Law School (J.D.)
- Profession: Lawyer

Patrick J. Fiedler (born 1953) is an American lawyer, mediator, and jurist from Wisconsin. He was a Wisconsin circuit court judge in Dane County for 18 years, from 1993 to 2011. Earlier in his career, he was the 2nd secretary of the Wisconsin Department of Corrections, in the cabinet of governor Tommy Thompson, and he served as United States Attorney for the Western District of Wisconsin, appointed by President Ronald Reagan. In the year after he left the judgeship, Fiedler also served as president of the State Bar of Wisconsin.

== Biography ==
Patrick Fiedler was born and raised in Mineral Point, Wisconsin; he graduated from Mineral Point High School in 1971. After a brief pause in his education, he went on to attend the University of Wisconsin–Milwaukee, where he earned his bachelor's in business administration in 1977. He decided to attend law school at Marquette University Law School, receiving his J.D. in May 1980.

After graduating law school, Fiedler was hired as an assistant district attorney in Waukesha County, Wisconsin. After four years at the district attorney's office, he worked for a year as an attorney in private practice with the firm Runkel, Runkel & Ansay. In 1985, he moved back to Iowa County, Wisconsin, and set up a law firm partnership then known as Hamilton, Mueller, and Fiedler, in Dodgeville.

In January 1987, Wisconsin's western district United States Attorney, John R. Byrnes, announced his resignation. The Reagan administration accepted applicants for the position from Wisconsin attorneys, and Fiedler was quickly identified as one of the finalists. President Ronald Reagan indicated in May 1987 that he planned to nominate Fiedler for the role. Fiedler took over as acting U.S. attorney in August 1987, but was not officially nominated until November of that year. He was confirmed by the United States Senate on February 25, 1988.

After accepting the job as U.S. attorney, Fiedler moved to Madison, Wisconsin—the location of the principal courthouse of the Western District of Wisconsin—where he has subsequently maintained his primary residence. He served four years as U.S. attorney, during which time he was active in prosecuting the war on drugs.

After winning his second term as Governor of Wisconsin, Tommy Thompson tapped Fiedler to serve as secretary of the Wisconsin Department of Corrections, succeeding the first person to hold that office, Stephen E. Bablitch. Fiedler served nearly three years as secretary of the Department of Corrections, until Thompson appointed him to serve as a Wisconsin circuit court judge in Dane County, Wisconsin, in the Fall of 1993.

Fiedler was sworn in as judge on November 24, 1993, with his father, Iowa County circuit judge James Fiedler, administering the oath. He went on to win a full term as judge in the April 1994 election, and was re-elected in 2000 and 2006.

Fiedler announced his retirement from the court in September 2011, leaving office with a year left on his term. He returned to private practice, joining the Axley Brynelson law firm. After three years, he left that firm and joined Hurley Burish, S.C., where he continues to practice law. He was elected president of the State Bar of Wisconsin in 2013.

== Personal life and family ==
Patrick Fiedler is a son of James Fiedler. James Fiedler was a prominent attorney in Mineral Point; he served 24 years as a county judge and Wisconsin circuit court judge, and he was chief judge of the 7th district of Wisconsin circuit courts in the 1980s.

Patrick Fiedler and his wife, Sandy, have three adult children.

Government offices
Preceded by Stephen E. Bablitch	Secretary of the Wisconsin Department of Corrections; January 7, 1991 – November 24, 1993	Succeeded by Michael Sullivan
Legal offices
Preceded by John R. Byrnes	United States Attorney for the Western District of Wisconsin; August 31, 1987 – January 7, 1991	Succeeded by Kevin C. Potter
Preceded by Susan R. Steingass	Wisconsin Circuit Judge for the Dane Circuit, Branch 8 November 24, 1993 – September 2011	Succeeded by Frank D. Remington
