= Jon Litscher =

American politician

4th & 9th Secretary of the Wisconsin Department of Corrections
- In office March 15, 2016 – June 11, 2018
- Governor: Scott Walker
- Preceded by: Ed Wall
- Succeeded by: Cathy Jess
- In office January 8, 1999 – January 3, 2003
- Governor: Tommy Thompson
- Preceded by: Michael J. Sullivan
- Succeeded by: Matthew J. Frank

6th Secretary of the Wisconsin Department of Employment Relations
- In office January 7, 1991 – January 8, 1999
- Governor: Tommy Thompson
- Preceded by: Constance Beck
- Succeeded by: Peter Fox

Personal details
- Born: October 22, 1944 (age 81) Beaver Dam, Wisconsin, U.S.
- Party: Republican
- Education: University of Wisconsin–Whitewater; University of Wisconsin–Milwaukee

Jon E. Litscher (born October 22, 1944) is a retired American public administrator and politician from Beaver Dam, Wisconsin. He served as the 4th and 9th secretary of the Wisconsin Department of Corrections (1999–2003; 2016–2018), serving under governors Tommy Thompson and Scott Walker. He earlier served seven years under Thompson as secretary of the Wisconsin Department of Employment Relations (1992–1999).

== Biography ==
Litscher received a bachelor's degree in elementary education from the University of Wisconsin–Whitewater in 1966, a master's degree in educational administration from the University of Wisconsin–Milwaukee in 1970, and a specialist certificate in educational administration from the University of Wisconsin–Milwaukee in 1976.

Litscher worked as an elementary school teacher, elementary school principal, and school district superintendent. Litscher's first political appointment was to serve as Executive Secretary of the Higher Educational Aids Board from 1987 to 1990. From 1991 to 1999, Litscher served as the Wisconsin Secretary of the Department of Employment Relations, and from 1999 until his first retirement in 2003, Litscher served his first term as the Secretary of the Department of Corrections. Litscher served in local government as the City Council President in Beaver Dam, Wisconsin. As City Council President, Litscher helped the Beaver Dam Senior Center earn national accreditation.

Litscher was reappointed to serve as Secretary of the Wisconsin Department of Corrections in February 2016, after the sudden resignation of then-secretary Ed Wall. His confirmation hearing before the Senate Judiciary Committee was held on March 2. Upon his reappointment and amid widespread allegations of abuse at the Lincoln Hills juvenile corrections facility, Litscher pledged to restore trust between the agency and the public. Litscher has been an outspoken advocate for restorative practices and prevention programs, endorsing the annual More Kids Drug Free campaign.

As head of the Department of Corrections, Litscher oversaw more than 10,000 employees throughout the state of Wisconsin. Under Litscher, the Department of Corrections put focus on reforming youth correctional facilities. Reforms included increasing physical and mental health staffing, improving training and compensation for youth counselors, requiring the use of body cameras to document youth counselor interactions, and revising accountability procedures.

Government offices
Preceded by Constance Beck	Secretary of the Wisconsin Department of Employment Relations; January 7, 1991 – January 8, 1999	Succeeded by Peter Fox
Preceded by Michael J. Sullivan	Secretary of the Wisconsin Department of Corrections; January 8, 1999 – January 3, 2003	Succeeded by Matthew J. Frank
Preceded by Ed Wall	Secretary of the Wisconsin Department of Corrections; March 15, 2016 – June 11, 2018	Succeeded by Cathy Jess
