= Dodge Correctional Institution =

Maximum security prison in Wisconsin

Coordinates: 43°37′47″N 88°43′54″W

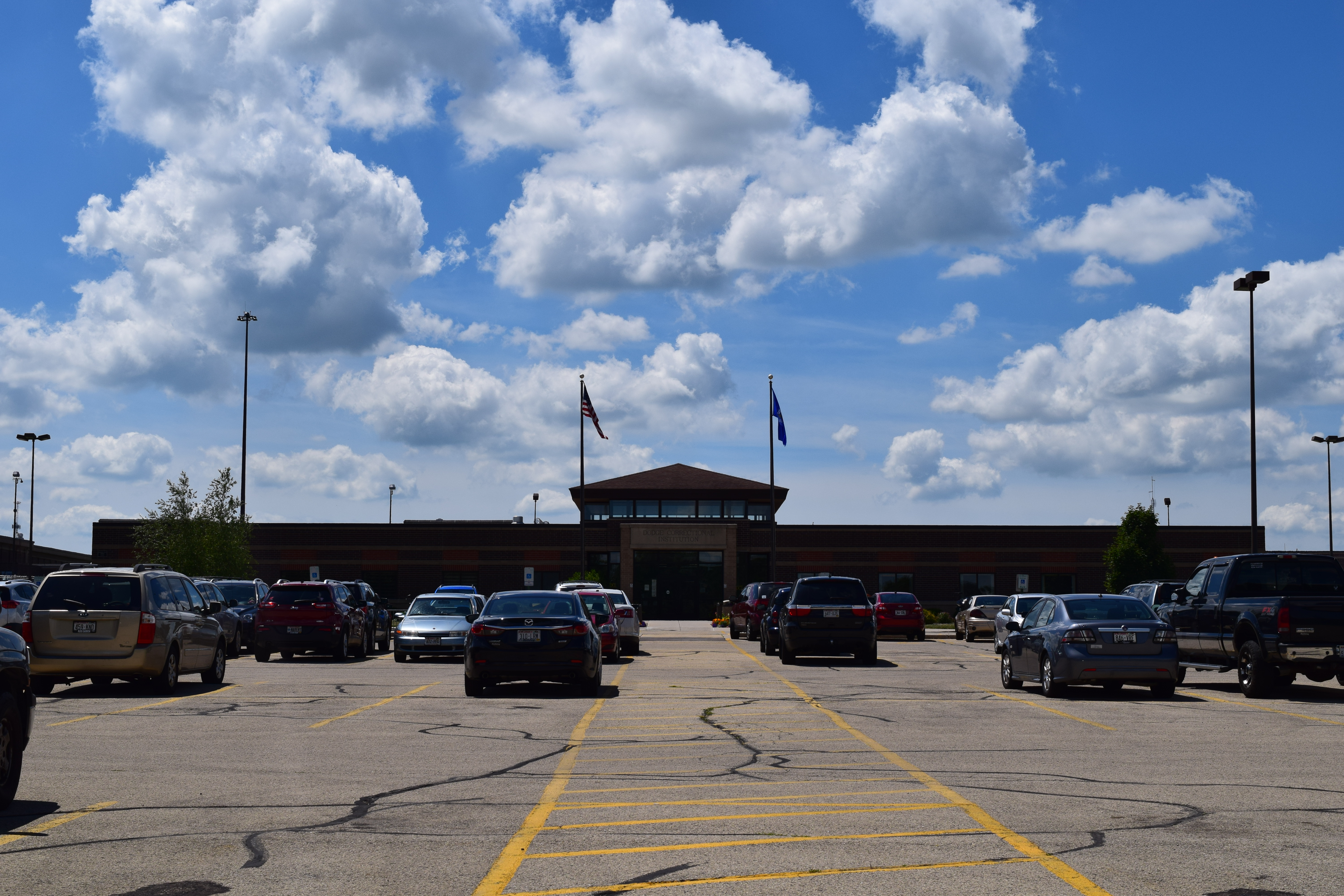
- Entrance to the facility
- Interactive map of Dodge Correctional Institution
- Location: Waupun, Wisconsin, US
- Status: Operational
- Security class: Maximum
- Capacity: 1,165 males (operating)
- Population: 1,597 males (FY 2023)
- Opened: 1978
- Former name: Central State Hospital for the Criminally Insane
- Managed by: Wisconsin Department of Corrections; Division of Adult Institutions
- Warden: Jason Benzel

Dodge Correctional Institution (DCI) is an adult male maximum-security correctional facility operated by the Wisconsin Department of Corrections Division of Adult Institutions in Waupun, Wisconsin, US. The facility was converted from the Central State Hospital for the Criminally Insane to an adult correctional facility in 1977 at a cost of $2.47 million of general obligation bonds, as authorized by Chapter 29 of the Laws of 1977. The first two inmates were transferred from the nearby Waupun Correctional Institution to DCI on May 15, 1978. On October 29, 1993, ground was broken for a $45 million expansion which more than doubled the size of the facility. On June 17, 1996, the first female prisoner was admitted to DCI making it the only reception center for both male and female adult felons committed to the Wisconsin Department of Corrections. DCI served as the reception center for both male and female inmates until December 1, 2004, when the female reception center moved to the Taycheedah Correctional Institution. DCI also serves as the central medical center for the division, providing both in-patient and out-patient care for male and female inmates.

== Notable current and former inmates ==
- Jeffrey Dahmer - Longtime serial killer located in Milwaukee, WI spent less than a day of his sentence here on September 3, 1991 before being transferred to Columbia Correctional Institution.
- Steven Avery – convicted murderer, subject of Netflix documentary, Making a Murderer.
- Ed Gein – murderer, grave robber, incarcerated when the institution was Central State Hospital.
- Jake Patterson – murderer and kidnapper, since relocated to a New Mexico prison.
- John Schrank – attempted assassin of Theodore Roosevelt was at Central State Hospital and died there.
- Chai Vang, convicted of murdering six people, later relocated to Iowa State Penitentiary. Died June 10, 2026 while hospitalized.
- Chris Watts – perpetrator of the Watts family murders, relocated from Colorado Department of Corrections.
- Chandler Halderson, convicted of murdering and dismembering his parents.
- Darrell Brooks Jr. – Perpetrator of the Waukesha Christmas parade attack, in which he murdered six people and injured sixty-two others. Relocated to the Wisconsin Secure Program Facility in Boscobel, Wisconsin to continue serving his sentence in February 2024.

== See also ==
- List of Wisconsin state prisons
