= Waukesha Christmas parade attack =

2021 vehicular mass murder in Wisconsin

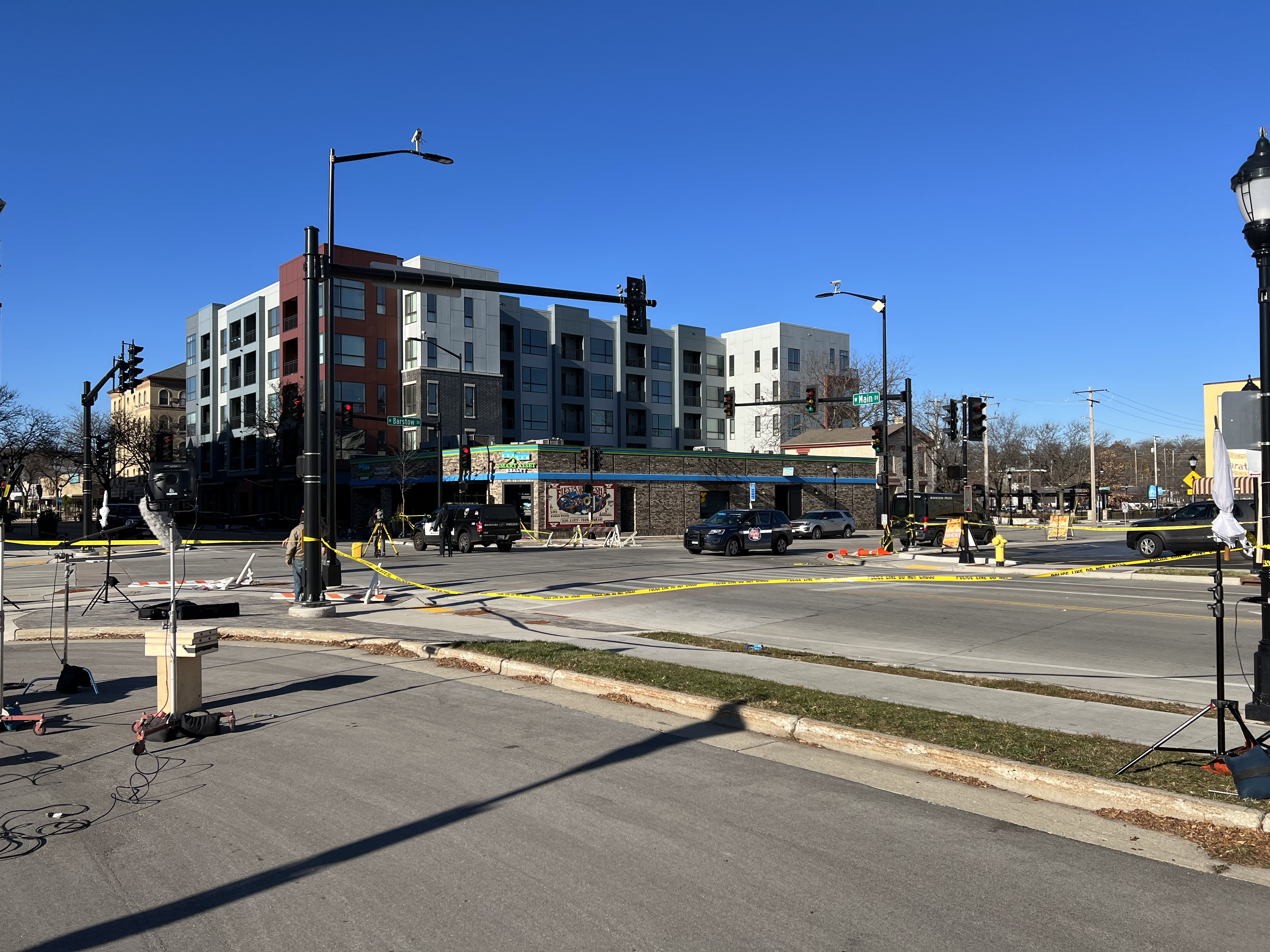
- Site of the incident on the corner of Barstow and Main streets on November 22. Police investigate behind the yellow caution tape.
- Location: 43°00′44″N 88°13′45″W; Waukesha, Wisconsin, U.S.
- Date: November 21, 2021; 4 years ago ~4:39 p.m. (CST)
- Target: People attending or participating in the annual Waukesha Christmas parade
- Attack type: Vehicle-ramming attack, mass murder
- Weapon: 2010 Ford Escape
- Deaths: 6
- Injuries: 62
- Perpetrator: Darrell Brooks
- Motive: Unknown
- Verdict: 6 counts of homicide by intoxicated use of vehicle dismissed pre-trial on defense motion; 1 count of battery dropped by state pre-trial; Guilty on remaining counts
- Convictions: First-degree intentional homicide (6 counts); First-degree recklessly endangering safety (61 counts); Hit and run causing death (6 counts) (Note: Brooks was additionally charged with two counts of bail jumping and two counts of battery (one of which was later dropped) not related to the attack.)
- Sentence: Six consecutive life sentences without the possibility of parole plus 762 1/2 years, and restitution totaling $523,293.01

On November 21, 2021, Darrell Edward Brooks Jr. drove a sport utility vehicle (SUV) through the annual Christmas parade in Waukesha, Wisconsin, United States, killing six people and injuring 62 others. The parade was live-streamed, and other attendees captured the incident on videos later posted to social media.

Brooks, who had been reportedly diagnosed with bipolar disorder as a child, had an extensive criminal record, including several charges of sex crimes and domestic violence. He pleaded not guilty to six counts of first-degree intentional homicide and 70 additional charges. He chose to represent himself at his trial, which began on October 3, 2022. Brooks presented pseudolegal arguments from the sovereign citizen movement and was repeatedly removed from the courtroom for failing to comply with decorum and courtesy. On October 26, 2022, a jury found Brooks guilty on all 76 charges. (Note: Prosecutors withdrew one count of domestic battery.) On November 16, 2022, he was sentenced to six consecutive life sentences without the possibility of parole, plus an additional 762 1/2 years to be served consecutively. In addition, Brooks was ordered to pay over $170,000 in restitution to the victims, though this was later increased to $476,200.

== Background ==
Waukesha, a western suburb of Milwaukee, Wisconsin, hosts an annual Christmas parade downtown. In 2020, the parade was canceled due to the COVID-19 pandemic. The 2021 parade, the 58th annual event, featured more than 60 entries and had the theme "Comfort and Joy".

== Attack ==
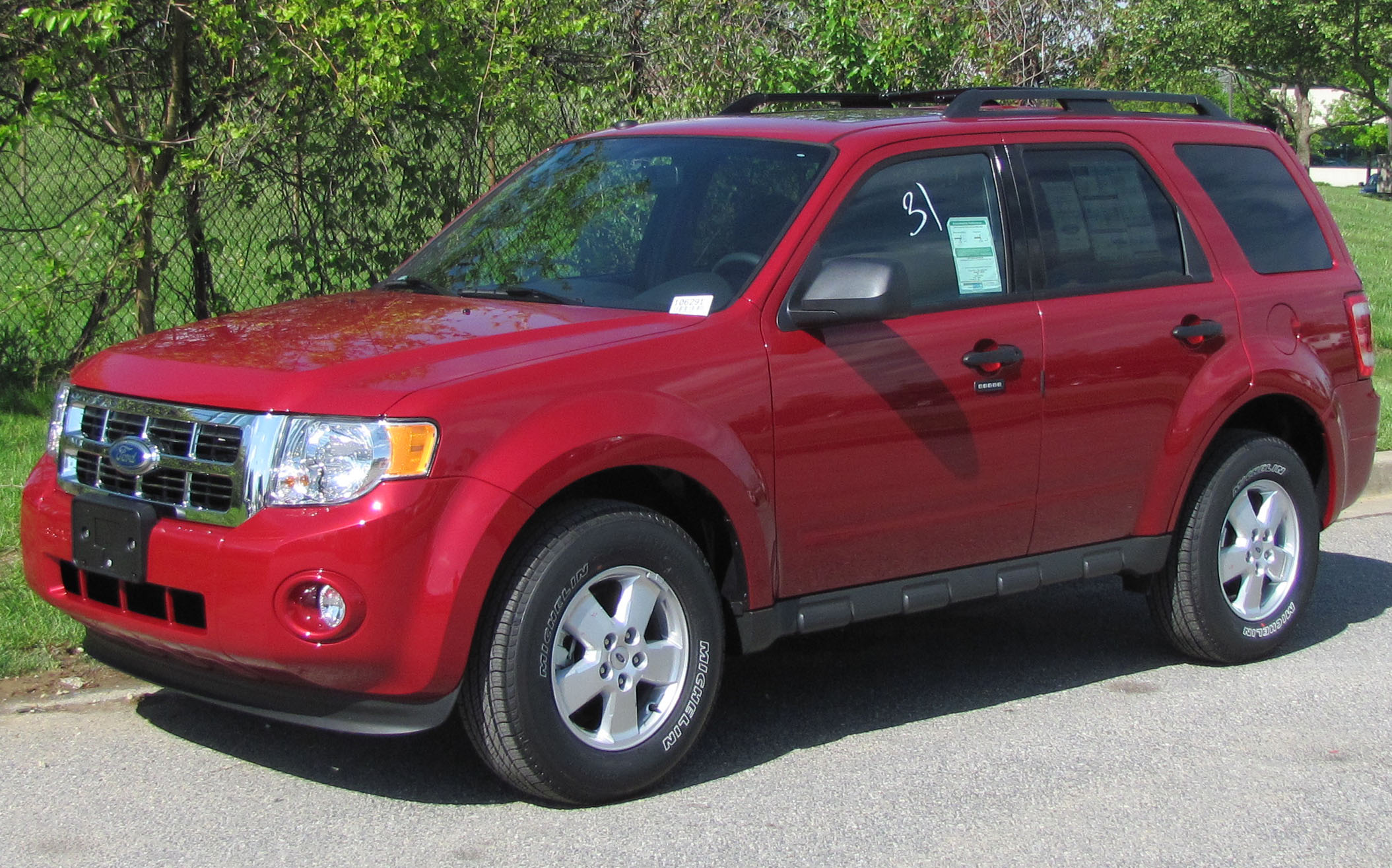
A maroon 2010 Ford Escape similar to the one used in the attack

On November 21, 2021, around 4:39 p.m. (CST), 39-year-old Darrell Brooks drove a red 2010 Ford Escape SUV, moving at about 40 miles per hour (64 km/h), past barricades and through the annual Christmas parade in Waukesha. One police officer banged on the hood of the SUV in an attempt to get Brooks to stop. In the final stage of the rampage, an officer fired his gun in an attempt to stop the vehicle.

The parade was live-streamed, and other attendees captured the incident on videos later posted to social media. Two eyewitnesses told reporters that the driver did not initially stop; all they could hear was people screaming and crying. One witness described the driver as "calm and composed". Police reported that the driver deliberately targeted the crowd, driving in a "zig-zag pattern" to hit as many people as possible.

== Victims ==
During the immediate aftermath of the ramming, five people were confirmed killed and forty-eight others were injured. The five dead were identified as four women and one man. Four of the dead were members of the Milwaukee Dancing Grannies, a dance group composed solely of grandmothers. One member underwent life-saving neurosurgery.

Hospitals admitted twenty-eight people, nine of whom were in critical condition. Seventeen children were among the wounded, with three remaining hospitalized at Children's Wisconsin until early December. By November 23, two days after the incident, the number of people reported injured had increased to sixty-two and the number of fatalities had increased to six after an 8-year-old child died at a hospital. The ages of the dead ranged from 8 to 81.

== Aftermath ==
The Waukesha Police Department issued a shelter-in-place order for parts of Waukesha but withdrew it the same evening. The Waukesha School District canceled school on November 22 and November 23 and made additional counselors available to students. On November 22, vigils were held across the city. A week after the attacks the city of Waukesha held a moment of silence. Children's Wisconsin opened a crisis hotline for those seeking emotional and psychological support. First Lady Jill Biden met privately with victims' family members and attended a memorial to the victims on December 15.

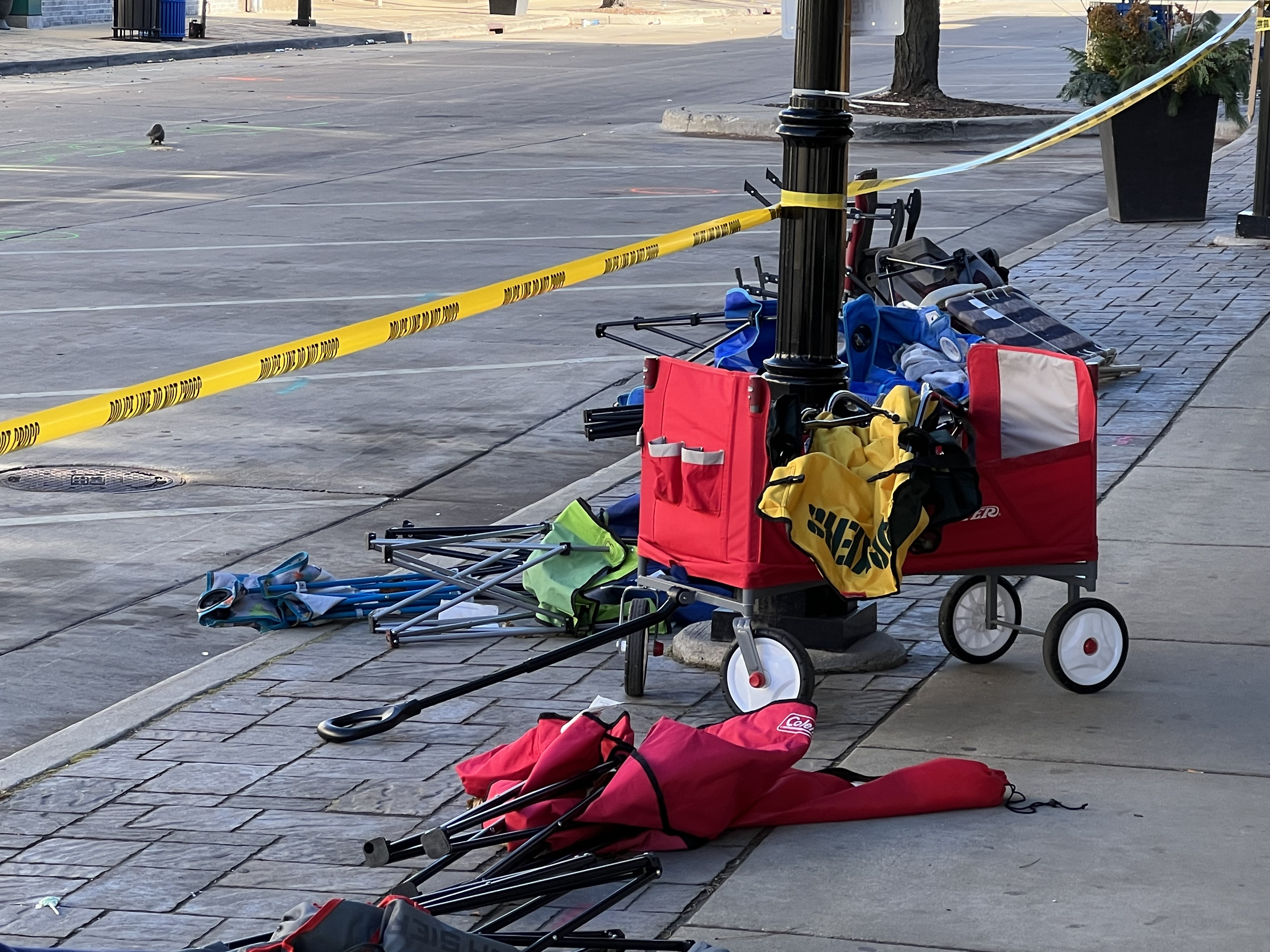
Abandoned items from parade goers on the corner of Broadway and Main St

Several donation efforts were made, with nearly $900,000 having been raised on GoFundMe for victims of the attack, and 7,000 donations being made raising over $1.8 million to the United for Waukesha Community Fund. In addition, local contractors volunteered to install wheelchair ramps in the homes of those injured from the attack who would need wheelchairs.

In March 2022, the United for Waukesha Community Fund announced that they had raised more than $6.2 million for the victims of the attack.

== Perpetrator ==
Darrell Brooks
- Brooks during a police interrogation, the day after the attack
- Born: Darrell Edward Brooks Jr. February 21, 1982 (age 44); Milwaukee, Wisconsin, U.S.
- Known for: Perpetrator of the Waukesha Christmas parade attack
- Status: Incarcerated
- Convictions: First-degree intentional homicide (6 counts); First-degree recklessly endangering safety (61 counts); Hit and run causing death (6 counts) (Note: Brooks was additionally charged with two counts of bail jumping and two counts of battery (one of which was later dropped) not related to the attack.)
- Penalty: Six back-to-back life sentences without the possibility of parole plus 762 1/2 years

Details
- Date: November 21, 2021 ~4:39 P.M. (CST)
- Locations: Waukesha, Wisconsin, U.S.
- Target: People attending the annual Waukesha Christmas parade
- Killed: 6
- Injured: 61–62
- Weapon: 2010 Ford Escape
- Imprisoned at: South Dakota State Penitentiary (Note: Brooks was imprisoned at the Dodge Correctional Institution in Waupun, Wisconsin until February 7, 2024, when he was transferred to the Wisconsin Secure Program Facility in Boscobel, Wisconsin, U.S. In January 2025, he was transferred to an unknown location out of state.)

On the day of the attack, police recovered a damaged Ford Escape and arrested Darrell Edward Brooks Jr., who was 39 at the time. Born and raised in Milwaukee, Brooks already had an extensive criminal record dating back to September 1999. According to police records, a note revealed that Brooks was raised in Milwaukee without a father, but he had a supportive mother. His grandmother wrote a letter to the court stating that Brooks was diagnosed with bipolar disorder at the age of 12, following a psychiatric hospitalization in 1994. Brooks did not complete his high school education, having been charged with his first felony on September 5, 1999, for substantial battery while he was still a high school junior. He was sentenced to two years in jail, three years of probation, and six months at Milwaukee County Community Reintegration Center in nearby Franklin.

Brooks was arrested on the night of the attack, soon after he told a Waukesha resident that he was homeless and asked to use his phone to call an Uber. The man was unaware of the events that had occurred and permitted Brooks briefly inside his home, giving him a sandwich and letting him borrow a jacket, but asked him to leave when police arrived. Brooks left the man's home and surrendered to police without incident.

It is believed Brooks acted alone and did not know anyone at the parade. Police investigated whether he was fleeing from a nearby domestic disturbance when encountering the parade. The police chief said, "We have information that the suspect prior to the incident was involved in a domestic disturbance, which was just minutes prior, and the suspect left that scene just prior to our arrival to that domestic disturbance." He also said that Brooks was not being chased by police when he drove into the parade route. Prosecutors alleged that Brooks was trying to "strike and hurt as many people as possible".

=== Criminal history ===
Brooks faced criminal charges in Manitowoc in 2005. Following this, in November 2006, he was convicted of a felony statutory sexual seduction after impregnating a 15-year-old girl in Sparks, Nevada. He pleaded guilty in March 2007 and was sentenced to 12–36 months at the Northern Nevada Correctional Center in Carson City. He was released in September 2008. Brooks then had subsequent criminal charges in Wisconsin Rapids in 2010. In 2016, he was made subject to a warrant for another statutory sex crime in Sparks, Nevada. This warrant remained outstanding at the time of the November 2021 attack. Brooks has been registered for life as a sex offender in Wisconsin since 2020.

On July 24, 2020, in Arlington Heights, Milwaukee, Brooks was charged with second-degree recklessly endangering safety and being a felon in possession of a firearm after allegedly shooting at his nephew and a friend over a cell phone dispute near a house on North 19th Street. He was held pending trial and did not post bail of $10,000; however, the trial was delayed, and he was released on a reduced $500 bond on February 9, 2021.

Six months and one week prior to the Waukesha attack, Brooks was arrested in relation to domestic violence while staying at the Country Hearth Inn in Union City, Georgia. A witness told police that he was staying in the adjacent room when he overheard Brooks arguing with and attacking his ex-girlfriend, causing the witness to confront Brooks. According to WXIA-TV, Brooks brandished a firearm in front of his ex-girlfriend during the argument. After spending the rest of the day being held at the East Point Law Enforcement Center in East Point, Brooks appeared in court the following day on May 28. He received a signature bond but never made it to its signature court date.

On November 2, 2021, three weeks prior to the Waukesha attack, Brooks punched his ex-girlfriend before running her over with his vehicle. The subsequent charges filed against him included second-degree recklessly endangering safety with domestic abuse assessments (a felony), as well as disorderly conduct with domestic abuse assessments. Brooks posted $1000 bail on November 19, two days before the Waukesha attack, and was released the same day. He was not convicted of these charges until September 5, 2024, after which he was sentenced to an additional 9 years in prison.

== Legal proceedings ==
=== Pre-trial proceedings ===
Brooks was initially charged with five counts of first-degree intentional homicide. Following the death of a sixth victim, Brooks's bond was set at $5 million, and he remained in custody, following an initial court appearance. The Waukesha County District Attorney said more charges were likely to come and charged Brooks with a sixth count of first-degree intentional homicide on November 29.

Brooks was interviewed by Fox News while he was in custody, and he said, "I just feel like I'm being monster—demonized." His mother wrote a letter to the media saying Brooks had a long history of mental health problems and no health insurance to pay for treatment. In December, Brooks was charged further for the November 21 incident, with charges of intimidating a witness and intimidation of a victim, both felonies. He is alleged to have called his girlfriend from jail over several days and threatened her to prevent her cooperation with the investigation.

In January 2022, 77 additional charges were filed against Brooks for the parade attack, including 61 counts of first-degree recklessly endangering safety with a dangerous weapon, six counts of hit and run involving death, two counts of felony bail jumping, and two counts of domestic abuse, bringing the total amount of charges to 85. The latter charges are in relation to two altercations between Brooks and his girlfriend on the day of the attack and the day before.

=== Trial and sentencing ===
On January 14, 2022, Waukesha Court Commissioner Kevin Costello ruled in preliminary hearing that Brooks would stand trial due to "ample evidence on all fronts". Waukesha police detective Thomas Casey testified in the hearing as a witness, saying that he and other officers at the scene yelled at Brooks to stop. At the same time, Brooks zigzagged with his vehicle for blocks to strike pedestrians. Brooks's defense attorney Anna Kees argued that Brooks was high during the incident, noting that the police officers who arrested him noticed that Brooks smelled of cannabis and had red glassy eyes. Kees also claimed that Brooks did not intend to kill anyone, as he "couldn't bring himself" to look at photos of the victims. District Attorney Susan Opper counter-argued that all that Brooks had to do was stop, and that even if he was intoxicated, he still committed multiple crimes.

On February 11, 2022, Brooks pleaded not guilty to all charges. Defense attorney Jeremy Perri entered two motions, requesting in the first one for a different trial in a different county, claiming that Brooks was unlikely to receive a fair and impartial jury trial in grief-stricken Waukesha, citing the "ubiquitous" Waukesha Strong solidarity movement within the county. The second motion requested a new judge for the case, for which no reason was given. Court Commissioner Costello denied the first motion but granted the second motion, reassigning the case from Judge Michael Bohren to Chief Judge Jennifer Dorow. One month later, Dorow scheduled Brooks's trial for October 3, 2022, at the Waukesha County Circuit Court. Before jury selection, one count of domestic battery was dropped by the prosecutors.

In a pre-trial hearing, Brooks requested self-representation. Dorow considered the request and ruled that Brooks could proceed pro se. During proceedings, Brooks used arguments from the sovereign citizen movement, a pseudolegal movement whose adherents claim that courts do not have jurisdiction over them. Brooks declared himself to be "sovereign", stated that he did not consent to being recognized by his name, asked if the court was "a common law court or an admiralty law court", and argued that since the state of Wisconsin was an entity rather than a person, it could not file a claim against him. These arguments had not succeeded before in criminal trials; Dorow ruled that Brooks was not allowed to argue that he was a sovereign citizen in court, stating that the defense was without merit.

During his trial, Brooks was repeatedly removed from the courtroom after failing to comply with decorum under Illinois v. Allen; some of these instances included Brooks engaging in numerous interruptions, backtalking, glaring, and other outbursts toward Dorow. On October 24, 2022, Brooks was given the chance to offer the defense; however, due to Brooks's repeated misbehavior and failing to follow decorum, Dorow ruled that he had forfeited his right to call further witnesses (which would have included his mother) and declared the evidentiary stage of the trial over. Closing arguments were made on October 25, after which jury deliberations began that same day. The prosecution argued there was "overwhelming evidence" Brooks had intentionally rammed his SUV into the crowd. Brooks gave a tearful closing argument, implying that his vehicle may have malfunctioned.

Before giving his closing argument, Brooks asked Dorow if she had instructed the jury on jury nullification. Dorow sent the jury away so that she could warn Brooks, outside their presence, that he was not allowed to make that argument. Dorow cited case law, which held that jury nullification was not a proper argument and that she had the power to shut down any argument that went outside the bounds of the law. Brooks engaged in a lengthy debate with the judge, during which he insisted that he be allowed to "inform the jury of the truth". Dorow maintained her position and warned Brooks that if he persisted in raising the issue of jury nullification, he would forfeit his right to give a closing argument. Eventually, the prosecution suggested that rather than immediately revoking his right to a closing argument, Brooks would be allowed to make his closing argument, and the prosecution would handle any improper arguments through objection. The judge agreed. Within the first minute of his closing argument, Brooks argued for jury nullification. The prosecution swiftly objected, and the jury was told to disregard the argument.

On October 26, the jury returned with guilty verdicts on all 76 counts, after deliberating for a total of three hours and fifteen minutes.

Brooks was sentenced on November 16, 2022. Dorow imposed six life sentences without the possibility of parole, one for each of the deceased victims, to be served consecutively. For the 61 counts of reckless endangerment, she sentenced Brooks to a total of 762 1/2 years of initial confinement and 305 years of extended supervision. For the six counts of hit-and-run, he received 150 years to run concurrently with the reckless endangerment sentences. People attending the trial applauded when Dorow announced the sentence.

=== Post-sentencing and incarceration ===
After conviction and sentencing, Brooks filed for an appeal. He filed a motion for a stay of judgment pending appeal. He was placed on a suicide prevention protocol. Upon his November 2022 conviction, he was submitted for incarceration at Waupun's Dodge Correctional Institution; Between March 2024 and January 2025, he was incarcerated at the Wisconsin Secure Program Facility, a supermax prison located in Boscobel.

== Responses and reactions ==
Wisconsin Governor Tony Evers expressed gratitude for the efforts of first responders and good Samaritans, and voiced support for affected families and community members. Evers ordered the United States and Wisconsin flags to be flown at half-staff the day after the incident in honor of the victims.

U.S. President Joe Biden condemned the attack, calling it a "horrific act of violence".

Wisconsin senators Tammy Baldwin and Ron Johnson released a joint statement, asking people to avoid using the event for political purposes.

Pope Francis sent prayers and condolences to the victims on a message signed on his behalf.

Waukesha County Executive Paul Farrow posted on social media and stated: "Please pray for our community tonight after the horrific events at the Waukesha Christmas Parade."

The attack triggered a backlash against bail reform. Brooks was released on $1,000 bail two days before the attack when he was arrested for running over his former girlfriend with his vehicle during an altercation, and the attack came at a time when the COVID-19 pandemic had resulted in courts wanting to reduce jail crowding to reduce risk of infection by giving lower bail requests. The bail, however, was not a result of any systemic changes to Waukesha's pretrial system; the office of the Milwaukee District Attorney John T. Chisholm, which set his bail, said in a statement that "the State's bail recommendation in this case was inappropriately low in light of the nature of the recent charges and the pending charges against Mr. Brooks", and said that bail was a result of "human error" of an overworked assistant district attorney. A court commissioner who was also involved in setting the bail was indefinitely reassigned to non-criminal cases.

Brooks' Facebook account contained anti-white, anti-semitic and conspiratorial viewpoints. After the attack, the Anti-Defamation League reported that Brooks' hateful social media posts were exploited by white supremacists in order to push racist and anti-semitic conspiracy theories, claiming that Brooks' crime was racially motivated, that he killed his victims specifically because he hated white people, and that both Jews and liberal media were attempting to cover up the incident. Law enforcement did not give a motive for the attack, and there is no evidence that Brooks belonged to any organized group.

== See also ==
- 2016 Berlin truck attack, vehicle-ramming attack at a Christmas market in Berlin, Germany
- 2024 Magdeburg car attack, vehicle-ramming attack at a Christmas market in Magdeburg, Germany
- Highland Park parade shooting (2022), a similar attack which targeted a holiday-themed parade
- List of people sentenced to more than one life imprisonment
