= Wisconsin Secure Program Facility =

Male prison in Boscobel, Wisconsin, United States

Coordinates: 43°08′35″N 90°40′59″W

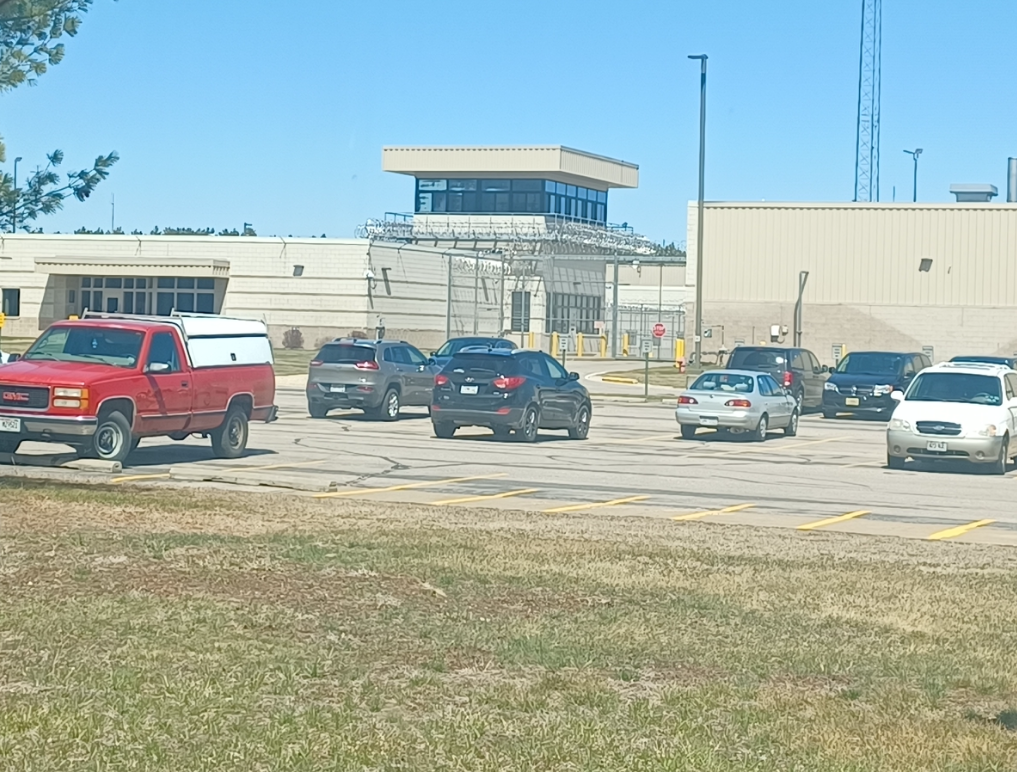
- WSPF photographed from Morrison Street in April 2022
- Interactive map of Wisconsin Secure Program Facility
- Location: 1101 Morrison Drive Boscobel, Wisconsin
- Status: Open
- Security class: Maximum
- Capacity: 500
- Population: 372
- Opened: November 1999
- Managed by: Wisconsin Department of Corrections
- Warden: Gary Boughton

The Wisconsin Secure Program Facility (WSPF), originally the Supermax Correctional Institution, is a Wisconsin Department of Corrections prison for men, located in Boscobel, Wisconsin, US. The facility is located east of central Boscobel, off of Wisconsin Highway 133.

The prison has a capacity of 500. As of November 2022, the population is 372.

== History ==
In November 1999, the WSPF opened as the Supermax Correctional Institution on a 24-acre (9.7 ha) site.

In October 2003, the prison was renamed to the Wisconsin Secure Program Facility.

In 2009, the Associated Press filed a lawsuit against the Wisconsin Department of Corrections (WIDOC), trying to force the agency to release a video of an explosion of a stinger grenade launched into a prisoner's cell. The video was eventually released, the AP was awarded legal fees, and the inmate settled an excessive force lawsuit with WIDOC for US$49,000 (equivalent to $73,534 in 2025).

== Notable inmates ==
- Christopher Scarver (1999–2001; now at Centennial Correctional Facility in Colorado)
- Eric Hainstock, perpetrator of the 2006 Weston High School shooting
- Darrell E. Brooks Jr., perpetrator of the 2021 Waukesha parade attack

== See also ==
- List of Wisconsin state prisons
