= Winnebago, Wisconsin =

- Unincorporated community
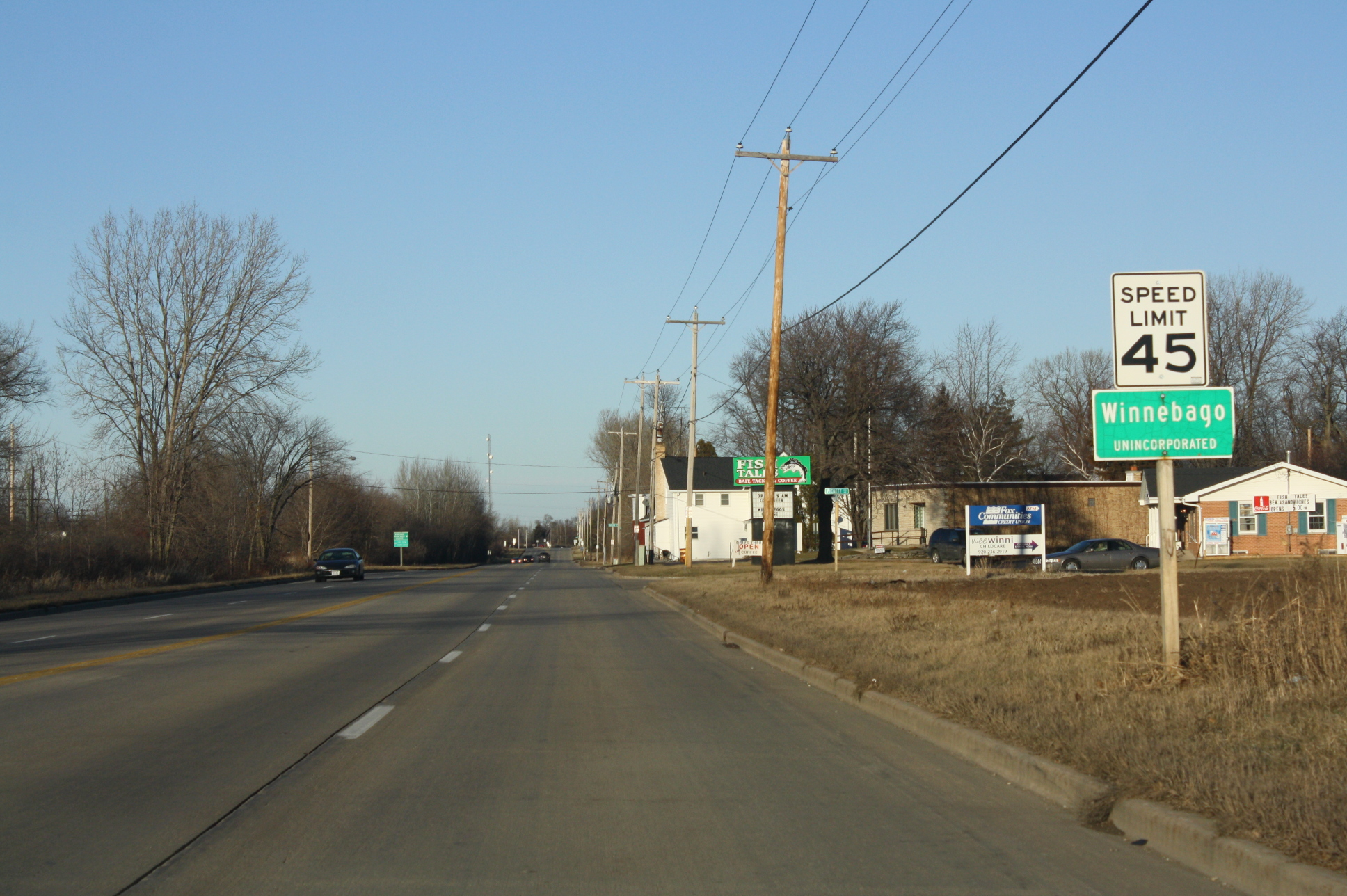
- Looking north at Winnebago's sign

- Location within Wisconsin Location within the United States
- Country: United States
- State: Wisconsin
- County: Winnebago
- Elevation: 771 ft (235 m)
- Time zone: UTC-6 (Central (CST))
  - Summer (DST): UTC-5 (CDT)
- ZIP Code: 54985
- Area code: 920
- GNIS feature ID: 1577889

Winnebago is an unincorporated community in the Town of Oshkosh in Winnebago County, Wisconsin, United States, and is part of the Oshkosh metropolitan statistical area. It is located just outside the northeast edge of the city of Oshkosh. The Winnebago Mental Health Institute is located in Winnebago. The ZIP code is: 54985. U.S. Route 45 ran through the community until the road's route was moved west; the former route is now occupied by County Highway A.

== 2017 water issues ==
The community residents began receiving water and sewer utilities from the Winnebago Health Institute in the 1940s. In April 2017, 24 community residents received a letter from the state of Wisconsin stating that it would be shutting off their water and sewer on August 1, 2017. The institute receives water from the City of Oshkosh, which annexed the institute in 1998; the institute had sent letters to the town and city asking for them to come up with a solution.

== Notable people ==
- Gene Englund, basketball player

== Images ==
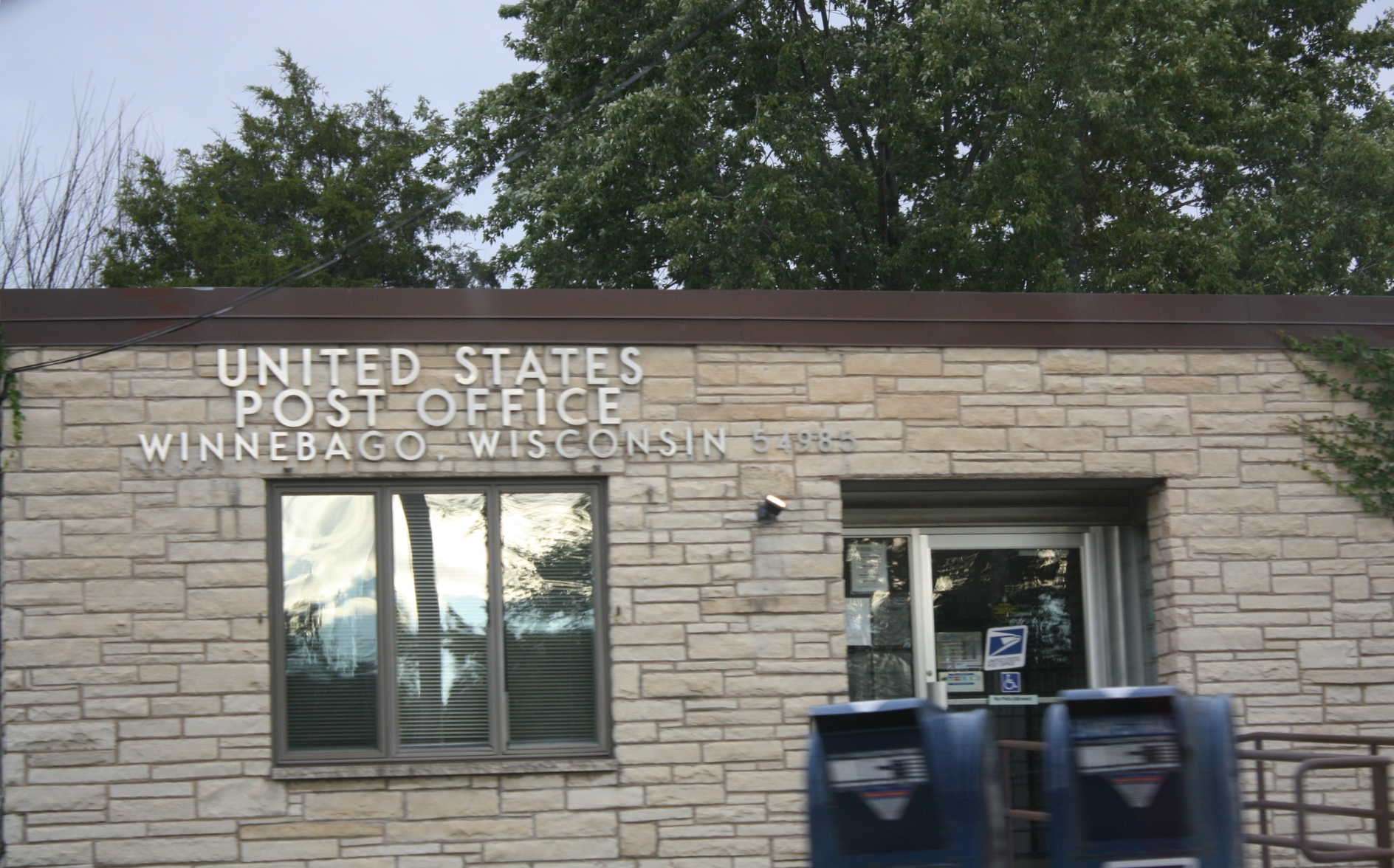
Post office

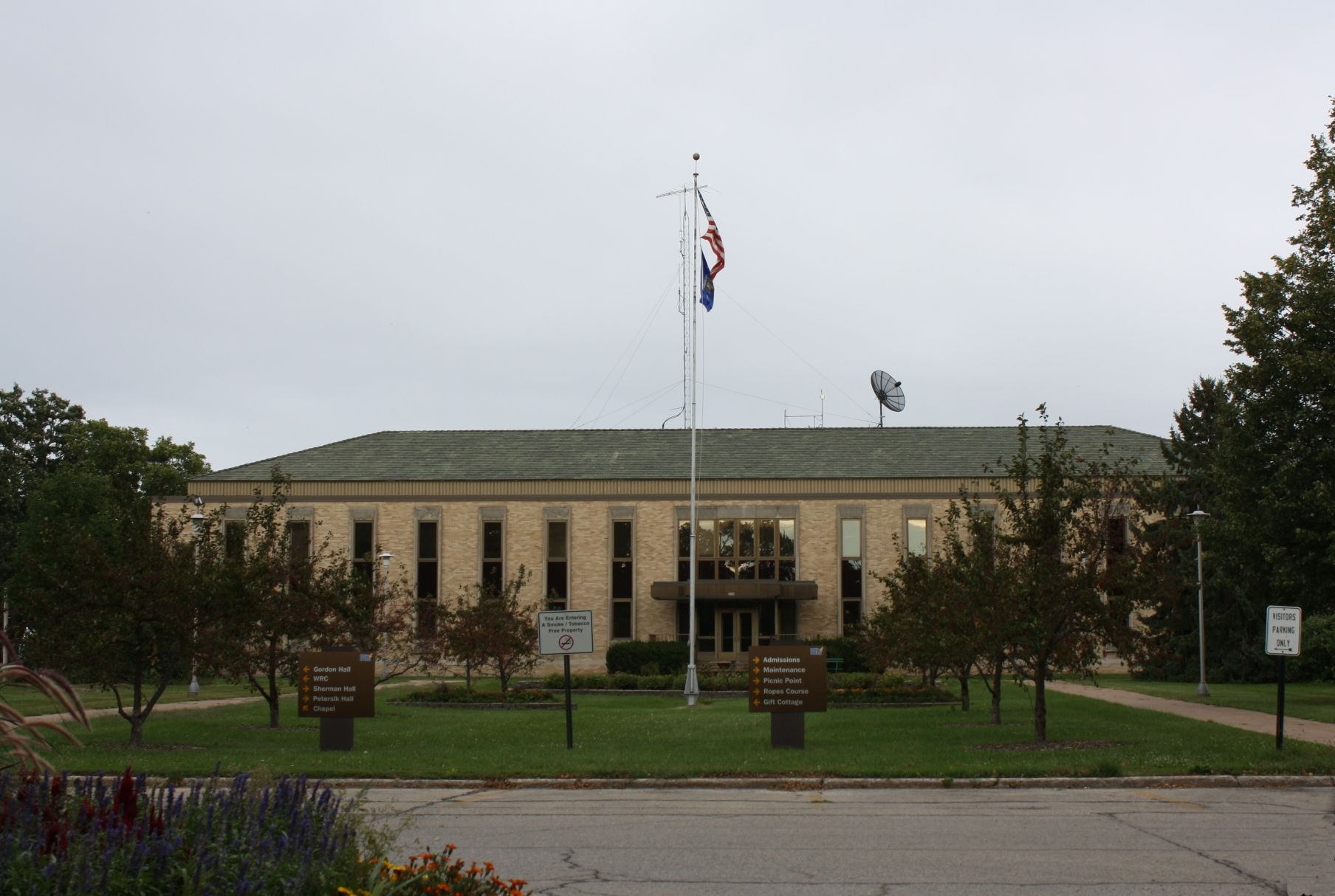
Winnebago Mental Health Institute
