= Wisconsin Department of Employment Relations =

Former Wisconsin state agency

Agency overview
- Formed: February 14, 1978
- Preceding agencies: Wisconsin Civil Service Commission (1905–1929); Wisconsin Bureau of Personnel (1929–1959); Bureau of Personnel, under Wisconsin Department of Administration (1959–1978)
- Dissolved: August 24, 2003
- Superseding agencies: Office of State Employment Relations, under Wisconsin Department of Administration (2003–2015); Division of Personnel Management, under Wisconsin Department of Administration (2015–present)
- Headquarters: 345 W. Washington Ave. Madison, Wisconsin, U.S. 43°4′17.04″N 89°23′16.584″W
- Employees: 78 (2003)
- Annual budget: $14,203,300 (2003)
- Website: Agency website (Archived Feb. 2003)

The Wisconsin Department of Employment Relations was an agency of the Wisconsin state government responsible for all personnel matters in the state government, including civil service qualifications, affirmative action and non-discrimination issues, collective bargaining with state employee unions, and other human resources services.

The department was demoted from a cabinet-level agency in 2003, most of the responsibilities were transferred to the Wisconsin Department of Administration as the Office of State Employment Relations (OSER), which was subsequently converted into the Division of Personnel Management in 2015.

== History ==
The Wisconsin Department of Employment Relations traced its origins back to the creation of the state Civil Service Commission by 1905 Wisconsin Act 363. It was a key piece of Governor Robert M. "Fighting Bob" La Follette's Progressive Era reform agenda. The Civil Service Commission implemented a civil service exam and required that future state government hiring and promotions would be determined by merit, rather than purely at the whims of the governor under the spoils system.

In 1929, the Civil Service Commission was replaced by the Bureau of Personnel, which was created by 1929 Wisconsin Act 465. The Bureau remained independent until 1959, when it was folded into the new Wisconsin Department of Administration, created by 1959 Wisconsin Act 228 as part of Governor Gaylord Nelson's attempts to streamline the state bureaucracy. Later in that same legislative term, they enacted 1959 Wisconsin Act 509, often referred to as the "Public Employee Collective Bargaining Act", which created the right for state employee unions to bargain for benefits and compensation with the state, and entrusted that bargaining power to the Bureau of Personnel. Wisconsin was the first state in the country to allow public employee unions to negotiate with state and local governments.

In 1972, Governor Patrick Lucey issued an executive order creating an affirmative action unit in the Bureau of Personnel, to encourage the hiring and promotion of women and minority candidates. The order also encouraged state agencies to designate an affirmative action officer and develop an affirmative action plan.

The Wisconsin Department of Employment Relations was separated from the Department of Administration and created as an independent cabinet-level department by 1977 Wisconsin Act 196, signed by Governor Martin J. Schreiber on February 15, 1978. The Department took on new responsibilities as part of Tommy Thompson's Wisconsin Works (welfare-to-work) program in the 1990s.

In 2003, new governor Jim Doyle proposed eliminating the department as part of a budget-cutting proposal. The department was formally eliminated in the state's 2003 budget, and the department ceased to exist on August 24, 2003. Most functions were transferred to the new Office of State Employment Relations (OSER) in the Wisconsin Department of Administration. The final secretary of the Department of Employment Relations was named the director of OSER.

The Office's mission was radically changed by administration of Governor Scott Walker, whose signature law, 2011 Wisconsin Act 10, ended collective bargaining rights for state employees and forbid the state government from negotiating union contracts with public employee unions. In 2015, the Office of State Employment Relations was replaced by the Division of Personnel Management. Then in 2016, Walker further amended state civil service rules, signing into law a bill to eliminate the state civil service exam.

== Organization ==
=== Leadership ===
The department was led by a secretary, appointed by the governor with the advice and consent of the Wisconsin Senate. The secretary was empowered to hire and fire the administrators of the Division of Affirmative Action and the Division of Compensation and Labor Relations, at their own discretion. The administrator of the Division of Merit Recruitment and Selection required a merit-based process, and would be appointed by the governor with Senate confirmation, and would then have a guaranteed five-year term.

=== Divisions ===
==== Administrative Services ====
The Division of Administrative Services managed internal department operations, including spending, accounting, information technology, personnel, payroll, procurement, planning, analysis, and preparation of the budget.

==== Affirmative Action ====
The Division of Affirmative Action administered the state's equal employment opportunity and affirmative action program, and reported annually on state progress toward affirmative action goals. It set standards for state executive agencies, for the University of Wisconsin System, and for legislative service agencies, and provided technical assistance to agencies to develop and implement affirmative action plans, train supervisors on equal opportunity practices, and monitor agency programs. The division also provided staff for the state Council on Affirmative Action.

==== Compensation and Labor Relations ====
The Division of Compensation and Labor Relations was responsible for developing the state employee compensation plan and policies, and ensuring state compliance with federal state and family medical leave policies. The division was also responsible for representing the state as an employer in negotiations with state labor unions, although the Legislature still had final power to ratify or reject labor contracts. They also represented the state in arbitration proceedings, conducted labor relations training programs for state employees in supervisory positions, and coordinated the state's Labor-Management Cooperation Program.

==== Merit Recruitment and Selection ====
The Division of Merit Recruitment and Selection was responsible for hiring most state employees, referred to as the "classified" employees—those classified as requiring civil service merit-based hiring processes. It was empowered to establish policies to ensure fair competition for civil service positions and to ensure the hiring of a qualified and diverse workforce, and to develop and administer the state's job classifications and pay ranges. To support their mission, they were tasked with developing and administering the state's civil service examinations and assessments, then provided lists of qualified candidates to the agencies for their selection. The division was also tasked with administering the state's performance evaluation program, administering layoffs and other employee status changes, investigating potential violations of civil service rules, administering the state code of ethics for classified employees, and training state agencies. The division also supported the Wisconsin City County Services program, which provided personnel support services to local government agencies for a fee, and assisted state agencies in complying with protective occupation determinations and the federal Fair Labor Standards Act. They also became responsible for the State Employment Options Program as part of the Wisconsin Works (welfare-to-work) program, to help welfare or food stamp recipients in obtaining state employment.

== Secretaries ==
Order	Secretary	Took office	Left office	Governor	Notes
1	Linda Reivitz	1978	1979	Martin J. Schreiber	
2	Hugh Henderson Jr.	1979	1983	Lee S. Dreyfus	
3	Howard Fuller	1983	1986	Tony Earl	
-	Peggy Howard Moore	1986	1987	Tony Earl	Acting secretary.
4	John M. Tries	1987	1988	Tommy Thompson	
5	Constance P. Beck	1988	1991	Tommy Thompson	
6	Jon E. Litscher	1991	1999	Tommy Thompson	
7	Peter D. Fox	1999	2003	Tommy Thompson	
8	Karen E. Timberlake	2003	2003	Jim Doyle	Last secretary.
