= Wisconsin Department of Corrections =

Wisconsin state government department

- Seal of the Wisconsin Department of Corrections
- Abbreviation: WIDOC

Agency overview
- Formed: January 1, 1990
- Preceding agencies: Wisconsin Prison Commissioner (1853–1874); Wisconsin Prison Commission (1874–1881); Wisconsin Board of Supervision of Charitable, Reformatory and Penal Institutions (1881–1891); Wisconsin Board of Control of Reformatory, Charitable, and Penal Institutions (1891–1939); Division of Corrections, Wisconsin Department of Public Welfare (1939–1967); Division of Corrections, Wisconsin Department of Health and Social Services (1967–1989)
- Employees: 10,261.52 (2023)
- Annual budget: $2,838,410,000 (2023)

Jurisdictional structure
- Operations jurisdiction: Wisconsin, USA

Operational structure
- Headquarters: 3099 E. Washington Ave. Madison, Wisconsin
- Agency executive: Jared M. Hoy, Secretary

Facilities
- Institutions: 41

Website
- doc.wi.gov

The Wisconsin Department of Corrections (WIDOC) is an administrative department in the executive branch of the state of Wisconsin responsible for corrections in Wisconsin, including state prisons and community supervision. The secretary is a cabinet member appointed by the governor of Wisconsin and confirmed by the Wisconsin Senate.

Divisions of the Wisconsin Department of Corrections include: the Division of Juvenile Corrections (DJC), the Division of Adult Institutions (DAI), the Division of Community Corrections (DCC) and Division of Management Services (DMS). WIDOC is headquartered in Madison.

== History ==
The Wisconsin Legislature first authorized a commission to locate and build a state prison in 1851. That first prison was opened in 1852 in Waupun, Wisconsin. In 1853, Wisconsin abolished the death penalty, making it the first state to do so. That same year, Wisconsin created the office of state prison commissioner as a state-wide partisan elected office. That office was abolished in 1874 and replaced by a board of commissioners appointed by the governor, which was folded into the state Board of Supervision of Charitable, Reformatory and Penal Institutions in 1881. That board was transformed into the Board of Control of Reformatory, Charitable, and Penal Institutions in 1891.

In 1909, a law was enacted creating parole and the state's first Parole officer was appointed. In 1933, Taycheedah Correctional Institution opened as an all female prison.

In 1939, control of state prisons was transferred to a new "Division of Corrections" established within the new Wisconsin Department of Public Welfare. There was a major reorganization of Wisconsin's state government agencies in 1967, and the Department of Public Welfare was replaced by the Wisconsin Department of Health and Social Services, where the Division of Corrections was relocated. The modern Wisconsin Department of Corrections was created by a chapter of the executive budget of 1989 (1989 Wisc. Act 31) and began operating January 1, 1990.

In April 2020, the American Civil Liberties Union filed a lawsuit asking the Wisconsin Supreme Court to order Governor Tony Evers and the Department of Corrections to reduce the prison population due to COVID-19.

== Division of Adult Institutions ==
The Division of Adult Institutions (DAI) oversees 19 adult institutions and 16 adult correctional centers, along with the Office of Program Services, the Bureau of Correctional Enterprises, the Bureau of Health Services and the Bureau of Offender Classification and Movement. The Wisconsin Correctional Center System consists of 14 adult male facilities statewide that assist inmates in reintegration to the community. The Wisconsin Women's Correctional System includes Taycheedah Correctional Institution and two adult female correctional centers.

Male inmates entering the prison system first go to Dodge Correctional Institution before being given permanent assignments, and female inmates to Taycheedah Correctional Institution.

== Division of Juvenile Corrections ==
The Division of Juvenile Corrections operates three juvenile facilities and several regional offices in the Northwest and Southeast.

Secured juvenile correctional facilities include:

- Lincoln Hills School and Copper Lake School are located in Irma, WI.
- The Grow Academy is a residential program offering comprehensive treatment for county and state-supervised youth as an alternative to incarceration, as well as a step down for youth returning to the community.

The state also uses residential care centers and works with the Department of Health Services in relation to the Mendota Juvenile Treatment Center (MJTC).

Facilities that are now closed include:

- Ethan Allen School for Boys (Delafield Town) - Closed on July 1, 2011.
  - Facility was converted from the Wisconsin State TB Sanitarium to a juvenile facility in April 1959.
- Southern Oaks Girls School - Closed on July 1, 2011.

== Division of Community Corrections ==
The function of the Division of Community Corrections (DCC) is to supervise offenders (more than 68,000 as of 2017) on probation, parole or extended supervision, which includes the operation and maintenance of the Wisconsin sex offender registry program. These offenders are supervised by Probation and Parole Agents who use evidence based-practices to enhance public safety by addressing their offender's most influential criminogenic needs to lower their level of recidivism and assist them in building skills needed to be successful in the community. Agents provide investigative services to the courts and the Parole Commission to aid in sentencing and community reentry planning.

== Division of Management Services ==
The Division of Management Services (DMS) provides analytical and operational services that support all Department of Corrections' policies, programs, and service delivery initiatives. The Division serves as a resource in the areas of training, risk management and safety, fleet management, budgeting, internal auditing, accounting, fiscal services, food services, purchasing and procurement, facilities management, telecommunications, general support services, information systems, technology management, and records management.

== Facilities ==
The Wisconsin Department of Corrections operates 20 prisons.

== Historical leadership ==
=== State Prison Commissioners (1853–1874) ===
Order	Commissioner	Took office	Left office	Notes
1	John Taylor	March 28, 1853	April 2, 1853	Appointed, then removed by Leonard J. Farwell
2	Henry Brown	April 2, 1853	January 2, 1854	Appointed by Leonard J. Farwell
3	Argalus Starks	January 2, 1854	January 7, 1856	Elected 1853
4	Edward McGarry	January 7, 1856	January 4, 1858	Elected 1855
5	Edward M. McGraw	January 4, 1858	January 2, 1860	Elected 1857
6	Hans Christian Heg	January 2, 1860	January 6, 1862	Elected 1859
7	Alexander P. Hodges	January 6, 1862	January 4, 1864	Elected 1861
8	Henry Cordier	January 4, 1864	January 3, 1870	Elected 1863
9	George F. Wheeler	January 3, 1870	January 4, 1874	Elected 1869

=== Secretaries (1989–present) ===
Order	Secretary	Took office	Left office	Notes
1	Stephen E. Bablitch	January 1, 1990	January 7, 1991	Appointed by Tommy Thompson.
2	Patrick J. Fiedler	January 7, 1991	November 24, 1993	Appointed by Tommy Thompson.
3	Michael J. Sullivan	November 24, 1993	January 8, 1999	Appointed by Tommy Thompson.
4	Jon Litscher	January 8, 1999	January 3, 2003	Appointed by Tommy Thompson.
5	Matthew J. Frank	January 3, 2003	September 4, 2007	Appointed by Jim Doyle.
6	Rick Raemisch	September 4, 2007	January 3, 2011	Appointed by Jim Doyle.
7	Gary Hamblin	January 3, 2011	October 26, 2012	Appointed by Scott Walker.
8	Ed Wall	October 27, 2012	March 15, 2016	Appointed by Scott Walker.
9	Jon Litscher	March 15, 2016	June 11, 2018	Appointed by Scott Walker.
10	Cathy Jess	June 11, 2018	January 7, 2019	Appointed by Scott Walker.
11	Kevin Carr	January 7, 2019	March 8, 2024	Appointed by Tony Evers.
12	Jared Hoy	May 24, 2024		Appointed by Tony Evers.

== See also ==
- List of United States state correction agencies
- List of law enforcement agencies in Wisconsin
- List of Wisconsin state prisons
- Wisconsin witch hunt
