= Chandler Halderson =

American parent murderer (born 1998)

- Halderson during his police interrogation in 2021
- Born: Chandler Michael Halderson; March 15, 1998 (age 28); Windsor, Wisconsin, U.S.
- Other names: "Chaz"; Tom Sellsnick (fictitious North East Remote Human "Recources" Manager, American Family Insurance); Alyssa Bran(d)t (fictitious Madison Area Technical College advisor); Aaron Hoover (fictitious MATC advisor); Daniel Speith (fictitious MATC counselor)
- Education: Madison Area Technical College
- Parent(s): Krista Rae (Frater) Halderson (1968–2021); Bart A. Halderson (1971–2021)
- Status: In prison
- Motive: Pathological lying
- Penalty: 2 life sentences without the possibility of parole

Details
- Victims: 2
- Date: July 2021
- Country: United States
- State: Wisconsin
- Targets: Krista Rae (Frater) Halderson; Bart A. Halderson
- Killed: 2
- Injured: 0
- Weapon: SKS rifle
- Date apprehended: July 8, 2021

Chandler Michael Halderson (born March 15, 1998) is an American criminal who murdered and dismembered his parents, Bart and Krista Halderson, in Dane County, Wisconsin, in July 2021.

== Investigation and arrest ==
On July 7, 2021, Chandler reported to the authorities that his parents had left for their cabin in Langlade County, Wisconsin with another unknown couple, but had never arrived. On July 8, during a search of a property associated with Cathryn Mellender and recently visited by Chandler, investigators discovered a mutilated torso with several bullet wounds, which they identified as Bart Halderson. (A rifle that belonged to Chandler would later be discovered on the same property.)

On the night of July 8, Chandler was arrested for lying to detectives, but he would subsequently be charged with killing and dismembering his parents.

One week later on July 14, a pair of severed legs was found in a spot that Chandler often visited near the Wisconsin River in Roxbury, Wisconsin. They were subsequently identified as belonging to Krista Halderson. Her specific cause of death could not be determined, as the only remains found were her legs.

== Trial ==
Chandler Halderson was charged with two counts of first-degree intentional homicide, providing false information on missing persons, mutilating a corpse, and hiding a corpse. He entered a plea of not guilty and went to trial in January 2022, with opening statements starting on January 4. Prosecutors argued that Chandler murdered his parents after they discovered that he was lying about various aspects of his life. Chandler had stated numerous times that he was attending Madison Area Technical College, was an employee with the local branch of American Family Insurance, and was planning to move to Titusville, Florida, with his girlfriend Cathryn Mellender, where he would be working at SpaceX.

They further argued that after confronting Chandler about his not making any money, Bart called Madison College, and that in the course of that call he learned that Chandler was not actually enrolled at the school. They alleged that on a day when Bart planned to attend a meeting with Chandler at MATC, Chandler shot him in the back with a high-powered rifle gifted to him by a friend, and that he then texted his mother Krista, whom he also killed when she came home. He then dismembered their bodies and scattered the pieces throughout southern Wisconsin.

On Thursday, March 17, 2022, Halderson was convicted on all charges and sentenced to life in prison without the possibility of parole. He has made numerous attempts to appeal his convictions, and most recently, on June 16, 2026, the Wisconsin Supreme Court denied a request to review his case.
