= KMCI =

KMCI may refer to:

- KMCI-TV, a television station (channel 25, virtual 38) licensed to serve Lawrence, Kansas, United States
- The ICAO code for Kansas City International Airport in Kansas City, Missouri
- Kettle Moraine Correctional Institution, a medium-security prison in rural Plymouth, Wisconsin
