= Stanley Correctional Institution =

State prison for men in Wisconsin, United States

Coordinates: 44°56′56″N 90°57′19″W

- Interactive map of Stanley Correctional Institution
- Location: 100 Corrections Drive Stanley, Wisconsin
- Status: Open
- Security class: Medium
- Capacity: 1500
- Opened: 1998
- Managed by: Wisconsin Department of Corrections

The Stanley Correctional Institution is a state prison for men located in Stanley, Chippewa County, Wisconsin, owned and operated by the Wisconsin Department of Corrections. A maximum capacity of 1500 inmates are held at medium security.

The facility was constructed in 1998 as a joint venture between the city of Stanley and the Dominion Corporation, then bought by the state in 2001.

== Notable inmates ==
- Nicolae Miu, convicted in the 2022 Apple River stabbing

== See also ==
- List of Wisconsin state prisons
