= Redgranite Correctional Institution =

Prison in Wisconsin

Coordinates: 44°03′13″N 89°06′31″W

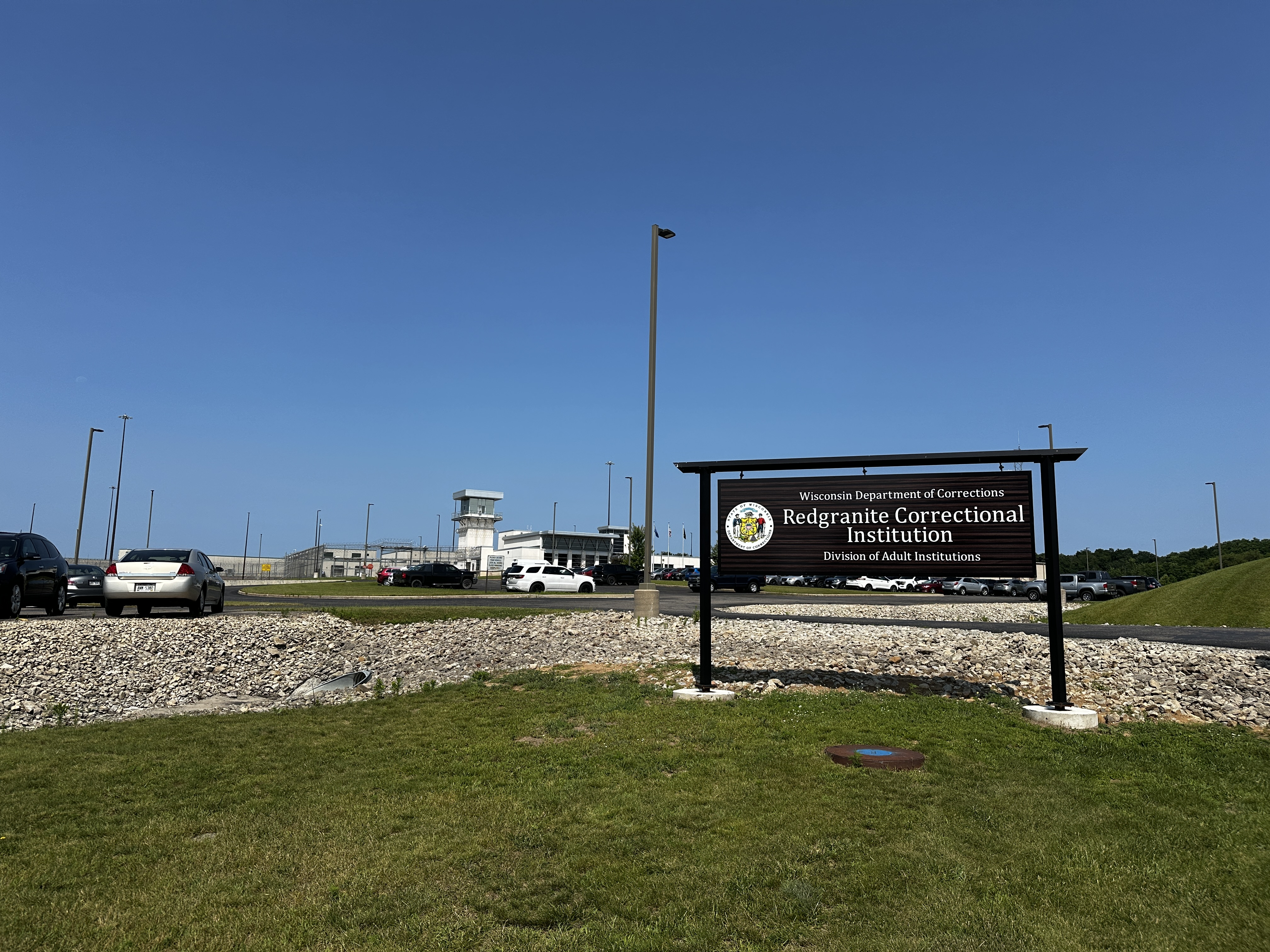
- Redgranite Correctional Institution pictured in July 2024
- Interactive map of Redgranite Correctional Institution
- Location: Redgranite, Wisconsin
- Status: Operational
- Security class: Medium
- Capacity: 990 males (operating)
- Population: 1,033 males (2025)
- Opened: January 8, 2001
- Managed by: Wisconsin Department of Corrections; Division of Adult Institutions
- Warden: Michael Gierach

The Redgranite Correctional Institution is a medium security adult male correctional institution located in Redgranite, Wisconsin, in the United States.

The prison is operated by the Wisconsin Department of Corrections. Groundbreaking occurred on June 18, 1999, and it opened on January 8, 2001. Boldt Construction Company built it for the state at a cost of $52.9 million. The prison encompasses 89 acres of land, 22 acres of which are within the perimeter. In 2025, Redgranite reported operating expenditures of $49,531,951 for a per capita of $48,230.

== Demographics ==
The operating capacity of the prison is 990. As of June 30, 2025, the prison held 1,033 prisoners with an average age of 43. The population reported military experience of 6%, and the following religions: Protestant/Other Christian (45%), Islam (11%), Pagan (11%), No Preference/Unknown (11%), and Roman Catholic (9%).

== See also ==
- List of Wisconsin state prisons
