= New Lisbon Correctional Institution =

State prison in Wisconsin, USA

Coordinates: 43°52′54″N 90°07′55″W

- Interactive map of New Lisbon Correctional Institution
- Location: 2000 Progress Road New Lisbon, Wisconsin
- Status: Operational
- Security class: Medium
- Capacity: 1,200
- Opened: 2004
- Managed by: Wisconsin Department of Corrections

The New Lisbon Correctional Institution is a state prison for men located in New Lisbon, Juneau County, Wisconsin, owned and operated by the Wisconsin Department of Corrections. The facility opened in 2002 and holds 950 inmates at medium security.

== See also ==
- List of Wisconsin state prisons
