= Milwaukee Secure Detention Facility =

Prison in Wisconsin, United States

Coordinates: 43°02′37″N 87°55′30″W

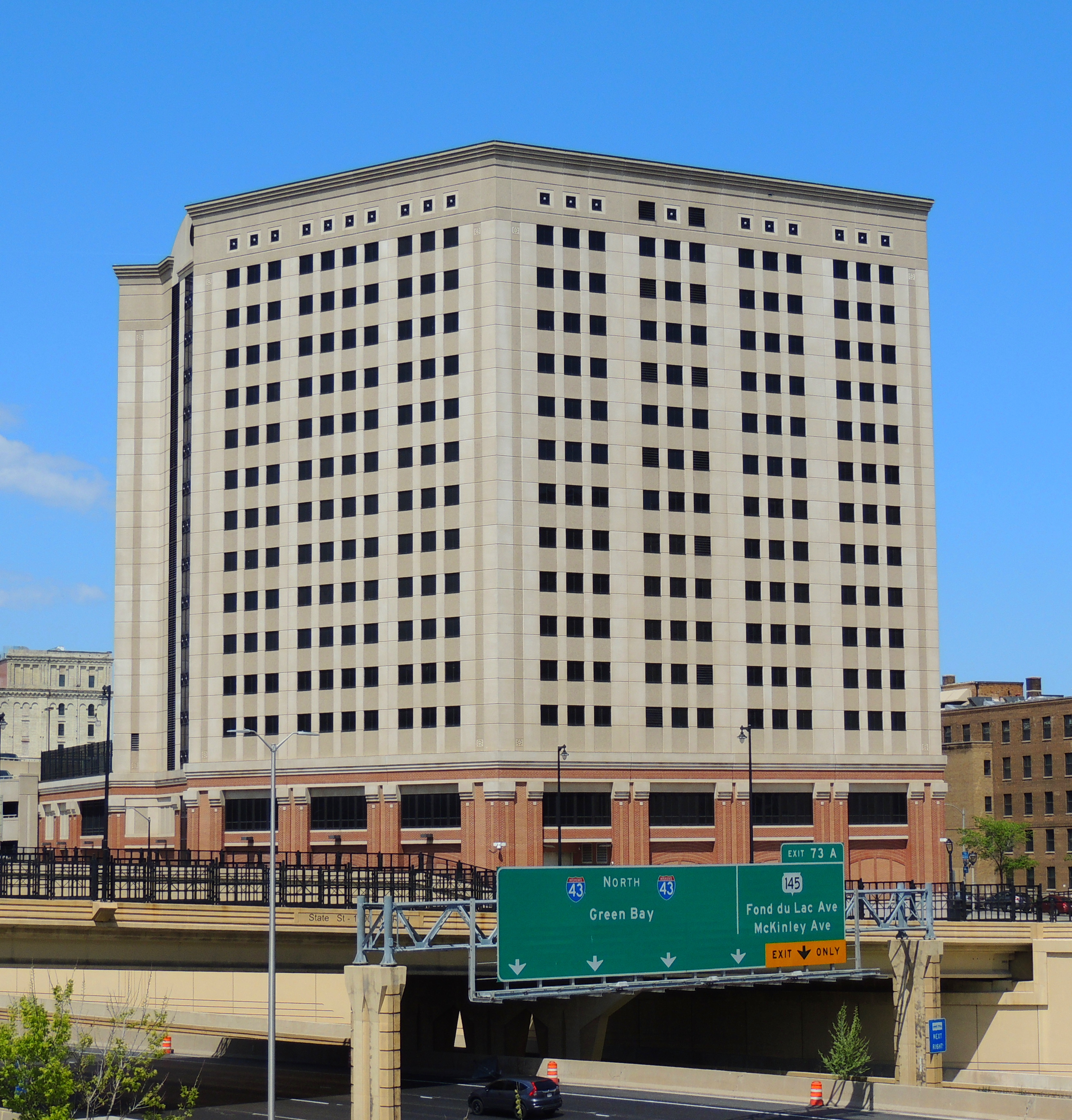
- Milwaukee Secure Detention Facility, along Interstate 43
- Interactive map of Milwaukee Secure Detention Facility
- Location: 1015 North 10th Street Milwaukee, Wisconsin
- Security class: Medium
- Opened: October 2001
- Managed by: Wisconsin Department of Corrections

The Milwaukee Secure Detention Facility is a state prison for men located in Milwaukee, Wisconsin. It is owned and operated by the Wisconsin Department of Corrections. The facility opened in October 2001 and holds 1,040 inmates at medium security. The building is located along Interstate 43 one block north of the Milwaukee County Courthouse, and diagonally across the street from the Milwaukee County Jail & Criminal Justice Facility.

A 350-stall parking garage is also part of the facility.

== See also ==
- List of Wisconsin state prisons
