= Stanley, Wisconsin =

- City
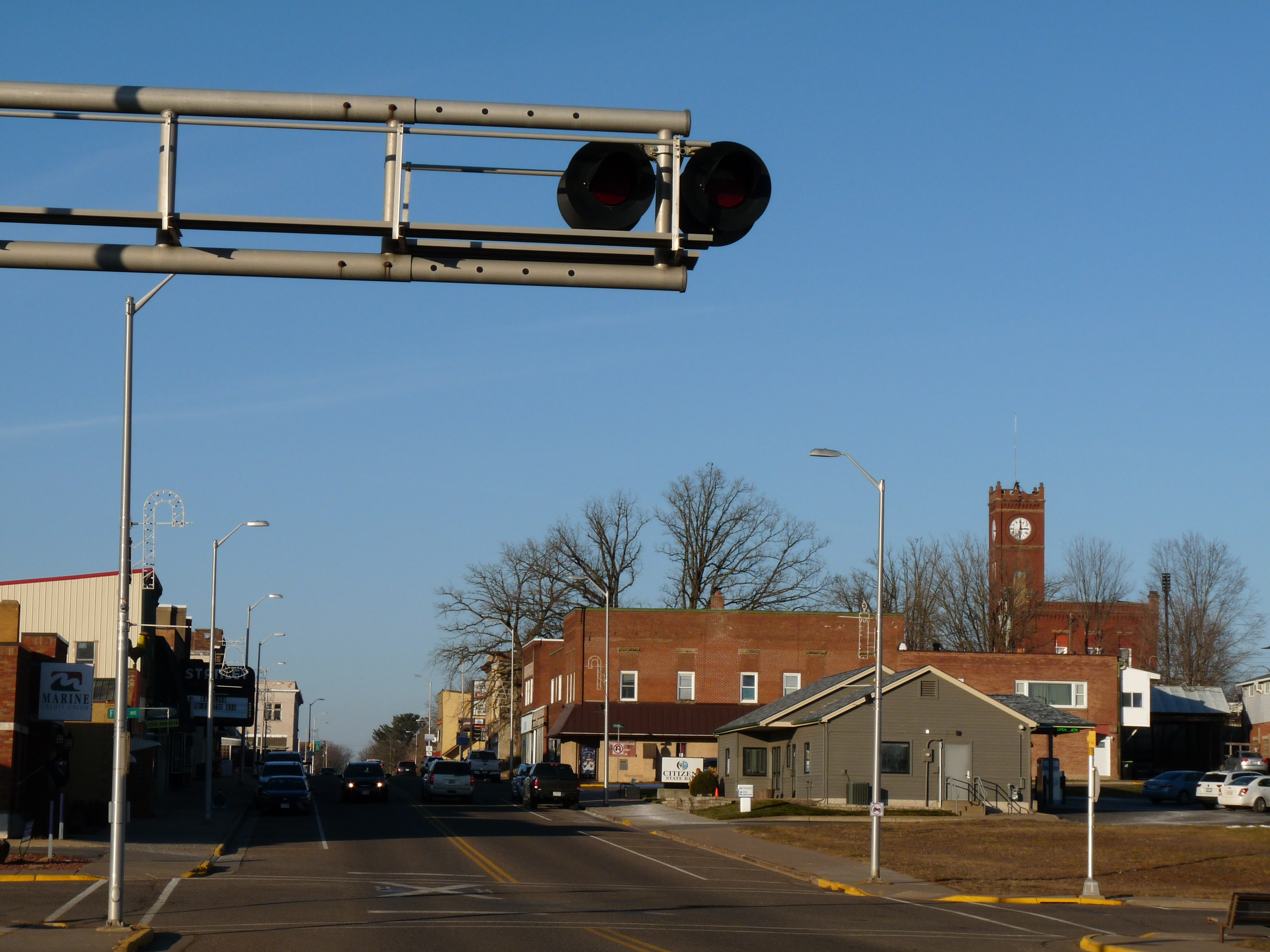
- Old downtown, facing north

- Location of Stanley in Chippewa County and Clark County, Wisconsin.

- Location within Wisconsin Location within the United States
- Coordinates: 44°58′N 90°56′W
- Country: United States
- State: Wisconsin
- Counties: Chippewa, Clark

Area
  - Total: 4.33 sq mi (11.22 km^{2})
  - Land: 4.27 sq mi (11.05 km^{2})
  - Water: 0.069 sq mi (0.18 km^{2})
- Elevation: 1,080 ft (330 m)

Population (2020)
  - Total: 3,804
  - Density: 891.6/sq mi (344.3/km^{2})
- Time zone: UTC−6 (Central (CST))
  - Summer (DST): UTC−5 (CDT)
- Area codes: 715 & 534
- FIPS code: 55-76625
- GNIS feature ID: 1574790
- Website: ci.stanley.wi.gov

Stanley is a city in Chippewa and Clark counties in the U.S. state of Wisconsin. The population was 3,804 at the 2020 census. Of this, 3,804 were in Chippewa County, and none were in Clark County.

== History ==
Stanley was settled and platted in 1881 when the Wisconsin Central Railroad built its line through Chippewa County. The settlement was named for Lemuel C. Stanley, a merchant and railroad man from Chippewa Falls who was involved in that first plat. The post office was established in 1881. Charles Levesqua opened the first saloon, Matthew Shilts opened the first store, and Peter Durand built the first hotel. The first religious organization was a Union Sunday School begun in 1883, which initially met in a warehouse. A school was organized the following year. The main early industries were a small steam sawmill and some charcoal kilns built by the York Iron Company in 1887, which converted local wood to charcoal that was then shipped by rail to fire the company's smelter at Black River Falls. The Northwestern Lumber Company had a distributing warehouse in Stanley during the early 1880s. In 1889 a four-room school was built to replace the one-room building.

In 1891 the Northwestern Lumber Company from Eau Claire started a big lumber mill at Stanley. Starting in the 1860s, Northwestern had sawed its lumber at its company town Porter's Mills, on the Chippewa River four miles below Eau Claire. But by the early 1890s Northwestern had exhausted its holdings of timber easy to drive down the river. Timber stands still remained on land away from the rivers, so Northwestern switched its model from river-logging to railroad-logging, and shut down Porter's Mills. The company built a new mill at Stanley and spawned the Stanley, Merrill and Phillips Railway to haul logs out of the country to the north and south. (The railway never reached Merrill or Phillips; its furthest reach was Walrath, to the north of Jump River.) The mill in Stanley sawed wood until 1920, when Northwestern's timber holdings in the area were largely exhausted. Over that period, the mill is estimated to have sawed 850 million board feet of lumber.

Through the 1890s the population of Stanley increased from 500 to 2500. Northwestern Lumber began providing electricity for lights in 1891. Stanley became a village in 1895 and separated politically from the Town of Delmar as the City of Stanley in 1898. The city's first bank was chartered in 1900. That same year Northwestern Lumber gave the city 2.5 acres for a park in town. In 1901 the city installed a public water system and started a sewage system which emptied into the river. In 1897, attracted by rail connections and the supply of hemlock bark, the United States Leather Company opened a tannery in Stanley which employed 200 men and by 1908 tanned 75,000 hides shipped in from Chicago to South America. Stanley's other big early industry was the Big Four Canning Factory on the north side of town, where immigrant farmers brought wagonloads of peas, cabbage, corn and beets grown on the logging cutover. In 1914 Big Four produced up to 100,000 cans of vegetables per day, shipping them all over the country. A creamery was started in 1903. The first high school was established in 1905.

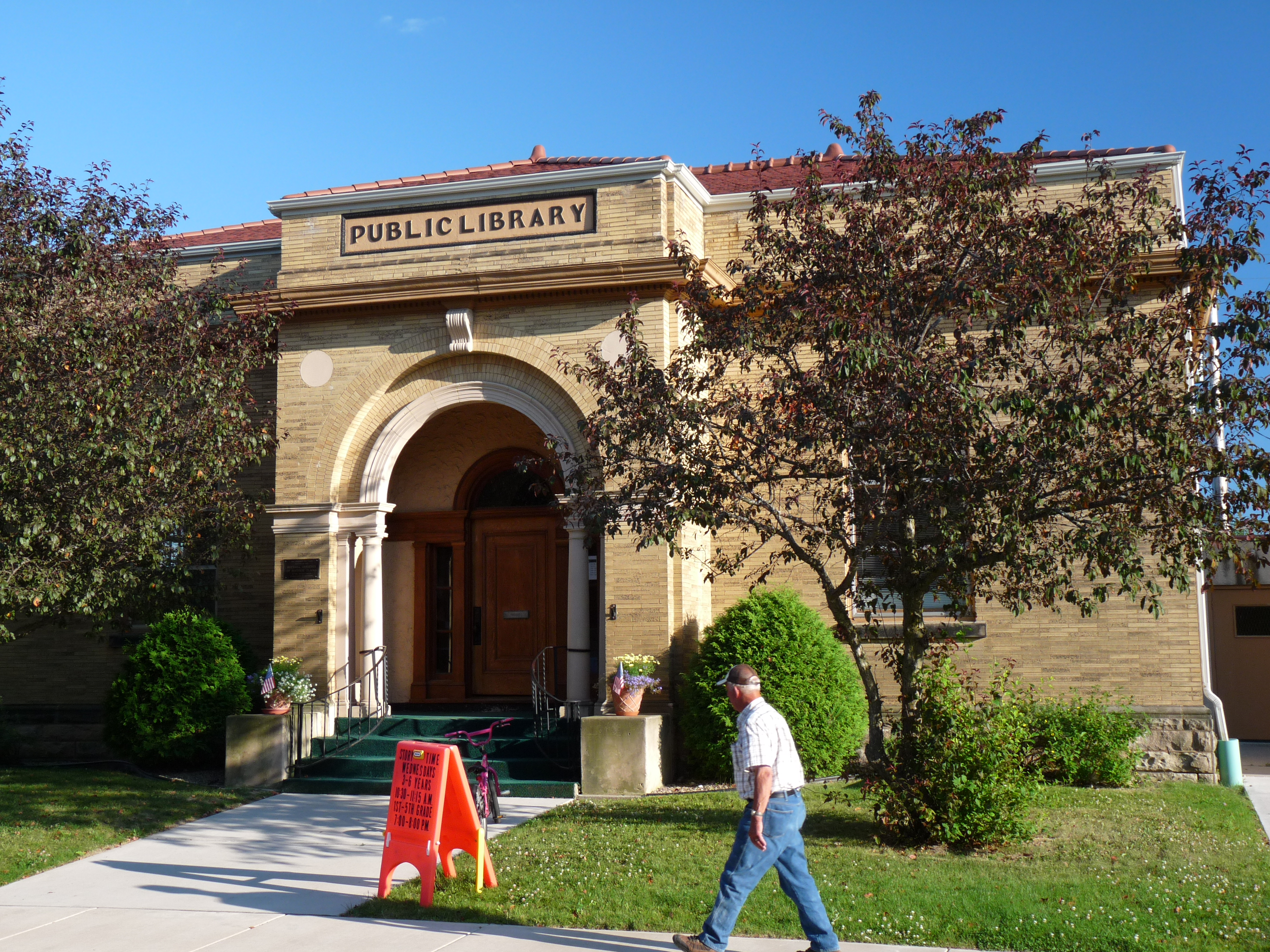
The D.R. Moon Library was donated in 1901 to the people of Stanley by the family of the Northwestern Lumber Company's president.

On May 18, 1906, a fire started in one of the Northwest Lumber Company buildings east of the current Chapman Lake in what is now Fandry Park. The fire quickly spread to other businesses and into the residential area to the east. It ended up destroying a number of business buildings, two churches, and about seventy homes. But neighbors helped neighbors, businesses rebuilt (some with fireproof brick), and the city moved on. The Northwestern Lumber Company had started a brickyard around 1900, digging its clay north of Chapman Park's location. After the fire in 1906, production increased greatly to rebuild Stanley and buildings as far off as Eau Claire and Auburndale.

Stanley began paving its streets in 1911. The Stanley Shoe company began making lumberman's shoes in 1912.

Stanley's prison began construction in 1998, a joint project of the private Dominion Company and the City of Stanley. In 2001 the State of Wisconsin bought the facility and it is now operated as a medium-security facility, housing around 1500.

On May 20, 2002, the City of Stanley annexed a portion of land in the Town of Thorp in Clark County.

On December 15, 2021, an EF2 tornado went through the city starting southwest and went northeast. It damaged several buildings including the historic train depot. There was no Injuries/Deaths. Notably, the buildings of Chwala's Construction were destroyed, but due to insurance, resumed fairly quickly

== Geography ==
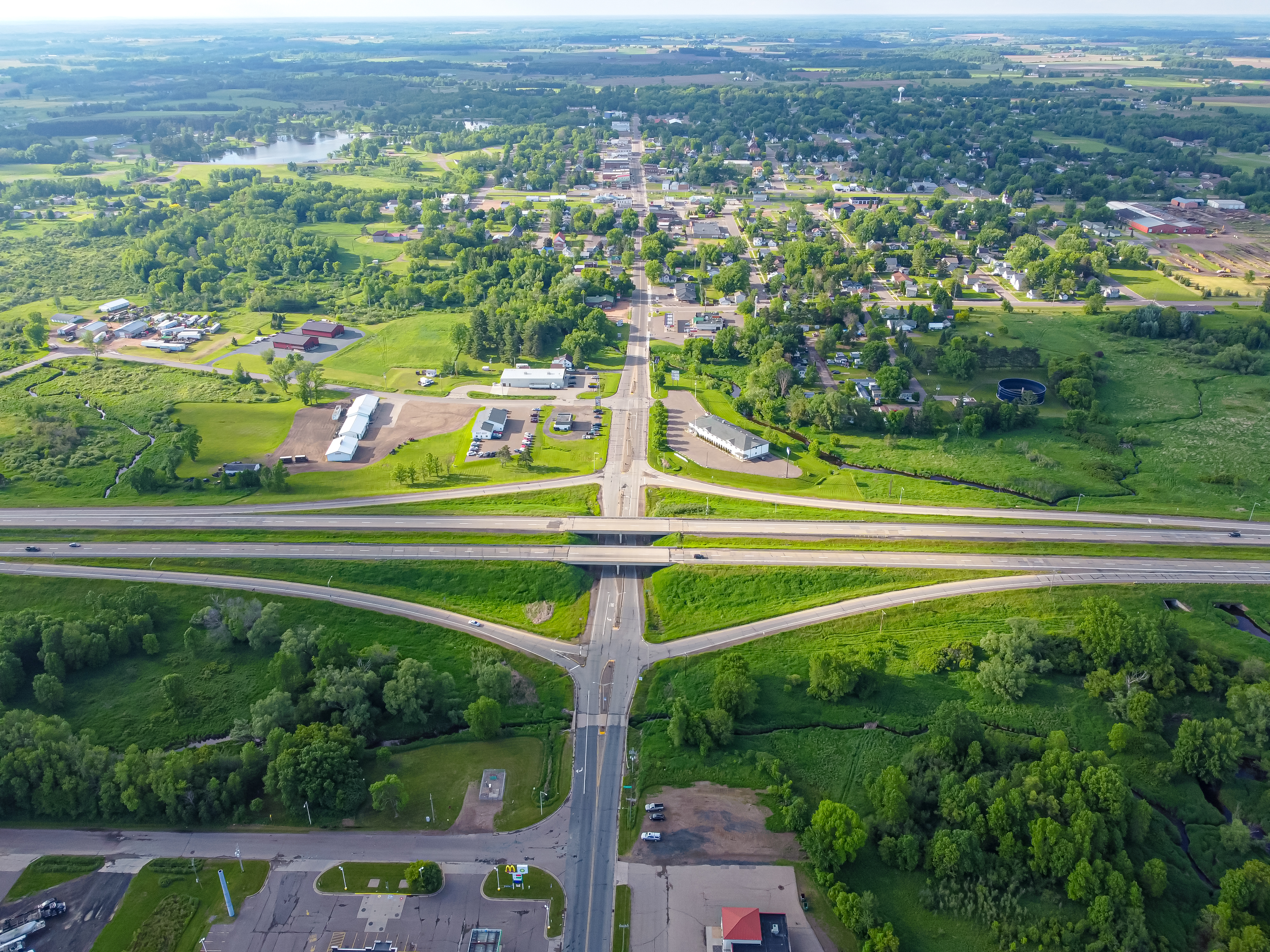
Stanley, Wisconsin

According to the United States Census Bureau, the city has a total area of 4.25 square miles (11.01 km^{2}), of which 4.18 square miles (10.83 km^{2}) is land and 0.07 square miles (0.18 km^{2}) is water.

Stanley is located primarily on the north side of Wisconsin State Highway 29. It is mostly in Chippewa County, but parts of the east side are in Clark County.

== Demographics ==
Historical population
Census	Pop.	Note	%±
1900	2,387		—
1910	2,675		12.1%
1920	2,577		−3.7%
1930	1,988		−22.9%
1940	2,021		1.7%
1950	2,014		−0.3%
1960	2,014		0.0%
1970	2,049		1.7%
1980	2,095		2.2%
1990	2,011		−4.0%
2000	1,898		−5.6%
2010	3,608		90.1%
2020	3,804		5.4%
U.S. Decennial Census

As of 2000 the median income for a household in the city was $27,644, and the median income for a family was $41,964. Males had a median income of $27,900 versus $21,607 for females. The per capita income for the city was $19,421. About 4.0% of families and 8.0% of the population were below the poverty line, including 10.8% of those under age 18 and 11.2% of those age 65 or over.

=== 2010 census ===
As of the census of 2010, there were 3,608 people, 930 households, and 532 families residing in the city. The population density was 863.2 inhabitants per square mile (333.3/km^{2}). There were 1,006 housing units at an average density of 240.7 per square mile (92.9/km^{2}). The racial makeup of the city was 80.4% White, 16.6% African American, 1.7% Native American, 0.6% Asian, 0.2% Pacific Islander, 0.2% from other races, and 0.3% from two or more races. Hispanic or Latino of any race were 3.1% of the population.

There were 930 households, of which 30.0% had children under the age of 18 living with them, 40.9% were married couples living together, 11.3% had a female householder with no husband present, 5.1% had a male householder with no wife present, and 42.8% were non-families. 37.8% of all households were made up of individuals, and 21.3% had someone living alone who was 65 years of age or older. The average household size was 2.26 and the average family size was 2.96.

The median age in the city was 37.6 years. 15.1% of residents were under the age of 18; 9% were between the ages of 18 and 24; 39.1% were from 25 to 44; 24.9% were from 45 to 64; and 12% were 65 years of age or older. The gender makeup of the city was 68.8% male and 31.2% female.

== Healthcare ==
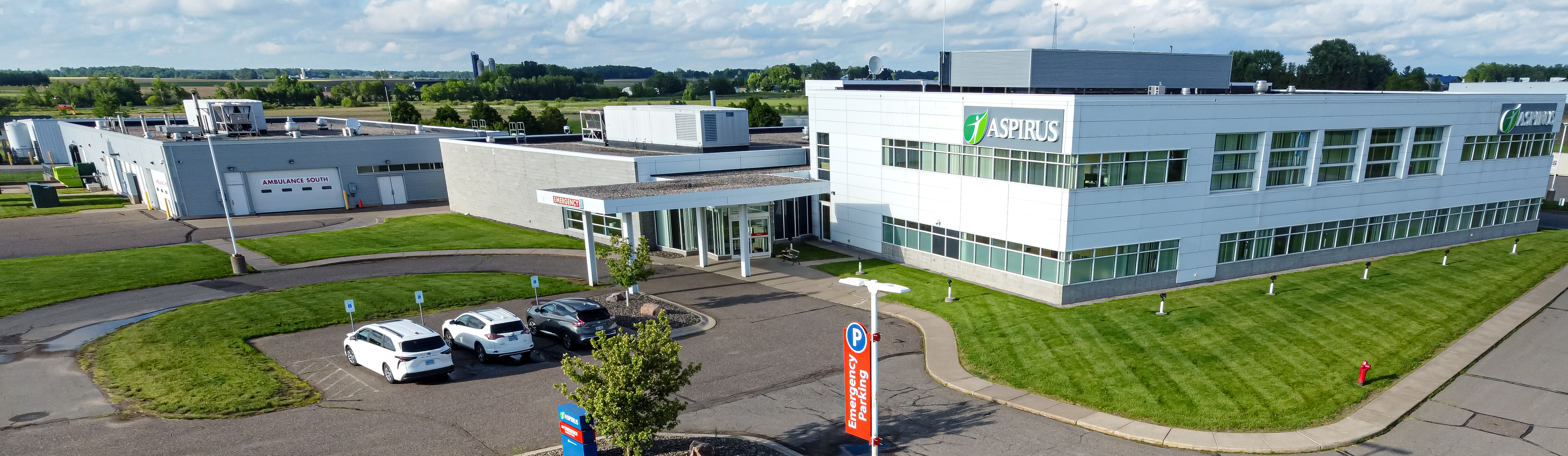
Aspirus hospital

Aspirus Stanley Hospital is a 24-bed critical access hospital with a level IV trauma center. The area is located in both a mental health and primary care Health Professional Shortage Area (HPSA) qualifying the area as a medical desert. There are 14.6 primary care physicians per 100,000 population in Stanley compared to the statewide average of 75.6. By 2035, the area is expected to have a 53% deficit in physicians, the fifth largest predicted deficit in Wisconsin. There are no behavioral health physicians in Stanley.

== Education ==
Stanley-Boyd High School
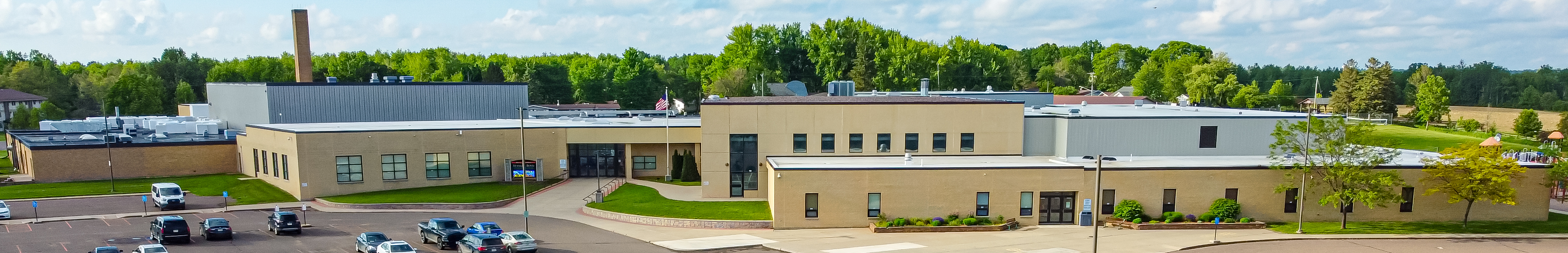
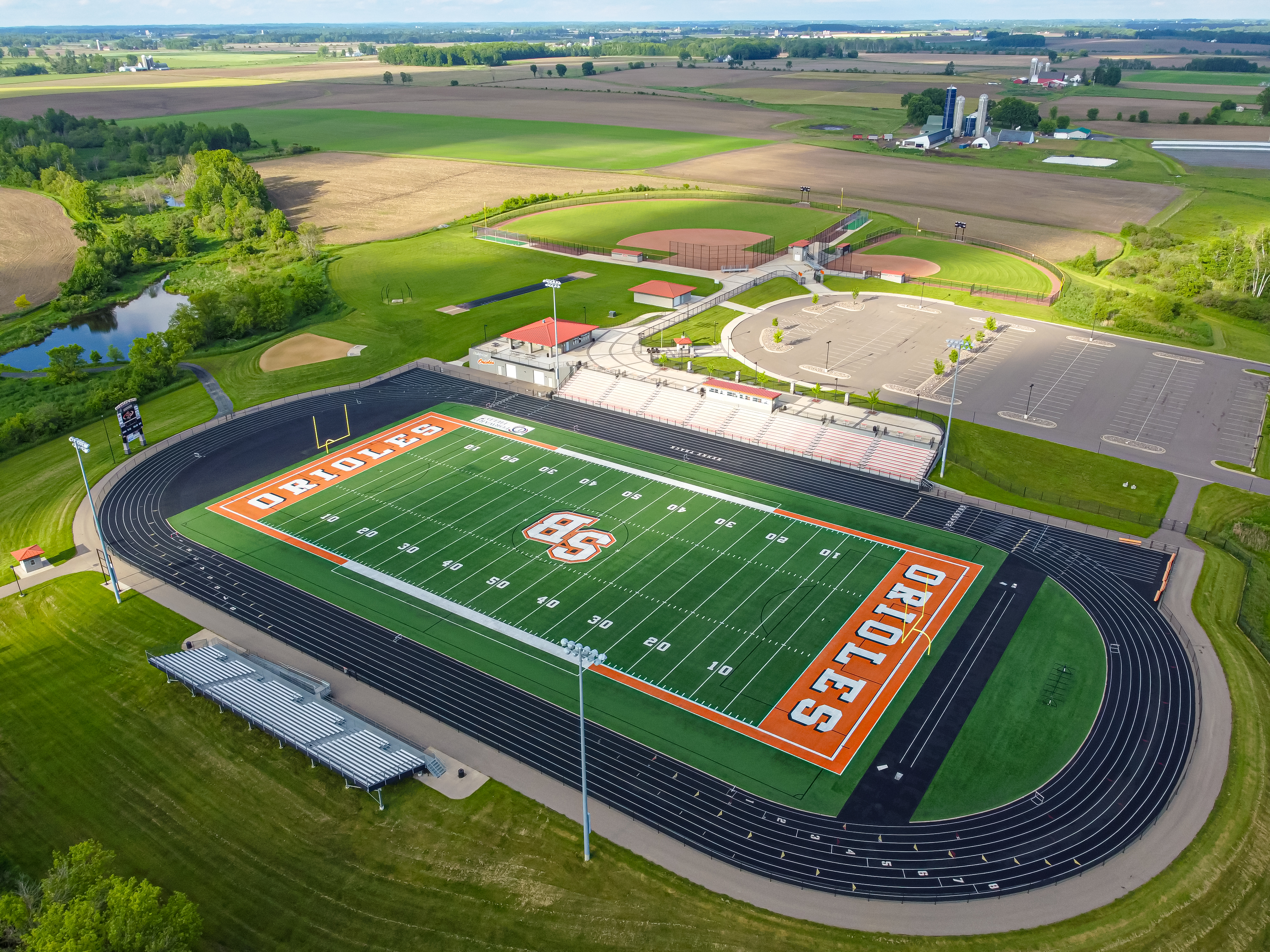

Students residing in Stanley and the neighboring village of Boyd are served by Stanley-Boyd Elementary School, Stanley-Boyd Middle School, and Stanley-Boyd High School. The high school has an enrollment of 332 students. For interscholastic sports, Stanley-Boyd High School is a member of the Cloverbelt Conference of the WIAA.

== Stanley Correctional Institution ==
The city is the site of the Stanley Correctional Institution.

== Notable people ==
- Robert Whitney Burns, U.S. Air Force Lieutenant General
- Dave Cahill, Philadelphia Eagles, Los Angeles Rams, and Atlanta Falcons
- Clarence B. Culbertson, Wisconsin State Representative
- George H. Hipke, Wisconsin State Senator
- Larry Krause, Green Bay Packers
- Charlie McCrackin, Comedian and writer
- Vincent Mroz, Secret Service agent
- David Plombon, Wisconsin State Representative
- Terry A. Willkom, Wisconsin State Representative

== See also ==
- List of cities in Wisconsin
