= Archie Miller (Medal of Honor) =

American soldier and Medal of Honor recipient

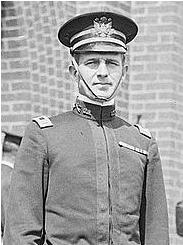
- Captain Archie Miller, 2nd Cavalry
- Born: September 23, 1878; Fort Sheridan, Illinois, US
- Died: May 28, 1921 (aged 42); Morgantown, Maryland, US
- Burial place: Arlington National Cemetery
- Relatives: Brig. Gen. Samuel M. Whitside (father-in-law); Col. Warren W. Whitside (brother-in-law)
- Military career
- Allegiance: United States
- Branch: United States Army
- Service years: 1898–1921
- Rank: Colonel
- Unit: 6th Cavalry Regiment
- Conflicts: Philippine–American War; Moro Rebellion
- Awards: Medal of Honor

Archie Miller (September 23, 1878 – May 28, 1921) was a United States Army officer who received the Medal of Honor for actions during the Philippine–American War July 2, 1909. Lieutenant Miller defended a machine gun from capture by the enemy. He later rose to lieutenant colonel.

He was serving as a first lieutenant in the 6th U.S. Cavalry at Patian Island, Philippine Islands, on July 2, 1909, when he earned his Medal of Honor. Sergeant Joseph Henderson also received the medal for the same action.

Archie Miller is buried in Arlington National Cemetery Section 1 Lot 200.

== Early life ==
Born in Illinois on September 23, 1878, Col. Miller attended the public schools of Chicago. He was an A.B. man of St. Mary's College, Kansas, and St. Louis University. At the outbreak of the Spanish–American War, he enlisted with the state volunteers and saw service in Cuba, reaching the rank of first lieutenant. In 1899, he went to the Philippines for a year, transferring later to the Regular Army Cavalry.

Miller married Madeleine Whitside, daughter of Brigadier General Samuel Whitside. Their daughter, Caroline, would marry Lieutenant General Robert Whitney Burns.

== Military service ==
=== Medal of Honor ===
President Taft presented Capt. Archie Miller the Medal of Honor in the East Room of the White House on 23 November 1912

- Rank and organization: First Lieutenant, 6th U.S. Cavalry.
- Place and date: At Patian Island, Philippine Islands, July 2, 1909.
- Entered service at: St. Louis, Missouri.
- Birth: Fort Sheridan, Illinois.
- Date of issue: 23 Nov 1912.

Citation:

While in action against hostile Moros, when the machinegun detachment, having been driven from its position by a heavy fire, 1 member being killed, did, with the assistance of an enlisted man, place the machinegun in advance of its former position at a distance of about 20 yards from the enemy, in accomplishing which he was obliged to splice a piece of timber to one leg of the gun tripod, all the while being under a heavy fire, and the gun tripod being several times struck by bullets.

A New York Times headline summed up the action in which 1st Lt. Archie Miller and a fellow trooper would be awarded the Medal of Honor, "Battled on Ledge with Moro Outlaws. Jikiri's Band Wiped Out Only After Desperate Hand-to-Hand Fighting. SOUGHT SAFETY IN CAVE Driven Out by the American Fire, Jikiri Tries to Behead Lieut. Wilson, but Is Shot Down."

=== Dates of rank ===
	First lieutenant Missouri Infantry, United States Volunteers: August 4, 1898; honorably mustered out May 10, 1899.
No Insignia in 1899	Second lieutenant 32nd Infantry, U.S.V.: July 5, 1899, accepted July 14.
	First lieutenant, U.S.V.: September 1, 1900; honorably mustered out May 8, 1901. 6th Cavalry Regiment, United States Army: February 28, 1901
	Captain of Cavalry U.S. Army: April 13, 1911; Quartermaster May 2, 1912; assigned to 2nd Cavalry December 9, 1915.
	Major (Temp) Aviation Section, Signal Corps: August 5, 1917.
	Lieutenant Colonel (Temp) Aviation Section, Signal Corps: August 5 to March 10, 1918, accepted October 5, 1917.
	Colonel (Temp) Signal Corps, National Army: September 29, 1917, accepted March 11, 1918.
	Lieutenant Colonel of Cavalry, U.S. Army: July 1, 1920; transferred to Q.M.C. August 23, 1920.

During World War I, Miller was the commanding officer at Kelly and Rich Fields, Texas, and Camp Greene, North Carolina. In July 1918, Lieutenant Colonel Miller was placed in charge of all United States Army Air Service activities on Long Island, New York. As a member of the Air Service, Miller participated in the New York-to-Toronto-and-return air race and the transcontinental race. In 1919, Col. Miller testified before Congress to the Subcommittee on Aviation of the Committee on Military Affairs, which was considering a bill to create a "united" Air Service separate from either the Army or the Navy. In his testimony, Miller stated, "I was perhaps one of the original advocates of a united Air Service, immediately after the Armistice."

== Death ==
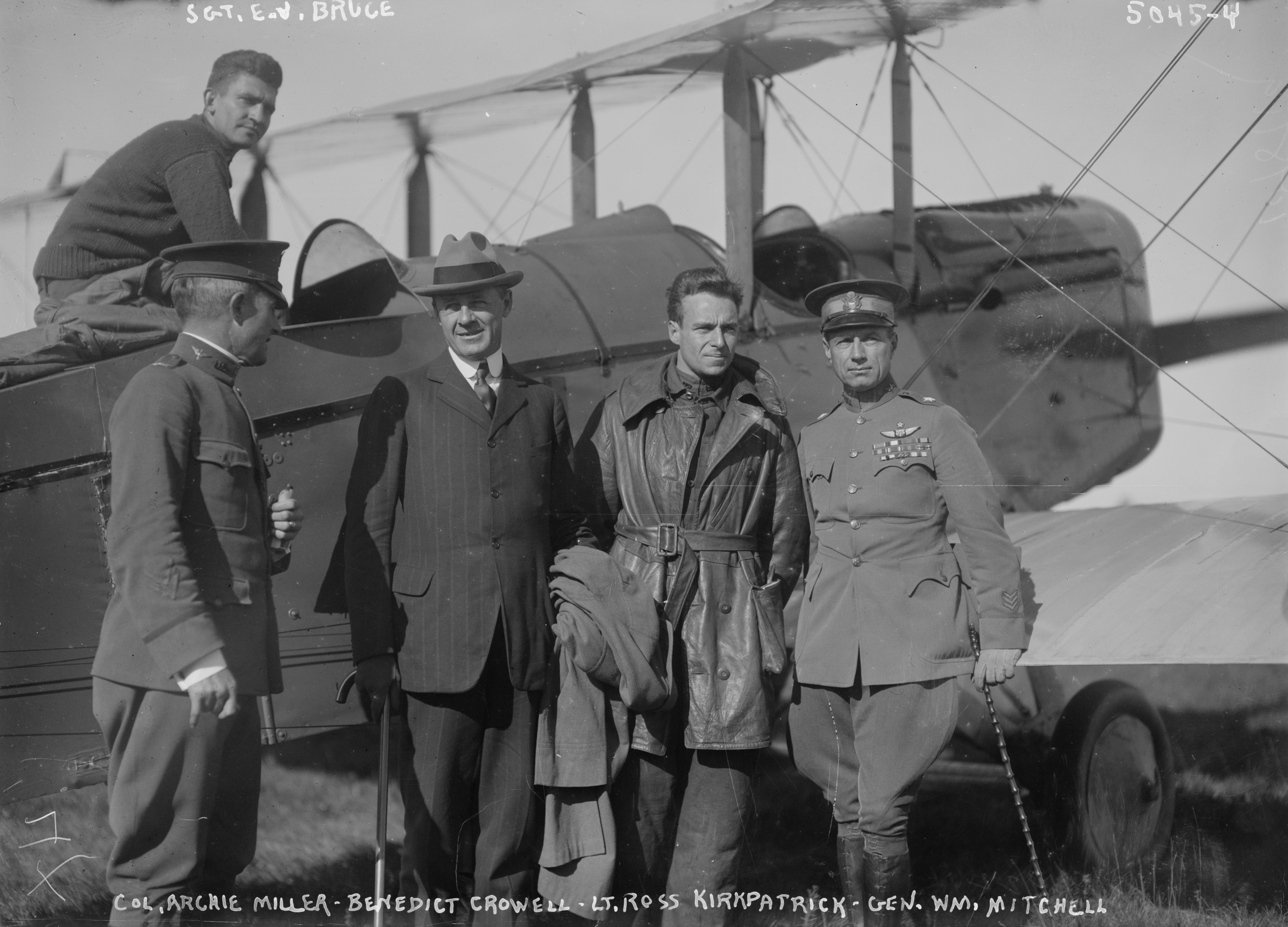
Foreground left to right: Col. Archie Miller, Benedict Crowell, Lt. Ross Kirkpatrick, Gen. Billy Mitchell; background at left: Sgt. E.N. Bruce

On May 28, 1921, Lt. Col. Archie Miller, four Air Service officers and an enlisted man, and two civilians were killed in the wreck of an Army Curtiss Eagle passenger airplane near Morgantown, Maryland, 40 miles (64 km) southeast of Washington, in a terrific wind and electrical storm. In addition to Miller, the dead were: Maurice Connolly of Dubuque, Iowa, formerly a member of the House of Representatives; A. G. Batchelder of Washington, chairman of the Board of the American Automobile Association; Lieutenant Stanley M. Ames of Washington, pilot of the wrecked plane; Lieutenant Cleveland M. McDermott, Langley Field, Virginia; Lieutenant John M. Pennewill, Langley Field, Virginia; and Sergeant Mechanic Richard Blumenkranz, Washington.

Army Air Service officers said the accident was the worst in the history of aviation in the United States and that it was one of the few in which all of the passengers in a falling plane had been killed almost instantly.

Colonel Miller was a hereditary companion of the Military Order of the Loyal Legion of the United States.

== See also ==
- List of Medal of Honor recipients
- List of Philippine–American War Medal of Honor recipients
- List of accidents and incidents involving military aircraft (pre-1925)
