= Jackson Correctional Institution (Wisconsin) =

Prison in Wisconsin

Coordinates: 44°18′25″N 90°47′20″W

- Interactive map of Jackson Correctional Institution
- Location: N6500 Haipek Rd Black River Falls, Wisconsin
- Security class: medium
- Capacity: 837
- Opened: May 1996

The Jackson Correctional Institution is a medium-security prison for adult males located in Black River Falls, Wisconsin. As of 2023, the prison had a population of 1,003 inmates, with an operating capacity of 837, and 292 staff. It is owned and maintained by the Wisconsin Department of Corrections. The facility was first opened in 1996.

== See also ==
- List of Wisconsin state prisons
