= Samuel Whitside =

United States Army general (1839–1904)

Samuel Marmaduke Whitside
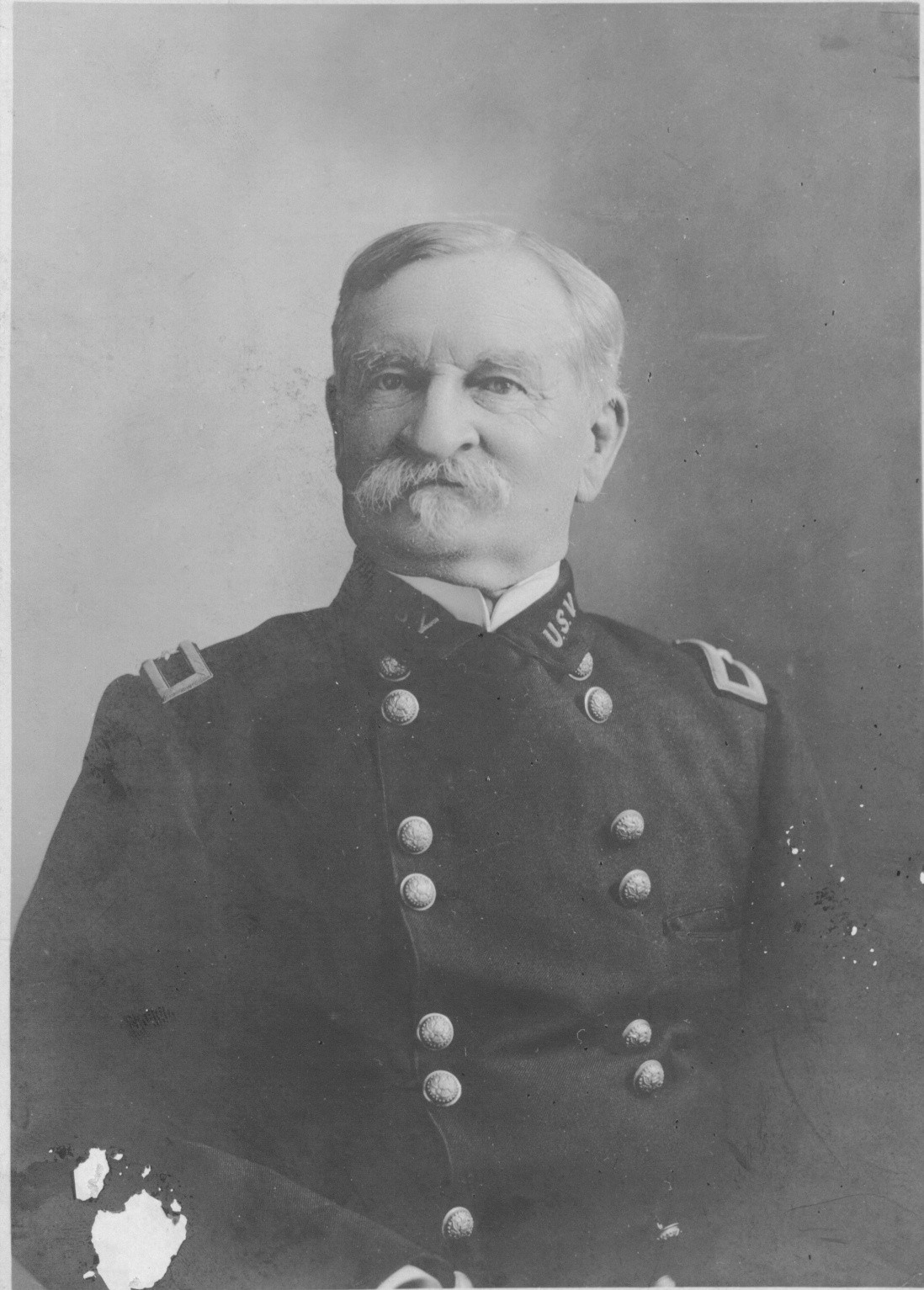
- Brig. Gen. S. M. Whitside at Santiago de Cuba, 10 Jun 1901, while serving as Commanding General of the District of Santiago
- Born: January 9, 1839; Toronto, Canada West
- Died: December 15, 1904 (aged 65); Washington, D.C., U.S.
- Burial place: Arlington National Cemetery
- Spouse: Carrie P. McGavock
- Relatives: Col. Warren Whitside (son); Lt. Col. Archie Miller (son-in-law)
- Military career
- Allegiance: United States
- Branch: United States Army: Union Army
- Service years: 1858–1902
- Rank: Brigadier general
- Units: 6th Cav Regt; 7th Cav Regt; 5th Cav Regt; 10th Cav Regt
- Commands: B Co, 6th Cav Regt; Camp Livingston, Texas; Camp Huachuca, Arizona; 3d & 2d Bns, 7th Cav Regt; Provisional Brigade Commander which included the 5th Cav Regt and 10th Cav Regt; 10th Cav Regt; Depts of Eastern Cuba and Santiago & Puerto Prinicipe Cuba; Dist of Santiago
- Conflicts: American Civil War; Battle of Williamsburg; Battle of Hanover Court House; Battle of Malvern Hill; Siege of Port Hudson; Battle of Culpeper Court House; Indian Wars; Comanche Wars; Apache Wars; Sioux Wars; Ghost Dance War; Wounded Knee Massacre; White Clay Creek; Spanish–American War; Occupation of Cuba
- Awards: Brevet Captain; Brevet Major

Samuel M. Whitside was a United States Cavalry officer who served from 1858 to 1902. He commanded at every level from company to department for 32 of his 43 years in service, including Army posts such a Camp Huachuca, Jefferson Barracks, and Fort Sam Houston, the Departments of Eastern Cuba and Santiago and Puerto Principe, Cuba, commanded a provisional cavalry brigade (consisting of the 10th and 5th Cavalry Regiments), a squadron in the 7th Cavalry Regiment, and a troop and platoon in the 6th Cavalry Regiment. The pinnacle of his career was serving as the commanding general of the Department of Eastern Cuba before retiring in June 1902 as a brigadier general in the U.S. Army.

Most history books record three events during his career: the founding of Fort Huachuca, Arizona, the massacre at Wounded Knee, and his continued role as a battalion commander during the Pine Ridge Campaign of 1890–91. These events are arguably the most noteworthy in Whitside's four decades in the U.S. cavalry.

== Joining the U.S. Army and service in the American Civil War ==
S. M. Whitside was born on January 9, 1839, in Toronto, Canada. He grew up in that area attending Normal School, and later moved to New York where he attended Careyville Academy.

He enlisted into the General Mounted Service in 1858 and served for three years at Carlisle Barracks, PA where he was promoted to the rank of Corporal. Corporal Whitside was assigned on July 27, 1861, to the 3rd Cavalry to fill a vacant noncommissioned officer position, and on August 1, he was promoted to sergeant major of the regiment. On August 3, Congress redesignated the 3d Cavalry as the 6th Cavalry Regiment.

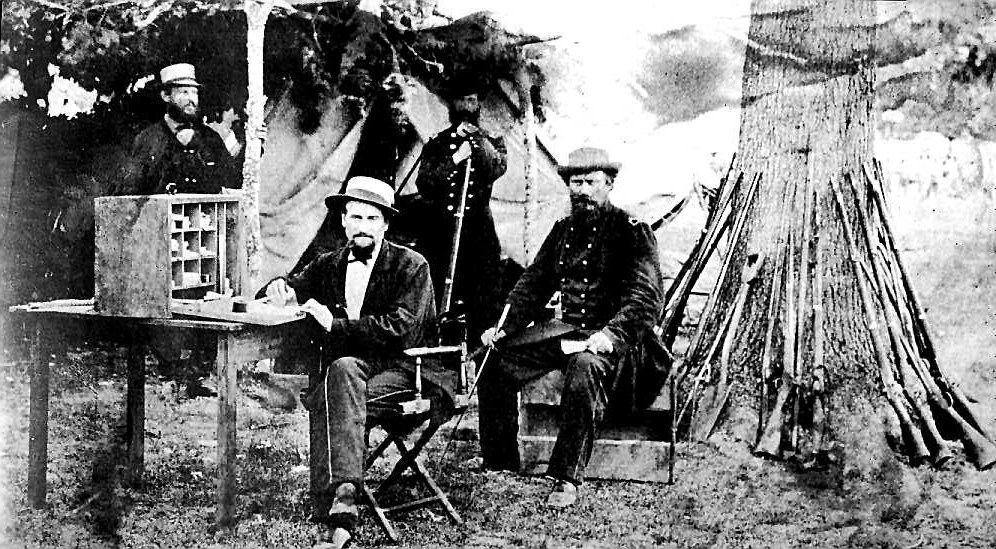
Group of 6th U.S. Cavalry officers in camp at Snickers Gap, Va., in 1862, standing, left to right, 2nd Lt. Thos. W. Simson, 1st Lt. Albert Coats. Sitting, left to right, 2nd Lt. Samuel Whitside, Captain August Kautz.

On November 1, three sergeants were offered commissions; among these was Sergeant Major Samuel M. Whitside. He accepted his appointment as a second lieutenant in the 6th U.S. Cavalry on November 4, 1861, and assumed the duties of a junior officer in Company K. His commander was Captain Charles R. Lowell.

Lieutenant Whitside served with his company in the 6th Cavalry during the Peninsular Campaign of 1862 where he participated in the following battles: Williamsburg – May 5, Slatersville – May 7, New Bridge – May 20, Ellison's Mills – May 23, Hanover Court House – 27 to May 29, Black Creek – June 26, and Malvern Hill – August 5,.

Whitside next served as an aide-de-camp on the staff of Major General Nathaniel Banks, and participated in the Siege of Port Hudson in Louisiana in 1863. However, Whitside suffered from a number of ailments—including smallpox—and was severely injured at the Battle of Culpeper Court House. After briefly serving as an aide to generals John H. Martindale and Alfred Pleasonton, he spent the remainder of the Civil War on recruiting duty in Rhode Island and mustering duty in West Virginia. He later received brevet promotions to captain and major for faithful and meritorious service.

After the war, Whitside became a First Class Companion of the Military Order of the Loyal Legion of the United States—a military society of Union officers and their descendants.

== Service on the frontier ==
Whitside served for the next 20 years with the 6th Cavalry commanding B Company at various posts throughout the West.

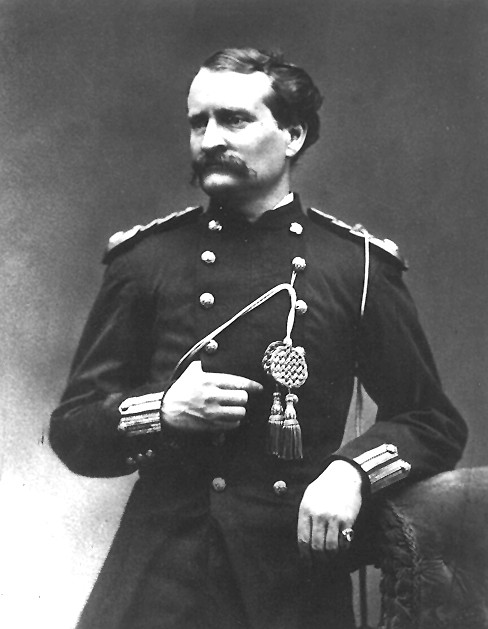
Founder of Fort Huachuca – Captain Samuel M. Whitside, 6th U.S. Cavalry Regiment, c. 1876. Dissatisfied with the condition of Camp Wallen, on 3 March Whitside led the two companies, consisting of four officers and 127 troopers, approximately nine miles up into the Huachuca Mountains where they encamped near a spring in a heavily wooded area that offered excellent observation over the valleys below. Whitside realized this was the perfect location for the new camp. On 4 March, he ordered initial entries in a journal, identifying their location as "Camp Huachuca, Huachuca Mountains, Arizona Territory, Captain S. M. Whitside Commanding Officer."

=== Texas, 1865–70 ===
- Austin
- Lockhart
- Sherman
- Jacksboro
- Livingston – Post Commander
- Fort Griffin

=== Missouri and Kansas, 1871–74 ===
- St. Louis, MO – Recruiting Duty
- Fort Riley, KS
- Fort Hays, KS
- Kansas City, MO
- Newport Barracks, KY

=== Arizona Territory, Colorado and Dakota Territory 1875–87 ===
- Camp McDowell, A.T.
- Fort Lowell, A.T.
- Camp Huachuca, A.T. – Founded post in March 1877 and served as first post commander until March 1881.
- Fort Thomas, A.T.
- Washington, D.C., Rochester, NY, and Chicago, IL – recruiting service from 1882 to 1883
- Fort Apache, A.T.
- Fort Lewis, CO

After eighteen years as a captain and almost twenty-four years with the 6th Cavalry Regiment, Whitside was transferred to the 7th Cavalry Regiment in 1885 and promoted to major. The 7th was then serving in the Dakota Territory at various posts, including Fort Meade. In 1887 the regiment moved to Fort Riley, Kansas, and a more settled lifestyle. During the previous twenty-two years of service on the frontier, Whitside married and had seven children, four of which died in childhood, and served at over twenty posts, spending an average of ten months at any one location.

=== Wounded Knee Massacre ===
Whitside was the major of the 7th Cavalry at the time of the Wounded Knee Massacre in December 1890.

=== Spanish–American War service ===
Whitside served during the Spanish–American War as the lieutenant colonel of the 5th Cavalry.

== Dates of rank ==
Rank	Date	Unit	Component
Second Lieutenant	1 Nov 1861	K Co., 6th Cavalry Regiment	Regular Army
First Lieutenant	25 Jan 1864	A Co., 6th Cavalry Regiment	Regular Army
Captain	20 Oct 1866	B Co., 6th Cavalry Regiment	Regular Army
Major	20 Mar 1885	7th Cavalry Regiment	Regular Army
Lieutenant Colonel	17 Jul 1895	3rd Cavalry Regiment	Regular Army
Colonel	16 Oct 1898	10th Cavalry Regiment	Regular Army
Brigadier General	3 Jan 1901	Volunteers	
Brigadier General	29 May 1902	Regular Army	

== Personal life ==
Whitside was married to Caroline P. McGavock of Nashville, Tennessee, for thirty-six years. Of their seven children, three survived to adulthood. Their eldest surviving son, Warren Whitside, became a colonel in the Army Quartermaster Corps and his son, Warren Jr.; served in the U.S. Navy as a captain. Samuel and Caroline's daughter, Madeline, married 1st Lt. Archie Miller, a cavalry officer and eventual Medal of Honor recipient. Their daughter, Caroline, would marry Robert Whitney Burns, a future army lieutenant general. Their youngest child, Victor, became a Major in the Army and commanded an infantry battalion during the Meuse-Argonne Offensive before dying in Germany of pneumonia at the end of World War I.

Whitside, wife Caroline, and their son Victor are buried at Arlington National Cemetery, in Arlington, Virginia.

== Other references ==
- Carter, Lieutenant-Colonel W. W. From Yorktown to Santiago with the Sixth U.S. Cavalry, Baltimore, the Lord Baltimore Press, 1900.
- Coffman, Edward M. The Old Army: A Portrait of the American Army in Peacetime, 1784–1898. New York: Oxford University Press, 1986.
- DeMontravel, Peter R. The Career of Lieutenant General Nelson A. Miles from the Civil War through the Indian Wars. PhD diss, St. John's University. Ann Arbor: University Microfilms International, 1983.
- Erlandson, Marcus R. "Guy V. Henry: A Study in Leadership." MMAS thesis, Fort Leavenworth: Command and General Staff College, 1985.
- Garlington, Ernest A. "The Seventh Regiment of Cavalry," Journal of the Military Service Institution of the United States. Volume XVI (1895).
- Godfrey, Edward S. "Cavalry Fire Discipline," Journal of the Military Service Institution of the United States. Volume XIX (1896).
- Jensen, Richard E., R. Eli Paul, and John E. Carter. Eyewitness at Wounded Knee. Lincoln & London: University of Nebraska Press, 1991.
- Mooney, James. "The Ghost-Dance Religion and the Sioux Outbreak of 1890," of the Fourteenth Annual Report (Part 2) of the Bureau of Ethnology to the Smithsonian Institution, 1892–93, by J. W. Powell, Director. Washington, DC: Government Printing Office, 1896. Republication, The Ghost-Dance Religion and Wounded Knee. New York: Dover Publications, Inc, 1973.
- Scott, Brigadier General E. D. "Wounded Knee: A Look at the Record." Cavalry Journal, 48 (January–February 1939).
- Shaw, Dennis Edward. "The Battle of Wounded Knee: Myth Versus Reality." PhD diss, University of Miami, Ann Arbor: University Microfilm International, 1981.
- Smith, Rex Alan. Moon of Popping Trees. New York: Thomas Crowell Company, 1975.
- United States Congress, House Committee on the Judiciary. Wounded Knee Massacre: Hearings before the Committee on the Judiciary United States Senate, Ninety-fourth Congress, Second Session, on S. 1147 and S. 2900 to Liquidate the Liability of the United States for the Massacre of Sioux Indian Men, Women, and Children at Wounded Knee on December 29, 1890, February 5 and 6, 1976. Washington: Government Printing Office, 1976.
- Utley, Robert M. Frontier Regulars – The United States Army and the Indian, 1866–1891. Lincoln: University of Nebraska Press, 1973.
- Utley, Robert M. The Last Days of the Sioux Nation. New Haven and London: Yale University Press, 1963.
- War Department, The Adjutant General's Office. "Official Statement of Service of Samuel Marmaduke Whitside." Washington, DC, March 8, 1939.
- Wooster, Robert. Nelson A. Miles and the Twilight of the Frontier Army. University of Nebraska Press, Lincoln & London, 1993.
