= Oakhill Correctional Institution =

State prison in Wisconsin, US

Coordinates: 42°57′1.296″N 89°24′2.39″W

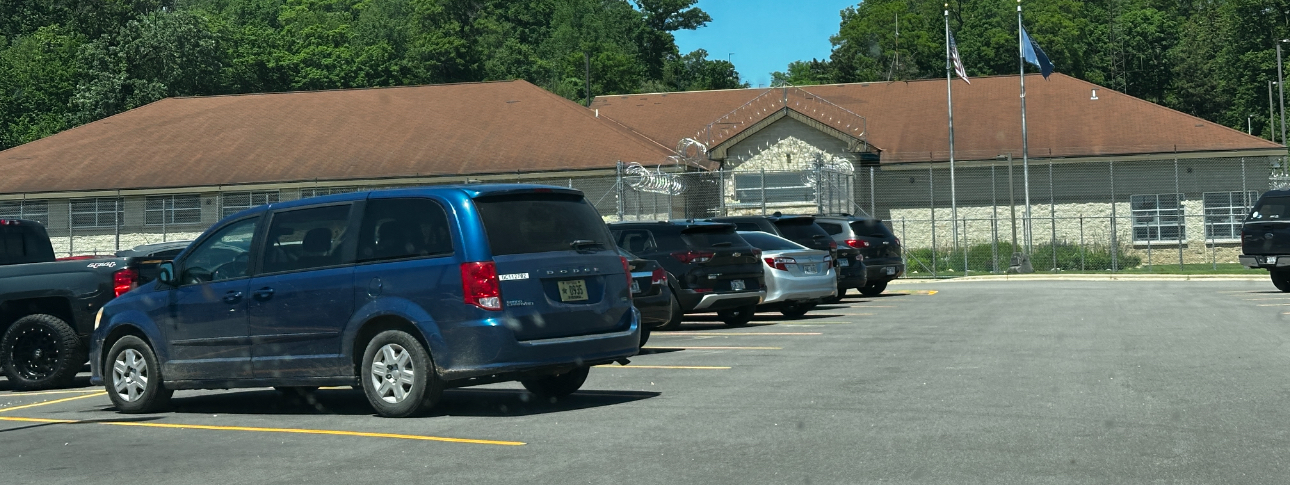
- OCI pictured in May 2024 (as seen from the parking lot)
- Interactive map of Oakhill Correctional Institution
- Location: Oregon, Wisconsin
- Status: Operational
- Security class: Minimum
- Capacity: 344
- Population: 832 (FY 2025)
- Opened: 1976
- Managed by: Wisconsin Department of Corrections; Division of Adult Institutions
- Warden: Wayne Olson

The Oakhill Correctional Institution is a minimum-security Wisconsin Department of Corrections prison for males located in Oregon, Wisconsin in the United States. The prison encompasses approximately 160 acres.

== History ==
The building that the prison is housed in was built in 1931, but remained vacant for 10 years until it became the Oregon School For Girls. In 1976, the school was closed and converted into the Oakhill Correctional Institution. The facility is listed on the National Register of Historic Places.

== See also ==
- List of Wisconsin state prisons
