= Robert Whitney Burns =

United States Air Force general (1908–1964)

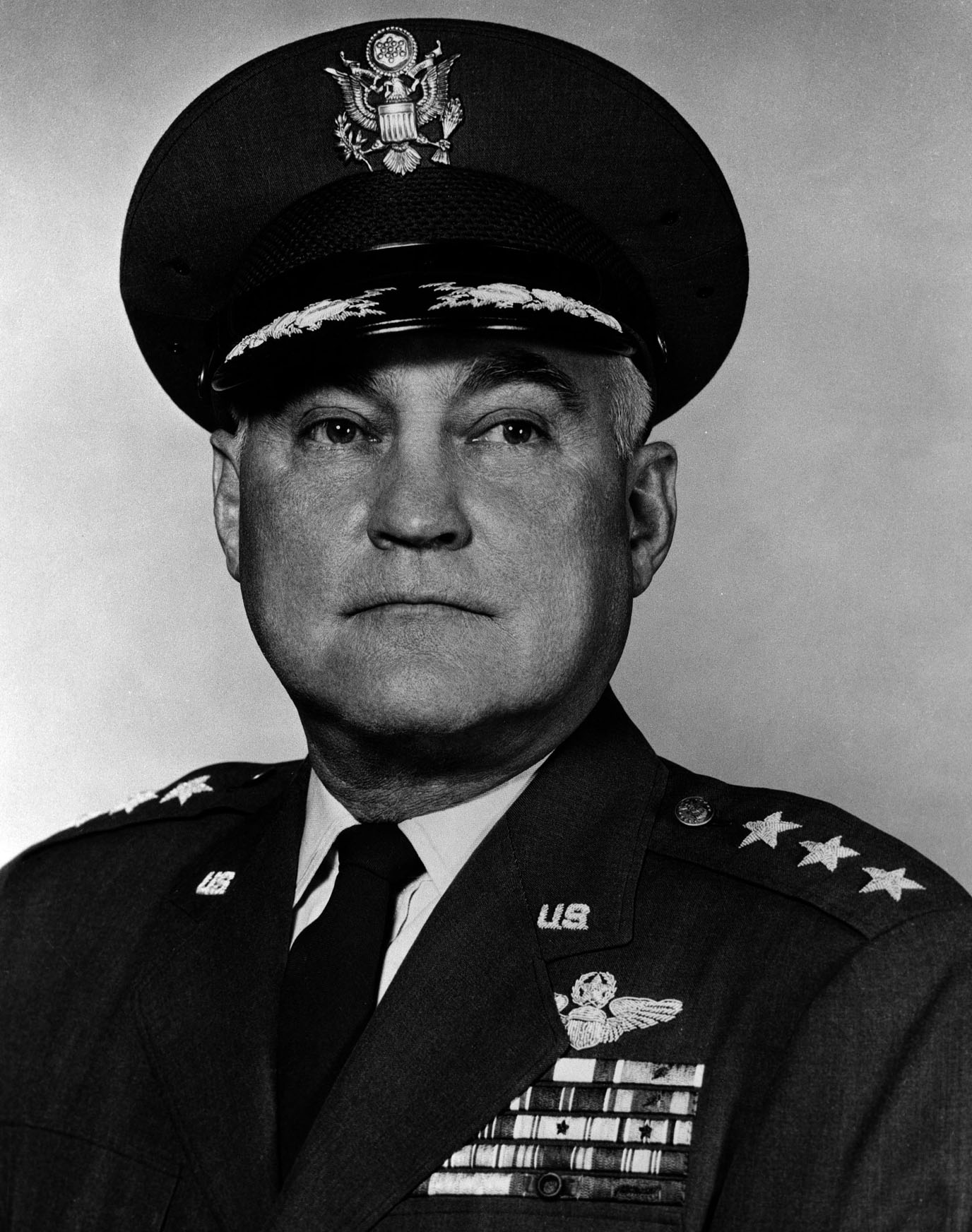
- Born: September 15, 1908; Stanley, Wisconsin, US
- Died: September 15, 1964 (aged 56); San Antonio, Texas, US
- Burial place: Arlington National Cemetery
- Military career
- Allegiance: United States
- Branch: United States Air Force
- Service years: 1928–1964
- Rank: Lieutenant general
- Commands: Fifth Air Force; U.S. Forces Japan; Air Training Command

Robert Whitney Burns (September 15, 1908 – September 5, 1964) was a lieutenant general in the United States Air Force who commanded the Air Training Command from August 1, 1963, to August 10, 1964.

== Biography ==
Burns was born in 1908 in Stanley, Wisconsin. He attended what is now the University of Wisconsin-Madison. Burns died in 1964 in San Antonio, Texas, of a short illness, shortly after his retirement. He is buried with his wife, Caroline, at Arlington National Cemetery. Caroline was the daughter of Medal of Honor recipient Archie Miller and granddaughter of Brigadier General Samuel Whitside, both of whom are also buried at Arlington.

== Career ==
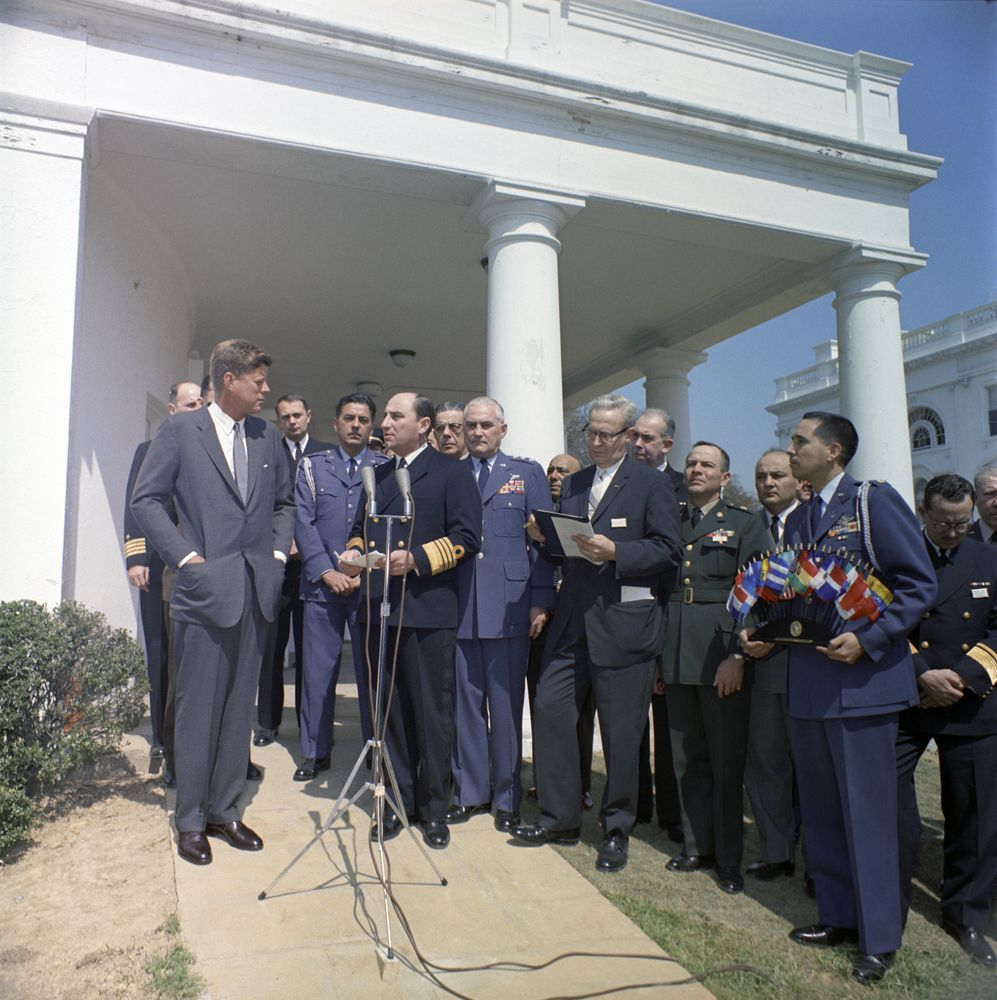
Burns chaired the Inter-American Defense Board when delegates met at the White House with President John F. Kennedy, on the occasion of the board's 20th anniversary (1962)

Burns joined the United States Army Air Corps in 1928. First he was assigned to the 17th Pursuit Squadron. In 1932 he was reassigned to the 19th Pursuit Squadron. Later he would be assigned to tours of duty at Crissy Field and Randolph Air Force Base. In 1940, he was a member of the Air Corps Military Mission to Chile, returning to the US in 1942. In 1943, he was sent to England, and the following year became Assistant Chief of Staff for Operations of the VIII Fighter Command. Later in 1944, he became director of operations of the Eighth Air Force. In the final months of the war his commands included the 4th and 14th Bombardment Wings. Burns would become Assistant Vice Chief of Staff of the Air Force in 1953 and take command of the Fifth Air Force and U.S. Forces Japan in 1958. In 1961 Burns would become Chairman of the Inter-American Defense Board. While serving the assignment he was also assigned as senior Air Force member of the Military Staff Committee. In 1963 he was assigned as commanding officer of Air Training Command. A year later Burns would retire, effective as of August 10.

Awards he received include the Distinguished Service Medal, the Legion of Merit with two oak leaf clusters, the Distinguished Flying Cross, the Bronze Star Medal, the Air Medal with oak leaf cluster, the Commendation Medal, the Croix de Guerre, and the Order of the Merit of Chile (First Class). Burns was also a member of the Order of the British Empire.
