= Green Bay Correctional Institution =

Prison in Green Bay, Wisconsin, USA

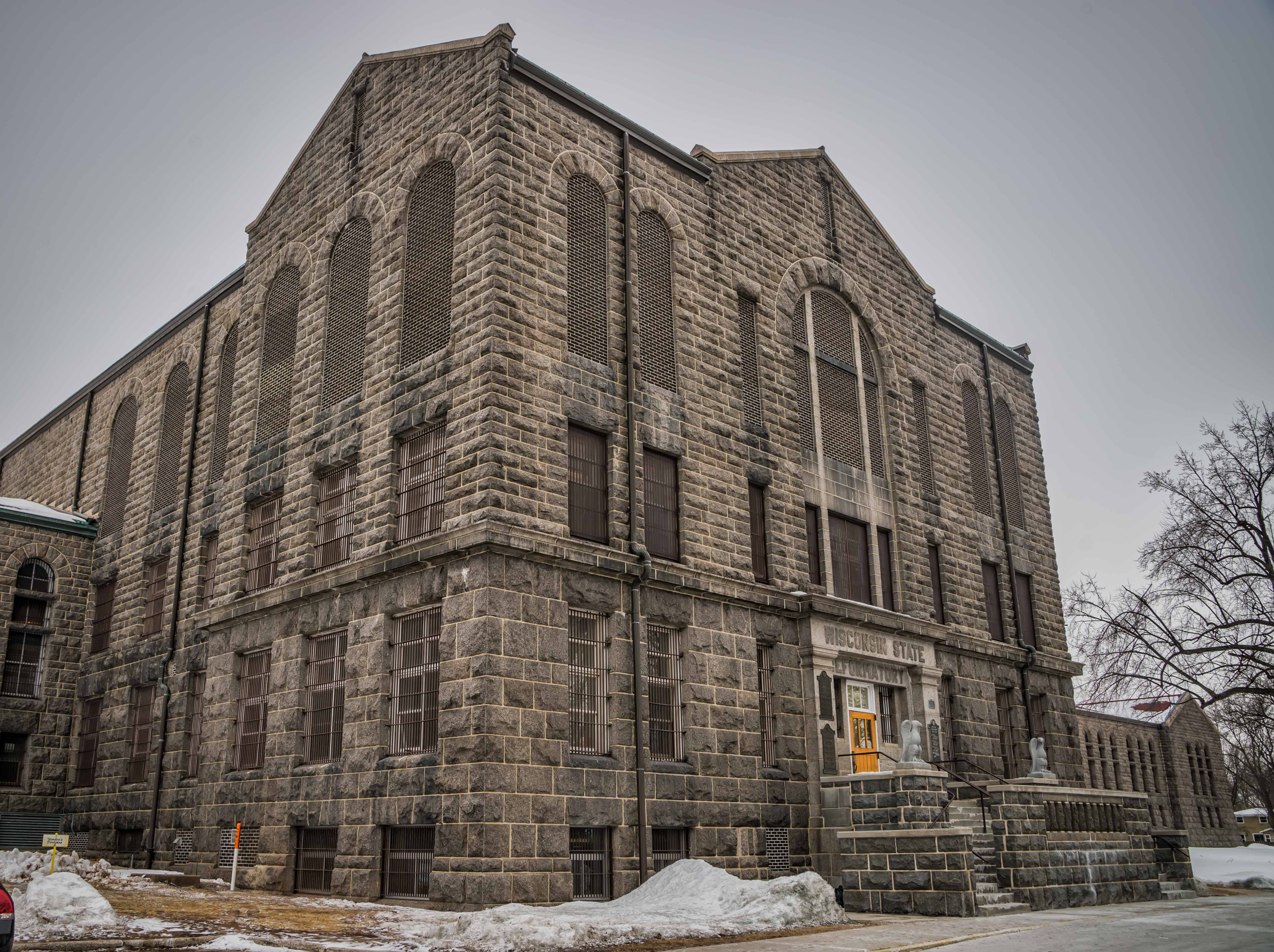
- Interactive map of Green Bay Correctional Institution
- Location: Green Bay, Wisconsin, U.S.; 44.471°N 88.038°W
- Status: Operational
- Security class: Maximum
- Capacity: 749 males (operating)
- Population: 1,008 males (08/14/2020)
- Opened: August 31, 1898
- Managed by: Wisconsin Department of Corrections
- Director: Christopher Stevens
- Wisconsin State Reformatory
- U.S. National Register of Historic Places
- U.S. Historic district
- Location within Wisconsin Location within the United States
- Location: SE corner of Riverside Dr. and SR 172, Allouez, Wisconsin
- Area: 29 acres (11.7 ha)
- Architect: Ferry & Clas
- Architectural style: Italianate, Romanesque
- NRHP reference No.: 90000641

Green Bay Correctional Institution (GBCI) is an adult male maximum-security correctional facility operated by the Wisconsin Department of Corrections Division of Adult Institutions in Allouez, Wisconsin. The prison is located along the east bank of the Fox River.

== History ==
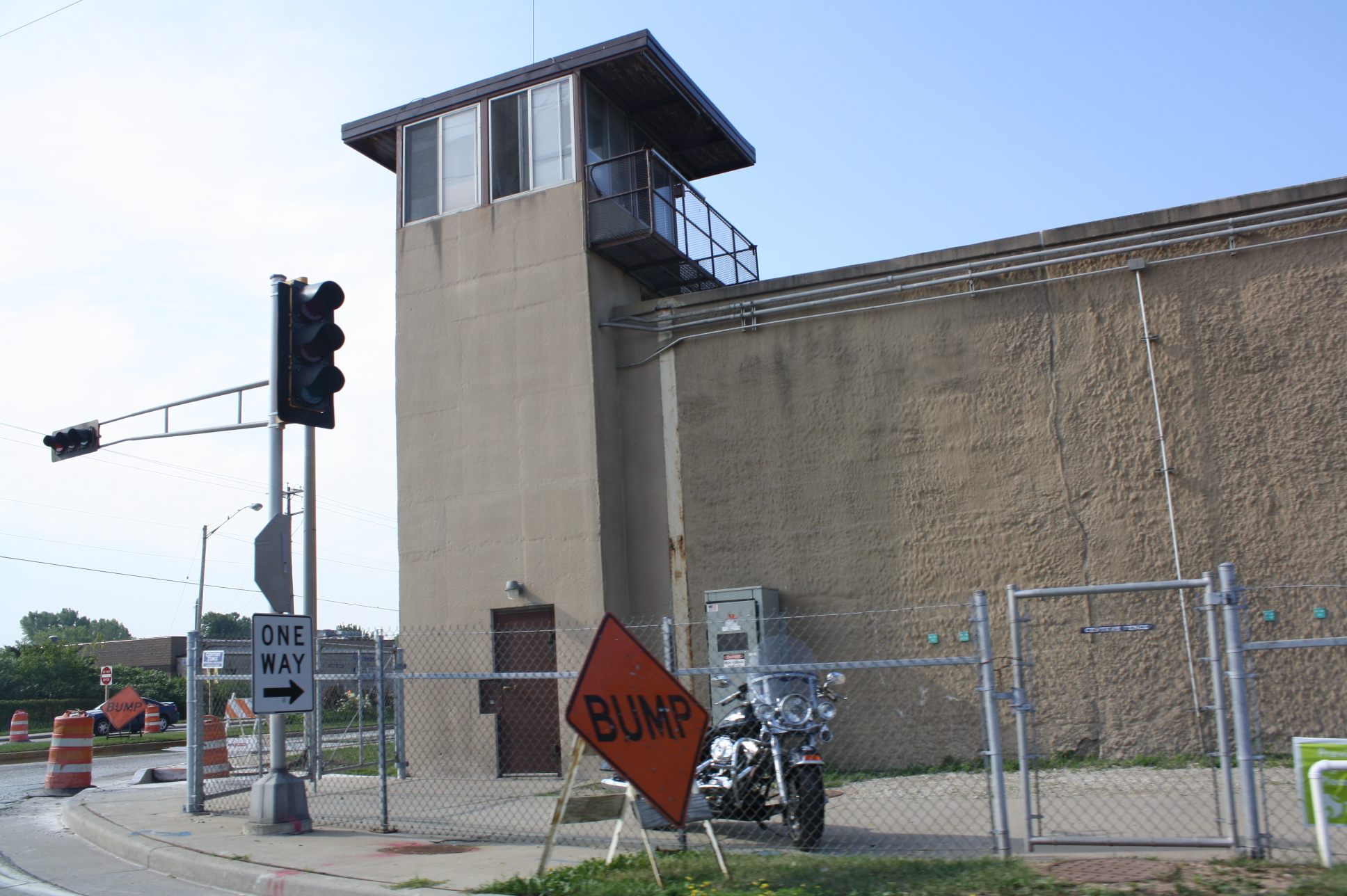
Watchtower

The prison was originally known as the "Wisconsin State Reformatory" (WSR). In 1972, WSR became an adult male, maximum-security prison. The name was changed to the Green Bay Correctional Institution on July 1, 1979.

The prison was listed on the National Register of Historic Places as the "Wisconsin State Reformatory" in 1990.

In 2022, the United States Court of Appeals for the Seventh Circuit invoked the Religious Land Use and Institutionalized Persons Act in its ruling that the rights of a Muslim prisoner at Green Bay Correctional Institution were unlawfully violated when he was strip searched by a transgender male guard.

== See also ==
- List of Wisconsin state prisons
