= Murder of Shauna Howe =

Kidnap and murder of a child

Shauna Howe
- Born: July 11, 1981; United States
- Died: October 27, 1992 (aged 11); Rockland Township, Venango County, Pennsylvania, U.S.
- Cause of death: Blunt force trauma
- Known for: Child murder victim

Shauna Melinda Howe (July 11, 1981 – October 27, 1992) was an 11-year-old girl from Oil City, Pennsylvania, who was raped and murdered on October 27, 1992. Howe was then thrown off a bridge. Pennsylvania received widespread media attention for over a decade. In September and October 2005, Eldred "Ted" Walker, James O'Brien, and Timothy O'Brien were convicted for participation in Howe's murder.

== Background ==
Around 8pm on October 27, Howe was walking home from a Girl Scouts Halloween party in Oil City, Pennsylvania, when she was abducted at the corner of West First Street and Reed Street, two blocks from home. A local resident, Dan Paden, witnessed the kidnapping, providing investigators with details of the circumstances, the abductor and the getaway vehicle used.

== Investigation ==
The mystery of Howe's disappearance and murder continued for nearly ten years until the investigation had a major breakthrough. In 2002, a DNA sample taken from Oil City resident James O'Brien matched a sample of DNA found on Howe's body. The DNA revelation intensified the investigation, with increased presence in the area by the FBI and the Pennsylvania State Police, with the latter searching the home of Eldred "Ted" Walker, who said he may have opened his home to some "really bad" people once who may have done "a disgusting thing."

== Trial ==
In September 2005, Walker, as part of a plea bargain, pleaded guilty to kidnapping and third-degree murder and agreed to testify against the O'Brien brothers. In court, he admitted grabbing Howe and passing her to the O'Briens who were waiting in a parked car. He also admitted knowing the brothers were upstairs in his house with the girl as he heard her crying. Walker was sentenced to 40-years in prison and the O'Brien brothers were found guilty of several charges, with each receiving a sentence of life without the possibility of parole. In 2022, Walker died in prison. He would have been eligible for parole in 2024.

== Legacy ==
Following Howe's murder, the Oil City Council voted to prohibit night-time trick-or-treating. The ban remained in place for 15 years, before being lifted in time for Halloween 2008.

== See also ==
- List of kidnappings
- Lists of solved missing person cases
- Murder of Lisa Ann French — another Halloween murder
