= Clarence B. Culbertson =

American lawyer and politician (1869–1951)

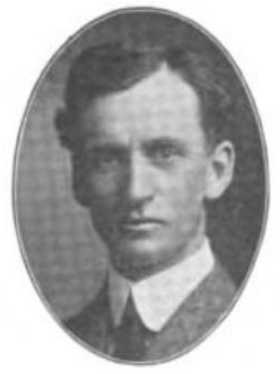

Member of the Wisconsin State Assembly
- In office 1908–1910
- Constituency: Chippewa County First District

Personal details
- Born: Clarence Barker Culbertson; October 17, 1869 Edinboro, Pennsylvania
- Died: January 29, 1951 (aged 81) Marshfield, Wisconsin
- Party: Republican
- Occupation: Lawyer, politician

Clarence Barker Culbertson (October 17, 1869 – January 29, 1951) was an American lawyer and politician.

Born in Edinboro, Pennsylvania, Culbertson moved with his parents to Augusta, Wisconsin. Culbertson went to University of Wisconsin and then received his law degree from University of Wisconsin Law School in 1894. He practiced law in Stanley, Wisconsin and served as Stanley city attorney. He served as district attorney of Chippewa County, Wisconsin and on the Chippewa County Board of Supervisors. In 1909, Culbertson served in the Wisconsin State Assembly as a Republican. Culbertson died in a hospital in Marshfield, Wisconsin.
