= Murder of Lisa Ann French =

1973 rape and murder of a 9-year-old girl in Fond du Lac, Wisconsin

Lisa Ann French
- French in 1972
- Born: June 2, 1964; Oshkosh, Wisconsin, U.S.
- Died: October 31, 1973 (aged 9); Fond du Lac, Wisconsin, U.S.
- Cause of death: Asphyxiation and/or shock
- Body discovered: Taycheedah, Wisconsin, U.S.
- Burial place: Estabrook Cemetery
- Education: Chegwin Elementary School

Lisa Ann French (June 2, 1964 – October 31, 1973) was a 9-year-old girl from Fond du Lac, Wisconsin, who was sexually assaulted and murdered by her neighbor, Gerald Miles Turner Jr. (born June 9, 1949) (later nicknamed "The Halloween Killer"), on Halloween night 1973, while she was trick-or-treating alone.

French was out Trick-or-Treating alone near her home on her way to a neighborhood Halloween party. Turner lured her into his home before sexually assaulting and killing her, then concealing her corpse in a garbage bag and later discarding her body in a farm field in the town of Taycheedah, Wisconsin. Turner confessed to the murder nine months later, and was originally sentenced to 38 years and 6 months for his crimes. He was mandatorily released on parole in 1992 and 1998, but sent back to prison in 2003 for 15 years and 6 months for violating his parole. The murder sent shockwaves through the local community of Fond du Lac and the state of Wisconsin, causing more stringent daylight trick-or-treating hours in Wisconsin communities and inspiring the creation of Wisconsin Chapter 980, enacted in 1994 and nicknamed "Turner's Law," which allows criminals who have been released from their prison sentences to be detained in mental health facilities if they are deemed sexually violent persons and dangerous to the public.

== Background ==
Lisa Ann French was born on June 2, 1964, in Oshkosh, Wisconsin to parents Allan French and Maryann Borkovich Gehring. She lived in Fond du Lac, Wisconsin, with her mother, her baby brother Michael, and their soon to be stepfather Bruce DePauw, a half-block away from where Turner lived. French was a fourth grader at Chegwin Elementary School and a member of the Girl Scouts.

At the time of French's death, Turner lived with his girlfriend, Arlene Penn, and their infant child. French and Turner knew each other before the incident; French often spent time with Turner and Penn's infant and had regular conversations with Turner. Turner had previously shared a rented side of a duplex with French's family. Prior to the murder, Turner had not been convicted of any major sex offenses. Turner had previously sexually molested a 15-year-old babysitter but was never accused before the murder of French.

== Night of the murder ==
French left her home at around 5:45 p.m. dressed as a hobo, wearing a black felt hat, a green parka, jeans with blue masking tape, and dotted freckles on her cheeks. French originally intended to be accompanied by a friend, Ann Parker, on her way to an outdoor Halloween party at Pumpkin Place on East Bank Street. Parker, however, had been grounded, so she had to stay home, leaving French to trick-or-treat by herself. It was reported that French stopped for candy at a classmate's house and the house of one of her teachers, Karen Bauknecht, before she made her way to Turner's residence.

According to Turner's confession, French rang his doorbell, said "trick-or-treat", and walked through his open doorway with her candy bag open as Turner came to the door. Turner and French began to talk about candy and at some point Turner lured French into his bedroom, where he sexually assaulted and murdered her. Turner said that after the sexual assault French wasn't breathing; he attempted to revive her but was interrupted when Arlene Penn arrived home.

Penn, who had been at the party French was supposed to attend, said that she arrived home around 7 p.m. Turner was wearing a bathrobe and claimed multiple times that he was "sick." Penn said that Turner made several trips to the bedroom to lie down; in Turner's confession, he said that French's body was, at that time, in the adjacent bathroom.

After Penn left the residence at around 8:00 p.m. to visit her mother, Turner stuffed French's body and clothes into separate bags and drove her body to Taycheedah, Wisconsin, where he discarded her corpse in a farm field off McCabe Road. In an effort to avoid leaving evidence of fingerprints on French's body or at the crime scene, Turner wore socks on his hands when moving the body. He also wiped down French's shoes and the zipper of her parka.

French's mother, Maryann Gehrig, started to grow worried about French's whereabouts when she did not return home for her 7:00 p.m. curfew. By 10:00 p.m., a search party had formed and begun looking for the young girl.

== Discovery, investigation and first trial ==
A three-day, county-wide search for the missing girl was conducted which included over 5,000 volunteers, 700 block parents, auxiliary police officers, The United States National Guard and some of her fellow Girl Scouts. A farmer named Gerald Braun was returning home in his tractor in Taycheedah on November 3, 1973, at 11:30 a.m., when he discovered two brown plastic bags behind a barbed wire fence near a forest on McCabe road, one containing French's naked corpse, the other containing the clothing from her halloween costume. An autopsy performed on French's body had revealed that French had died from asphyxiation though a pathologist had also stated she had died from circulatory shock from the sexual trauma that she endured. French's funeral was held on November 6, 1973, at Immanuel-Trinity Lutheran Church in Fond du Lac, the Revs. Paul G. Piotter and Harold G. Kromrey officiating. On November 8, 1973, The chamber of commerce of Fond du Lac had posted a ten thousand dollar reward for the capture of Lisa Ann French's killer.

Turner was made a suspect of the murder early in the investigation by Fond du Lac law enforcement, but it took nine months of questioning and testing until he confessed nine months later on August 8, 1974, to the rape and murder of French. During the nine months of scrutiny from police, he was brought in by law enforcement to perform a polygraph exam; the results of the exam came back inconclusive and Turner declined to participate in a second exam. Police had also collected body hair and bedspread fiber samples from Turner, which were positively matched to samples on French's body and her clothing. Turner in his 1974 confession had stated that when he saw French in his doorway he was "highly sexually motivated"; he said he then proceeded to lead her into his bedroom where he undressed French and then performed anal intercourse on her. Turner then said that he noticed that French had stopped breathing after the sexual assault and he put his head over her chest and noticed that her heart was still beating and attempted to revive her by placing his hands over her chest and then listening to her chest again until he said Penn had driven up to the house. Gerald Turner was subsequently taken into police custody on August 9, 1974, and was convicted on February 4, 1975, by a jury on the charges of second degree murder, enticing a child for immoral purposes and acts of sexual perversion and was sentenced to 38 years and 6 months in prison.

== Turner's parole releases ==
Turner was first paroled on October 13, 1992, for "good behavior" after only serving 17 years and 8 months of his sentence in Waupun Correctional Institution. Turner's 1992 parole sparked multiple community protests and public outrage among French's relatives and residents of Milwaukee, which was where he was living at in a halfway house during his first parole. This prompted lawmakers to create the sexual predator law Wisconsin Chapter 980 nicknamed "Turner's law", which was ratified on May 26, 1994, by Wisconsin governor, Tommy Thompson. This law allows criminals who have been paroled or released from their prison sentences to be detained in mental institutions if they are deemed to have a "substantial probability" of committing another crime. Turner was sent back to prison on November 23, 1993, after a Department of Corrections' appeal ruled that they had miscalculated his mandatory parole release from his good behavior.

On January 29, 1998, after a four-day trial, a jury on Turner's parole hearing ruled that Turner was not a violent sexual predator, meaning that he could not be held at a treatment center under "Turner's law" and could begin his mandatory second parole that year. In July 1998, a Judge ruled against an unsuccessful attempt to revoke his parole after a June incident in which Turner had shouted and waved a butcher knife at his caseworker while at his halfway home, although a psychiatrist ruled him to still be a dangerous individual. Turner had filed a complaint on the Waste Management of Madison for the company refusing hiring him due to his criminal record. Turner and the company reached an undisclosed settlement where they were required to hire Turner due to a former Wisconsin law not allowing companies to consider criminal convictions when hiring former felons unless the crime is "substantially related" to the applying job which the Waste Management company argued that he could not be hired since they had 15 tours with children during the previous school year and that he would have access to dangerous materials and chemicals. Following Turner's complaint against the waste company, the Wisconsin State Assembly passed a bill on October 28, 1999, in a vote of 63–33, which repealed the original law that prohibited job discrimination based on a felon's criminal record, meaning that employers could then rightfully refuse to hire convicted felons on the basis of their criminal record without further complaints. Turner was returned to prison for 15 additional years after violating his parole in 2003, when an abundance of pornographic content was discovered in his possession.

Turner, in an undated letter he wrote to French after her death, depicted the events that took place during their encounter: "I doubt that I could ever fully realize the terror you experienced at my hands, I can still see you standing the doorway with that felt hat beaming at having recognized me. Then I see the delight in your eyes turn to fear as I close the door behind you." "The rest of my life I will have to live with what I did to you." "On that night I became a monster. ... I do swear to you on the forfeiture of my life I will never harm another child." Turner had at one time suggested that due to him committing the crimes on Halloween, he had receive more significance for the crime and his case once quoting, "If it had happened on some other day, like Valentine's Day, nobody would have gave a damn."

== Turner's prison release and detainment ==
After being returned to prison to serve 15 1/2 years for violating his parole in 2003, Turner was scheduled to be mandatorily released fully from his extended prison sentence at Racine Correctional Institution without any parole restrictions on February 1, 2018. Turner's impending release caused Lisa Ann French's mother to create an online petition in an effort to keep Turner incarcerated in a mental treatment facility. As of 2021, The petition has received over 34,000 signatures with over 9,000 signatures from Wisconsin residents. The Wisconsin Department of Justice filed a legal petition on January 26, 2018, prior to his mandatory prison release, to make the case that Turner should be detained under Wisconsin Chapter 980. Turner was then transported to a facility in Juneau County temporarily, while awaiting a scheduled hearing on April 6, 2018, to determine if Turner was a violent sex offender and could be held at a treatment facility permanently.

The scheduled April 6 hearing was postponed following circuit court judge Robert Wirtz ordering a transfer of the proceedings from its original setting of Fond du Lac County to Dane County, Wisconsin. This move was a result of Turner's defense attorney persuading Wirtz to move the hearing by arguing that Turner had lived in a Madison halfway home during his second parole before he was sent back to prison. Wisconsin's Department of Justice then proceeded to appeal the circuit judge's decision to move the case to Dane County as the Department of Justice argued that the hearing should take place where the crime occurred. As the intervals between each hearing lengthened, a spokesperson for the Department of Justice stated that there was no timeline for when a final decision on Turner's status was to be made, as Turner had currently remained at Sand Ridge Secure Treatment Center in Mauston, Wisconsin. In 2019, a Wisconsin appellate court irrevocably ruled that Turner was to be tried again in Fond du Lac County, overriding the circuit court judge's decision and ruling he had to be tried in Fond du Lac County. The proceedings, however, were postponed again partly because of the COVID-19 pandemic. It was most recently reported that Turner was set to have his status tried again in court on October 29, 2020, two days before the 47th anniversary of the murder of French.

On February 23, 2022, Judge Paul Czisny ultimately denied Turner's release, ruling to condemn Turner to residency at a high security mental health facility.

== See also ==
- List of homicides in Wisconsin
- List of kidnappings
- List of murdered American children
- List of solved missing person cases: 1950–1999
- Murder of Shauna Howe — another Halloween murder
