= Joseph Henderson (Medal of Honor) =

American military officer

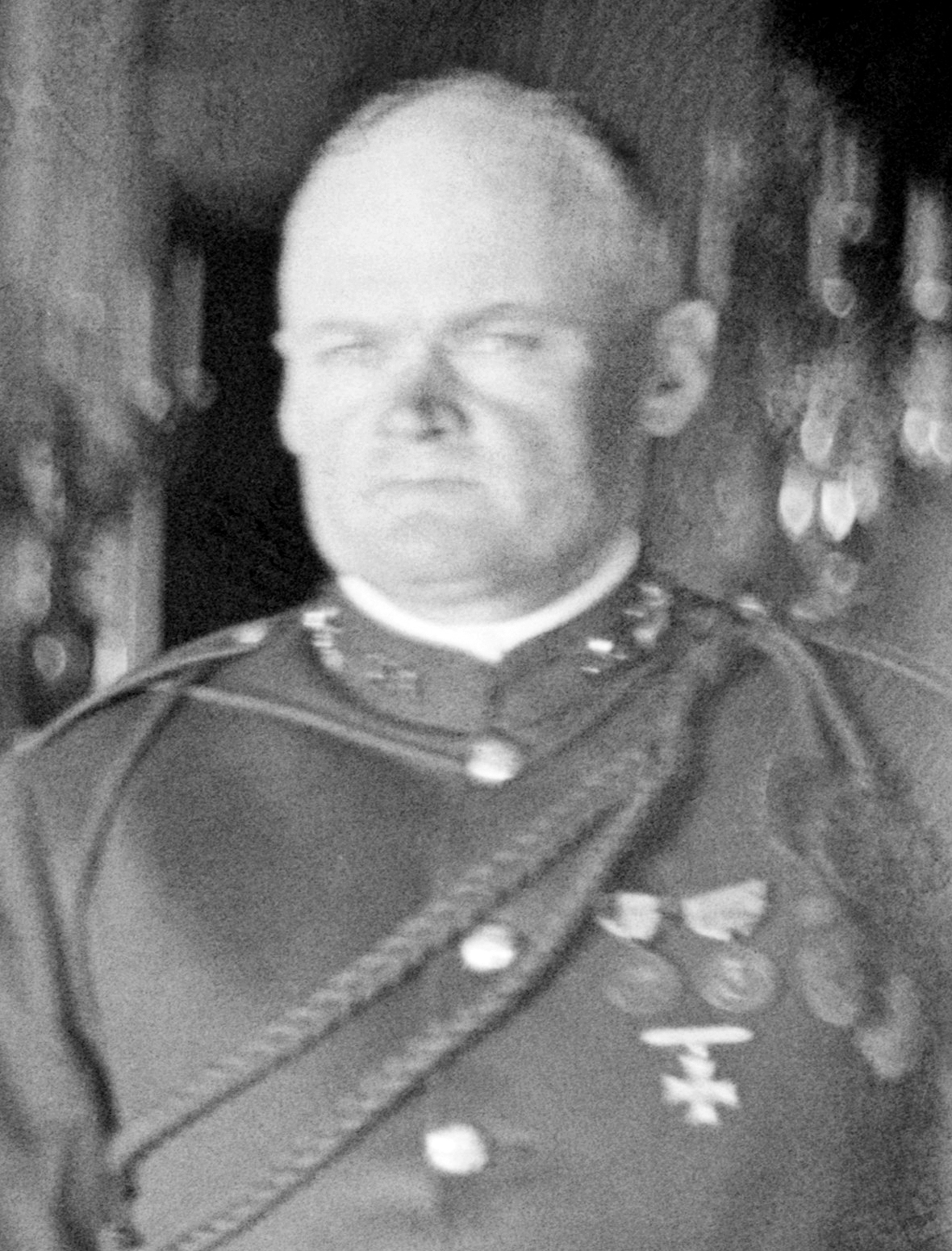
- Henderson at the Medal of Honor presentation ceremony at the White House (November 23, 1912)
- Born: December 22, 1869; Fort Leavenworth, Kansas
- Died: December 19, 1938 (aged 68); Fort Leavenworth, Kansas
- Burial place: Arlington National Cemetery
- Military career
- Allegiance: United States
- Branch: United States Army
- Service years: 1899-1924
- Rank: Master Sergeant
- Unit: U.S. 6th Cavalry Regiment.
- Conflicts: Boxer Rebellion; Moro Rebellion; Philippine–American War
- Awards: Medal of Honor

Joseph Henderson (December 1869 – December 19, 1938) was a United States Army Sergeant who received the Medal of Honor for actions during the Moro Uprising in 1909. He later obtained the rank of Master Sergeant. Sergeant Henderson was awarded his medal on 23 November 1912, for the same action as Lieutenant Archie Miller.

Henderson joined the army from Fort Leavenworth in March 1899 and retired on May 13, 1924.

== Medal of Honor citation ==
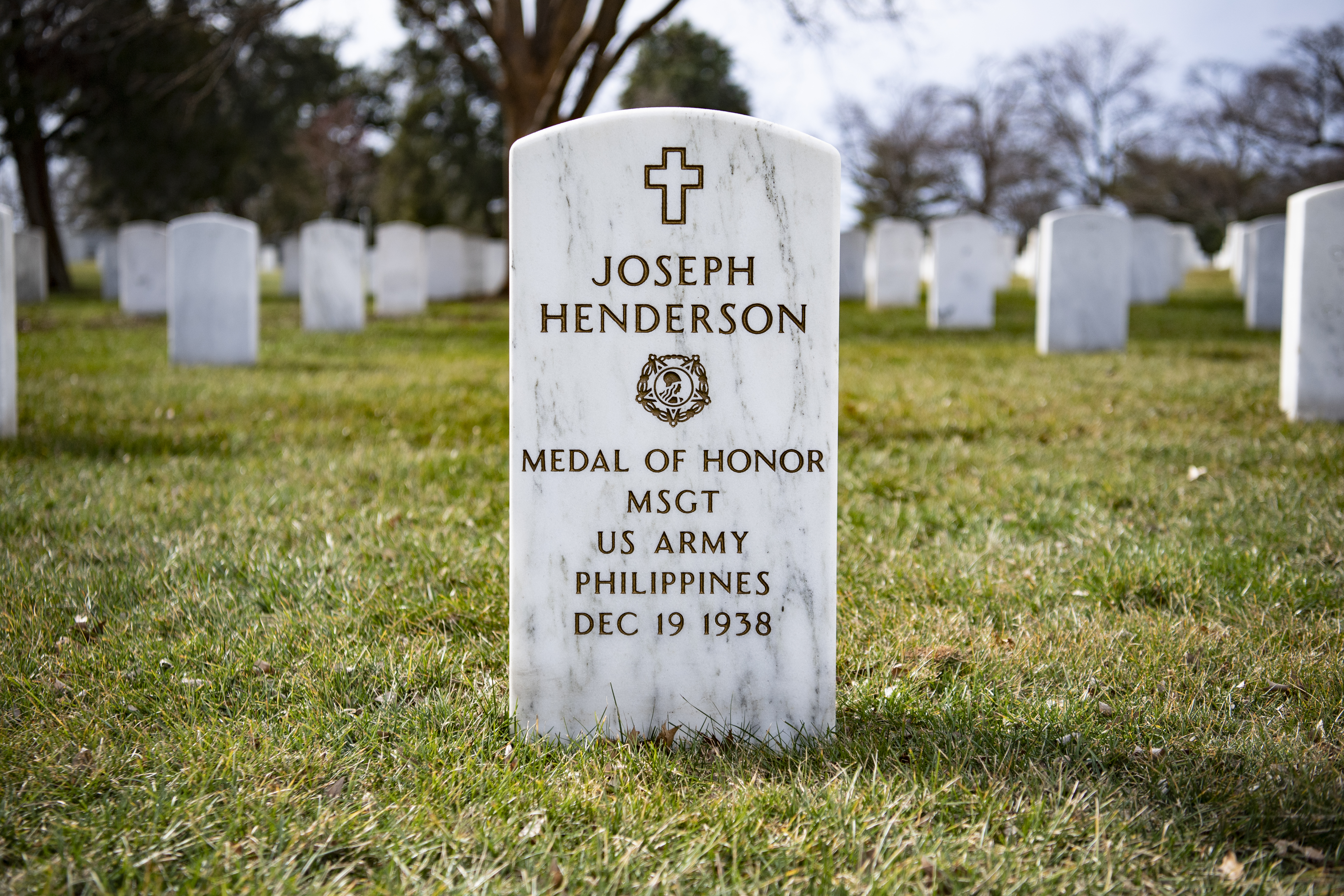
Grave at Arlington National Cemetery

Rank and organization: Sergeant, Troop B, 6th U.S. Cavalry. Place and date: At Patian Island, Philippine Islands, July 2, 1909. Entered service at: Leavenworth, Kans. Birth: Leavenworth, Kans. Date of issue: November 23, 1912.

Citation:

While in action against hostile Moros, voluntarily advanced alone, in the face of a heavy fire, to within about 15 yards of the hostile position and refastened to a tree a block and tackle used in checking the recoil of a mountain gun.

== See also ==
- List of Medal of Honor recipients
