= List of Wisconsin state prisons =

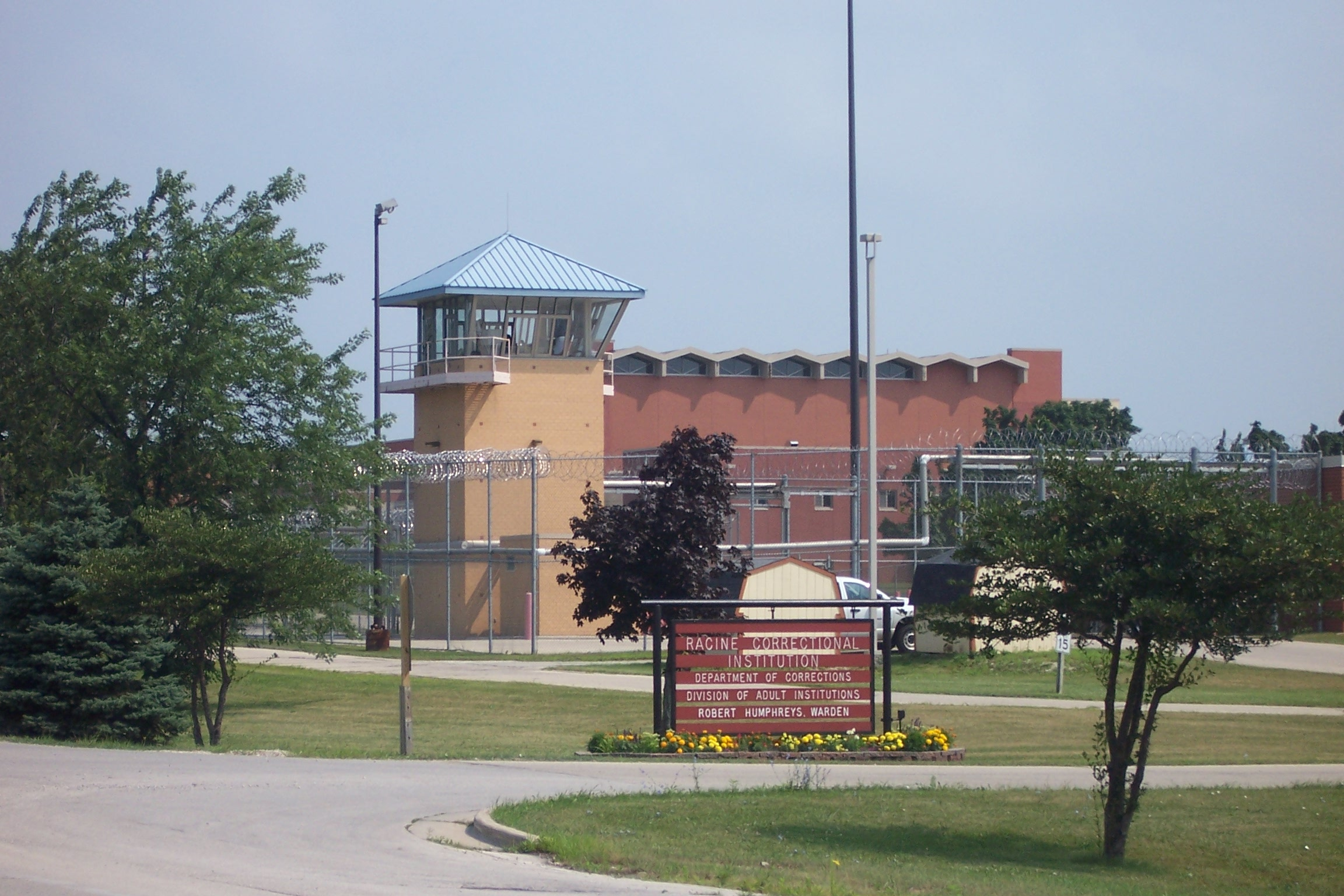
The Racine Correctional Institution, located in Sturtevant

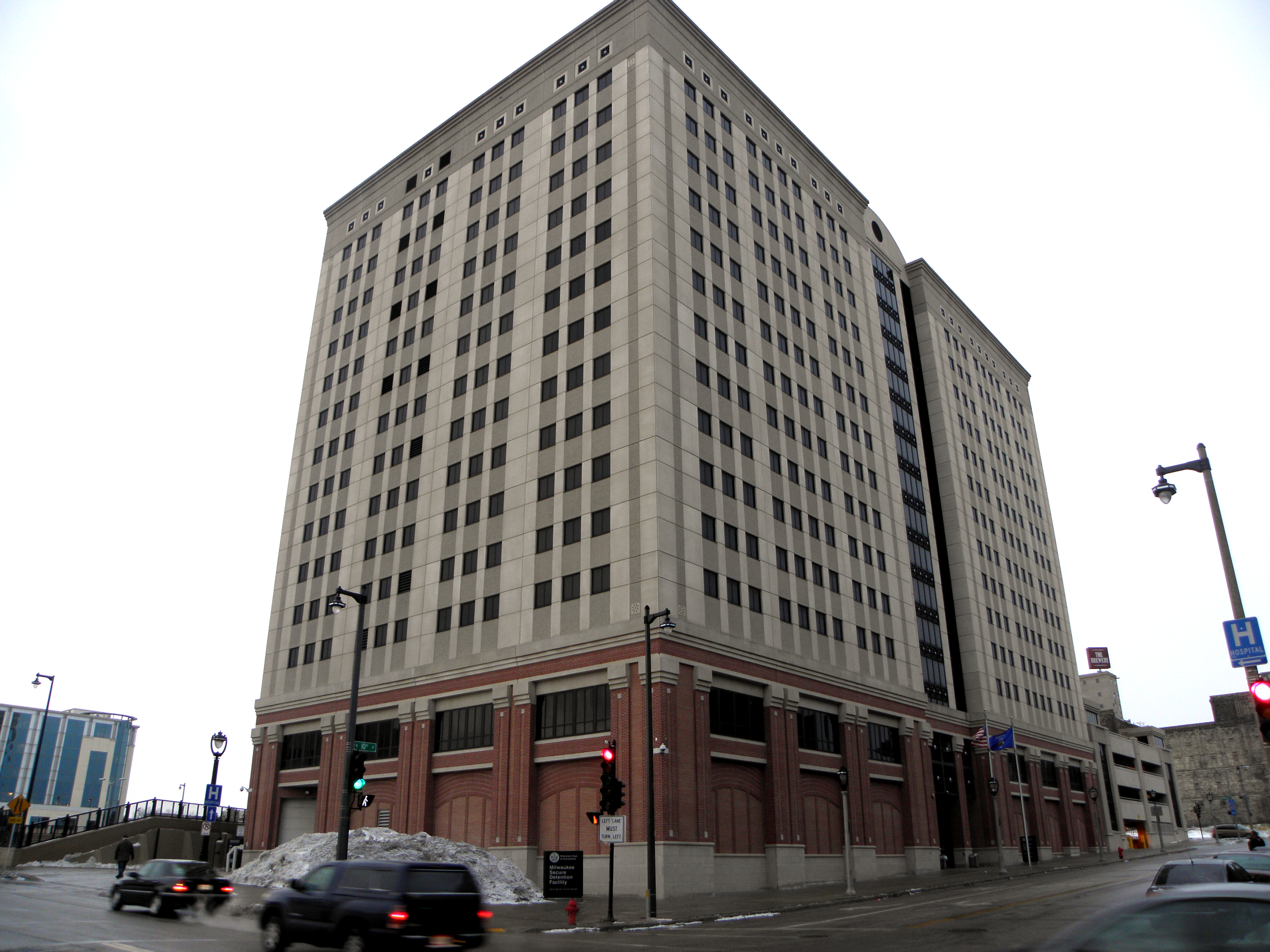
Milwaukee Secure Detention Facility

This is a list of state prisons in Wisconsin. It does not include federal prisons or county jails located in the state of Wisconsin.

== Prisons ==
- Chippewa Valley Correctional Treatment Facility (formerly Highview; inmate operating capacity 450)
- Columbia Correctional Institution (capacity 541)
- Dodge Correctional Institution
- Fox Lake Correctional Institution
- Green Bay Correctional Institution
- Jackson Correctional Institution (capacity 988)
- Kettle Moraine Correctional Institution
- Milwaukee Secure Detention Facility (capacity 1040)
- New Lisbon Correctional Institution (capacity 1010)
- Oakhill Correctional Institution (capacity 688)
- Oshkosh Correctional Institution
- Prairie du Chien Correctional Institution (capacity 424)
- Racine Correctional Institution (capacity 1798)
- Racine Youthful Offender Correctional Facility (capacity 927)
- Redgranite Correctional Institution
- Stanley Correctional Institution (capacity 1550)
- Sturtevant Transitional Facility (capacity 304)
- Taycheedah Correctional Institution (women's prison, capacity 898)
- Waupun Correctional Institution
- Wisconsin Secure Program Facility

== Correctional centers ==
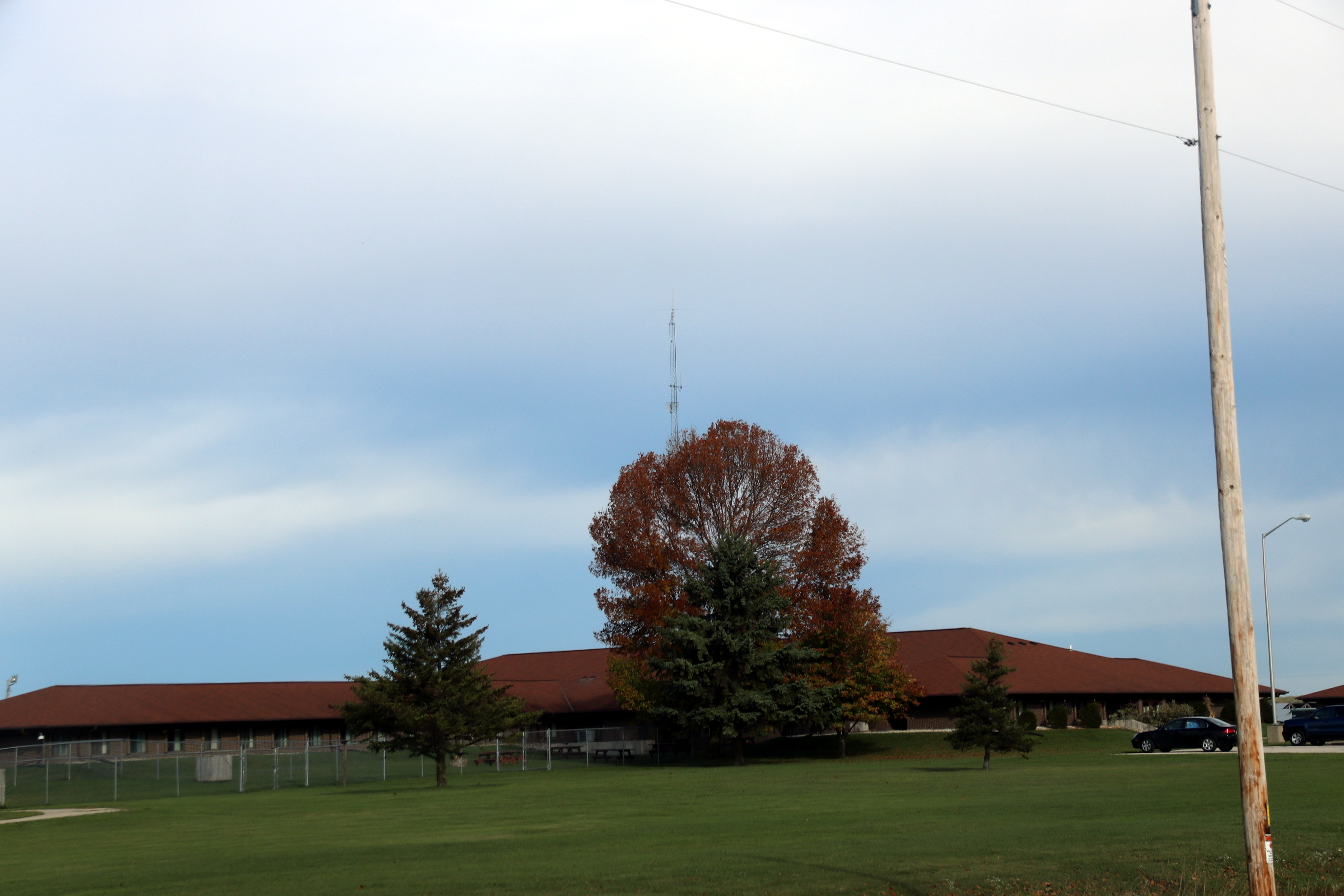
Sanger B. Powers Correctional Center in Outagamie County

The correctional centers system contains 16 relatively small minimum-security facilities, two of which house female inmates.

- Black River Correctional Center (capacity 114)
- Drug Abuse Correctional Center (capacity 300)
- Felmers O. Chaney Correctional Center (capacity 100)
- Flambeau Correctional Center (capacity 90)
- Gordon Correctional Center (capacity 90)
- John C. Burke Correctional Center (capacity 280)
- Kenosha Correctional Center (capacity 115)
- Marshall E. Sherrer Correctional Center (capacity 58)
- Milwaukee Women's Correctional Center (women's prison, capacity 112)
- McNaughton Correctional Center (capacity 102)
- Oregon Correctional Center (capacity 120)
- Robert E. Ellsworth Correctional Center (women's prison, capacity 333)
- Sanger B. Powers Correctional Center (capacity 70)
- St. Croix Correctional Center (capacity 120 male and 12 female)
- Thompson Correctional Center (capacity 120)
- Winnebago Correctional Center (capacity 250)
