= Racine Correctional Institution =

Prison in Racine County, Wisconsin

Coordinates: 42°42′36″N 87°54′03″W

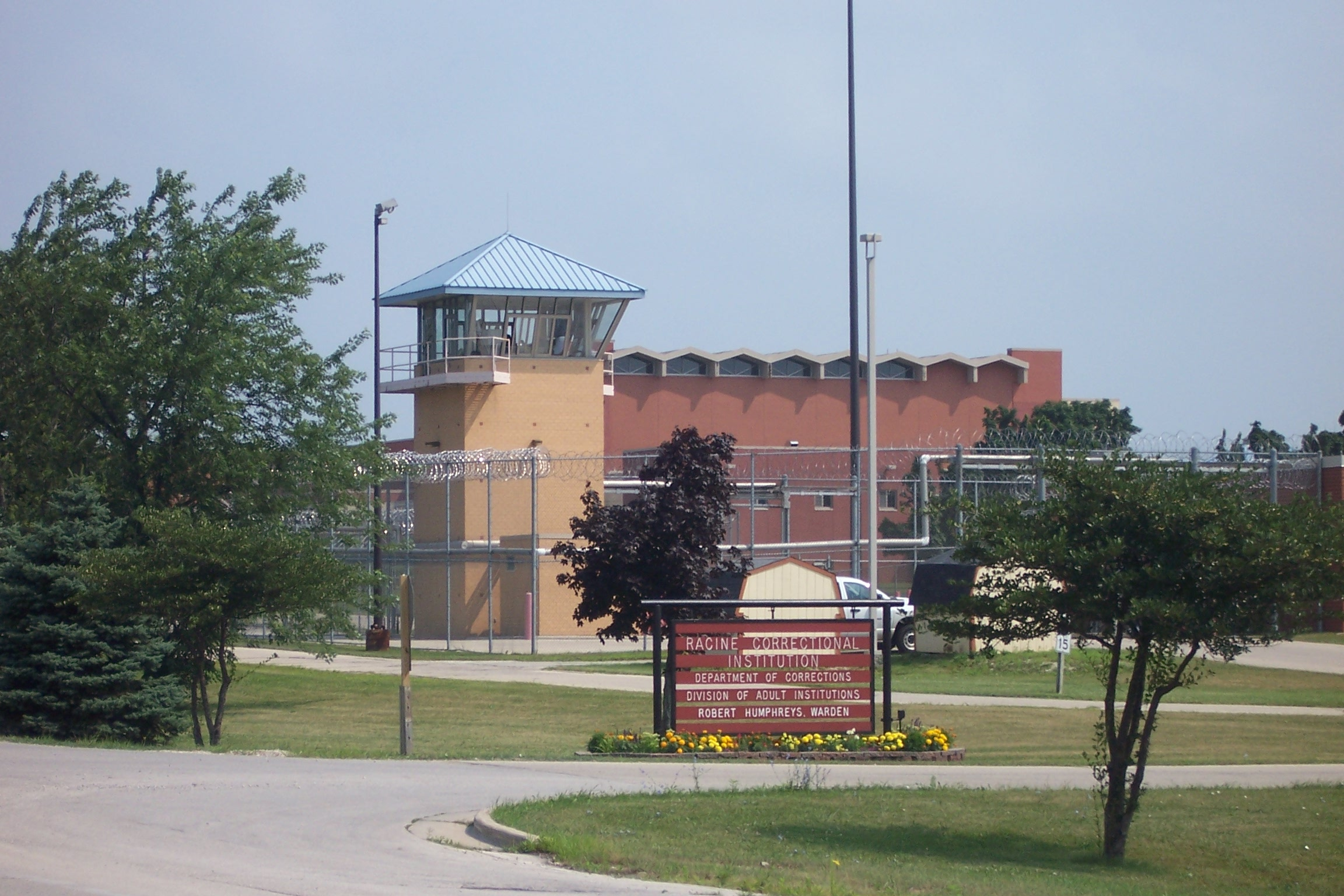
- Interactive map of Racine Correctional Institution
- Location: 2019 Wisconsin Street Sturtevant, Wisconsin
- Status: open
- Security class: medium
- Population: 1,610 (June 2023)
- Opened: 1991
- Managed by: Wisconsin Department of Corrections

The Racine Correctional Institution is a medium-security state prison for men located in Sturtevant, Racine County, Wisconsin, owned and operated by the Wisconsin Department of Corrections. The facility opened in 1991 and, as of June 2023, held 1,610 prisoners.

== Notable current and former inmates ==
- Gerald M. Turner (nicknamed "The Halloween Killer") - convicted of raping and murdering 9-year-old trick-or-treater, Lisa Ann French in 1973, released from Racine Correctional Institution in 2018.
- Joshua Ziminski - career criminal and participant in the Kenosha unrest shooting sentenced to 3 years for burglary and robbery with threat of force with charges related to the unrest dismissed.

== See also ==
- List of Wisconsin state prisons
