= Kettle Moraine Correctional Institution =

Medium-security prison in Wisconsin, United States

Coordinates: 43°43′03″N 88°09′02″W

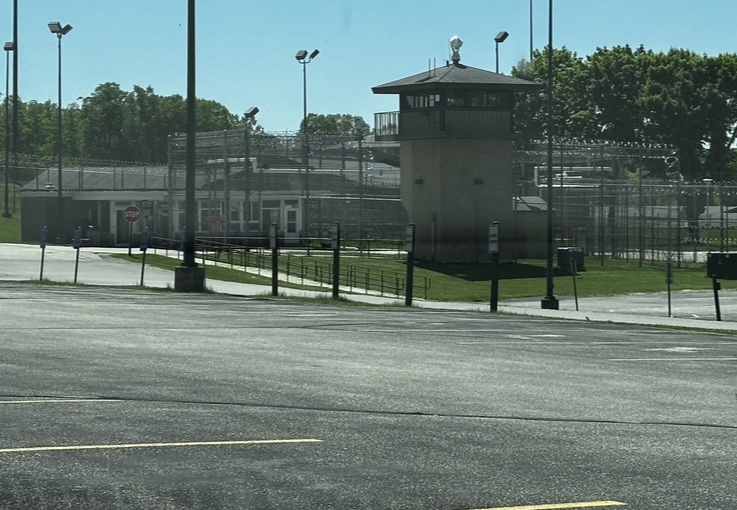
- KMCI in May 2024
- Interactive map of Kettle Moraine Correctional Institution
- Location: Town of Mitchell
- Status: Operational
- Security class: Medium
- Capacity: 1,187 males (operating)
- Population: 1,182 males (FY 2019)
- Opened: 1962
- Managed by: Wisconsin Department of Corrections; Division of Adult Institutions
- Director: Thomas Pollard
- Warden: Jon Noble

The Kettle Moraine Correctional Institution is a medium security prison located 10 miles west of Plymouth, Wisconsin in the unincorporated town of Greenbush. The facility is located off Wisconsin Highway 67 just east of the Sheboygan/Fond du Lac County line.

== History ==
The institution was opened in 1962 as the Wisconsin School for Boys, a juvenile facility. It was converted to an adult medium security prison in 1974 when Lincoln Hills School was expanded.

== See also ==
- List of Wisconsin state prisons
