= List of actors nominated for Academy Awards for performances of the disabled =

The following is a list of actors whose performances of characters with disabilities, impairments, and/or diseases were nominated for Academy Awards.

== Physical disability or disease ==
Ailment	Actor	Film	Character	Category	Year	Status
ALS (Lou Gehrig's Disease)	Gary Cooper	The Pride of the Yankees	Lou Gehrig	Best Lead Actor	1942	Nominated
ALS (Lou Gehrig's Disease)	Frances McDormand	North Country	Glory Dodge	Best Supporting Actress	2005	Nominated
ALS (Lou Gehrig's Disease)	Eddie Redmayne	The Theory of Everything	Stephen Hawking	Best Lead Actor	2014	Won
Amputee	Harold Russell	The Best Years of Our Lives	Petty Off. 2nd Class Homer Parrish	Best Supporting Actor	1946	Won
Amputee	Spencer Tracy	Bad Day at Black Rock	John J. Macreedy	Best Lead Actor	1955	Nominated
Amputee	Gary Sinise	Forrest Gump	Lt. Dan Taylor	Best Supporting Actor	1994	Nominated
Amputee	James Franco	127 Hours	Aron Ralston	Best Lead Actor	2010	Nominated
Amputee	Brian Tyree Henry	Causeway	James Aucoin	Best Supporting Actor	2022	Nominated
Aplastic Anemia	Melvyn Douglas	Being There	Ben Rand	Best Supporting Actor	1979	Won
Bedridden	Ethel Barrymore	The Spiral Staircase	Mrs. Warren	Best Supporting Actress	1946	Nominated
Blindness & Deafness	Patty Duke	The Miracle Worker	Helen Keller	Best Supporting Actress	1962	Won
Breast Cancer	Patricia Clarkson	Pieces of April	Joy Burns	Best Supporting Actress	2003	Nominated
Burn Victim	Faye Dunaway	Bonnie and Clyde	Bonnie Parker	Best Lead Actress	1967	Nominated
Burn Victim	Ralph Fiennes	The English Patient	László Almásy	Best Lead Actor	1996	Nominated
Cancer (Undisclosed)	Debra Winger	Terms of Endearment	Emma Greenway-Horton	Best Lead Actress	1983	Nominated
Cancer (Undisclosed)	Bill Nighy	Living	Rodney Williams	Best Lead Actor	2022	Nominated
Cardiovascular Disease	Austin Butler	Elvis	Elvis Presley	Best Lead Actor	2022	Nominated
Cerebral Palsy	Daniel Day-Lewis	My Left Foot	Christy Brown	Best Lead Actor	1989	Won
Chronic Pain	Antonio Banderas	Pain and Glory	Salvador Mallo	Best Lead Actor	2019	Nominated
Diabetes	Julia Roberts	Steel Magnolias	Shelby Eatenton-Latcherie	Best Supporting Actress	1989	Nominated
Dwarfism	Michael Dunn	Ship of Fools	Glocken	Best Supporting Actor	1965	Nominated
Dwarfism	Linda Hunt	The Year of Living Dangerously	Billy Kwan	Best Supporting Actress	1983	Won
Emphysema	Allison Janney	I, Tonya	LaVona Golden	Best Supporting Actress	2017	Won
Glioma	Bette Davis	Dark Victory	Judith Traherne	Best Lead Actress	1939	Nominated
Gout (Arthritis)	Olivia Colman	The Favourite	Queen Anne	Best Lead Actress	2018	Won
Hearing Loss	James Stewart	It's a Wonderful Life	George Bailey	Best Lead Actor	1946	Nominated
Hearing Loss	Jane Wyman	Johnny Belinda	Belinda MacDonald	Best Lead Actress	1948	Won
Hearing Loss	Ida Kamińska	The Shop on Main Street	Rozália Lautmannová	Best Lead Actress	1966	Nominated
Hearing Loss	Alan Arkin	The Heart Is a Lonely Hunter	John Singer	Best Lead Actor	1968	Nominated
Hearing Loss	John Mills	Ryan's Daughter	Michael	Best Supporting Actor	1970	Won
Hearing Loss	Marlee Matlin	Children of a Lesser God	Sarah Norman	Best Lead Actress	1986	Won
Hearing Loss	Rinko Kikuchi	Babel	Chieko Wataya	Best Supporting Actress	2006	Nominated
Hearing Loss	Riz Ahmed	Sound of Metal	Ruben Stone	Best Lead Actor	2020/ 2021	Nominated
Hearing Loss	Paul Raci	Sound of Metal	Joe	Best Supporting Actor	2020/ 2021	Nominated
Hearing Loss	Troy Kotsur	CODA	Frank Rossi	Best Supporting Actor	2021	Won
HIV/AIDS	Bruce Davison	Longtime Companion	David Elders	Best Supporting Actor	1990	Nominated
HIV/AIDS	Tom Hanks	Philadelphia	Andrew Beckett	Best Lead Actor	1993	Won
HIV/AIDS	Javier Bardem	Before Night Falls	Reinaldo Arenas	Best Lead Actor	2000	Nominated
HIV/AIDS	Ed Harris	The Hours	Richard "Richie" Brown	Best Supporting Actor	2002	Nominated
HIV/AIDS	Djimon Hounsou	In America	Mateo Kuamey	Best Supporting Actor	2003	Nominated
HIV/AIDS	Jared Leto	Dallas Buyers Club	Rayon	Best Supporting Actor	2013	Won
HIV/AIDS	Matthew McConaughey	Dallas Buyers Club	Ron Woodroof	Best Lead Actor	2013	Won
HIV/AIDS	Rami Malek	Bohemian Rhapsody	Freddie Mercury	Best Lead Actor	2018	Won
HIV/AIDS	Jeremy Strong	The Apprentice	Roy Cohn	Best Supporting Actor	2024	Nominated
Impotence (Erectile Dysfunction)	Warren Beatty	Bonnie and Clyde	Clyde Barrow	Best Lead Actor	1967	Nominated
Invisible Disability	Amy Madigan	Weapons	Aunt Gladys	Best Supporting Actress	2025	Won
Leukemia	Diane Keaton	Marvin's Room	Bessie	Best Lead Actress	1996	Nominated
Limp	Dustin Hoffman	Midnight Cowboy	Enrico Salvatore "Ratso" Rizzo	Best Lead Actor	1969	Nominated
Liver Cancer	Marion Cotillard	La Vie en Rose	Édith Piaf	Best Lead Actress	2007	Won
Marfan Syndrome	Andrew Garfield	Tick, Tick...BOOM!	Jonathan Larson	Best Lead Actor	2021	Nominated
Metastatic Carcinoma	Debra Winger	Shadowlands	Joy Davidman	Best Lead Actress	1993	Nominated
Miliary Fever	Tom Hulce	Amadeus	Wolfgang Amadeus Mozart	Best Lead Actor	1984	Nominated
Morbid Obesity	Gabourey Sidibe	Precious	Claireece "Precious" Jones	Best Lead Actress	2009	Nominated
Morbid Obesity	Brendan Fraser	The Whale	Charlie	Best Lead Actor	2022	Won
Multiple Sclerosis	Emily Watson	Hilary and Jackie	Jacqueline du Pré	Best Lead Actress	1998	Nominated
Muteness	Holly Hunter	The Piano	Ada McGrath	Best Lead Actress	1993	Won
Muteness	Samantha Morton	Sweet and Lowdown	Hattie	Best Supporting Actress	1999	Nominated
Muteness	Sally Hawkins	The Shape of Water	Elisa Esposito	Best Lead Actress	2017	Nominated
Myocardial Rupture	Mickey Rourke	The Wrestler	Robin Ramzinski (a.k.a. Randy "The Ram" Robinson)	Best Lead Actor	2008	Nominated
Non-Hodgkin's Lymphoma	Sylvester Stallone	Creed	Rocky Balboa	Best Supporting Actor	2015	Nominated
Nosebleed	Timothée Chalamet	Call Me by Your Name	Elio Perlman	Best Lead Actor	2017	Nominated
Oral Cancer	Meryl Streep	August: Osage County	Violet Weston	Best Lead Actress	2013	Nominated
Osteoporosis	Felicity Jones	The Brutalist	Erzsébet Tóth	Best Supporting Actress	2024	Nominated
Ovarian Cancer	Meryl Streep	One True Thing	Kate Gulden	Best Lead Actress	1998	Nominated
Pancreatic Cancer	Woody Harrelson	Three Billboards Outside Ebbing, Missouri	Chief Bill Willoughby	Best Supporting Actor	2017	Nominated
Paraplegia	Irene Dunne	Love Affair	Terry McKay	Best Lead Actress	1939	Nominated
Paraplegia	Jon Voight	Coming Home	Luke Martin	Best Lead Actor	1978	Won
Paraplegia	Tom Cruise	Born on the Fourth of July	Sgt. Ron Kovic	Best Lead Actor	1989	Nominated
Paraplegia	Mary McDonnell	Passion Fish	May-Alice Culhane	Best Lead Actress	1992	Nominated
Paraplegia	Woody Harrelson	The People vs. Larry Flynt	Larry Flynt	Best Lead Actor	1996	Nominated
Pneumonia	Glenn Close	Hillbilly Elegy	Bonnie "Mamaw" Vance	Best Supporting Actress	2020/ 2021	Nominated
Polio	Salma Hayek	Frida	Frida Kahlo	Best Lead Actress	2002	Nominated
Prostate Cancer	Javier Bardem	Biutiful	Uxbal	Best Lead Actor	2010	Nominated
Proteus Syndrome	John Hurt	The Elephant Man	Joseph “John” Merrick	Best Lead Actor	1980	Nominated
Pseudobulbar Affect	Joaquin Phoenix	Joker	Arthur Fleck / The Joker	Best Lead Actor	2019	Won
Quadriplegia (Tetraplegia)	Hilary Swank	Million Dollar Baby	Mary Margaret "Maggie" Fitzgerald	Best Lead Actress	2004	Won
Radiation Exposure	Cher	Silkwood	Dolly Pelliker	Best Supporting Actress	1983	Nominated
Scrub Typhus	Warren Beatty	Reds	John Reed	Best Lead Actor	1981	Nominated
Stroke	Emmanuelle Riva	Amour	Anne Laurent	Best Lead Actress	2012	Nominated
Stuttering	Brad Dourif	One Flew Over the Cuckoo's Nest	Billy Bibbit	Best Supporting Actor	1975	Nominated
Stuttering	Colin Firth	The King's Speech	King George VI	Best Lead Actor	2010	Won
Surgical Anastomosis	Emma Stone	Poor Things	Bella Baxter	Best Lead Actress	2023	Won
Surgical Anastomosis	Jacob Elordi	Frankenstein	The Creature a.k.a. Frankenstein's Monster	Best Supporting Actor	2025	Nominated
Terminal Illness	Ali MacGraw	Love Story	Jenny Cavilleri	Best Lead Actress	1970	Nominated
Tuberculosis (Consumption)	Bette Davis	Of Human Bondage	Mildred Rogers	Best Lead Actress	1934	Nominated
Tuberculosis (Consumption)	Greta Garbo	Camille	Marguerite Gautier	Best Lead Actress	1937	Nominated
Tuberculosis (Consumption)	Anne Hathaway	Les Misérables	Fantine	Best Supporting Actress	2012	Won
Visual Impairment	Arthur Kennedy	Bright Victory	Larry Nevins	Best Lead Actor	1951	Nominated
Visual Impairment	Jane Wyman	Magnificent Obsession	Helen Phillips	Best Lead Actress	1954	Nominated
Visual Impairment	Anne Bancroft	The Miracle Worker	Anne Sullivan	Best Lead Actress	1962	Won
Visual Impairment	Elizabeth Hartman	A Patch of Blue	Selina D'Arcey	Best Lead Actress	1965	Nominated
Visual Impairment	Audrey Hepburn	Wait Until Dark	Susy Hendrix	Best Lead Actress	1967	Nominated
Visual Impairment	John Malkovich	Places in the Heart	Mr. Will	Best Supporting Actor	1984	Nominated
Visual Impairment	Al Pacino	Scent of a Woman	Lt. Col. Frank Slade	Best Lead Actor	1992	Won
Visual Impairment	Jamie Foxx	Ray	Ray Charles	Best Lead Actor	2004	Won

== Mental health ==
Disorder	Actor	Film	Character	Category	Year	Status
Agoraphobia	Olivia De Havilland	The Heiress	Catherine Sloper	Best Lead Actress	1949	Won
Amnesia	Ronald Colman	Random Harvest	Charles Rainier ("Smithy")	Best Lead Actor	1942	Nominated
Amnesia	Jennifer Jones	Love Letters	Victoria Remington-Morland (a.k.a. Singleton)	Best Lead Actress	1945	Nominated
Amnesia	Ingrid Bergman	Anastasia	Anna Koreff / Grand Duchess Anastasia	Best Lead Actress	1956	Won
Antisocial Personality Disorder / Sociopathy	Jo Van Fleet	East of Eden	Cathy Ames (a.k.a. Kate Trask/Albey)	Best Supporting Actress	1955	Won
Antisocial Personality Disorder / Sociopathy	Angelina Jolie	Girl, Interrupted	Lisa Rowe	Best Supporting Actress	1999	Won
Antisocial Personality Disorder / Sociopathy	Charlize Theron	Monster	Aileen Wuornos	Best Lead Actress	2003	Won
Antisocial Personality Disorder / Sociopathy	Daniel Day-Lewis	There Will Be Blood	Daniel Plainview	Best Lead Actor	2007	Won
Antisocial Personality Disorder / Sociopathy	Rooney Mara	The Girl with the Dragon Tattoo	Lisbeth Salander	Best Lead Actress	2011	Nominated
Antisocial Personality Disorder / Sociopathy	Rosamund Pike	Gone Girl	Amy Elliott-Dunne	Best Lead Actress	2014	Nominated
Attention Deficit Hyperactivity Disorder	Julie Andrews	The Sound of Music	Maria von Trapp	Best Lead Actress	1965	Nominated
Attention Deficit Hyperactivity Disorder	Elliot Page	Juno	Juno MacGuff	Best Lead Actress	2007	Nominated
Attention Deficit Hyperactivity Disorder	Michelle Yeoh	Everything, Everywhere, All at Once	Evelyn Quan-Wang / Alpha-Evelyn	Best Lead Actress	2022	Won
Autism (Asperger Syndrome)	Dustin Hoffman	Rain Man	Raymond Babbitt	Best Lead Actor	1988	Won
Autism (Asperger Syndrome)	Leonardo DiCaprio	What's Eating Gilbert Grape?	Arnold "Arnie" Grape	Best Supporting Actor	1993	Nominated
Autism (Asperger Syndrome)	Sean Penn	I Am Sam	Samuel John Dawson	Best Lead Actor	2001	Nominated
Autism (Asperger Syndrome)	Cate Blanchett	I'm Not There	Jude Quinn	Best Supporting Actress	2007	Nominated
Autism (Asperger Syndrome)	Jesse Eisenberg	The Social Network	Mark Zuckerberg	Best Lead Actor	2010	Nominated
Autism (Asperger Syndrome)	Denzel Washington	Roman J. Israel, Esq.	Roman J. Israel, Esq.	Best Lead Actor	2017	Nominated
Autism (Asperger Syndrome)	Timothée Chalamet	A Complete Unknown	Bob Dylan	Best Lead Actor	2024	Nominated
Avoidant Personality Disorder	Heath Ledger	Brokeback Mountain	Ennis Del Mar	Best Lead Actor	2005	Nominated
Bipolar Disorder	Jessica Lange	Blue Sky	Carly Marshall	Best Lead Actress	1994	Won
Bipolar Disorder	Nigel Hawthorne	The Madness of King George	King George III	Best Lead Actor	1994	Nominated
Bipolar Disorder	Bradley Cooper	Silver Linings Playbook	Patrizio Solitano Jr.	Best Lead Actor	2012	Nominated
Bipolar Disorder	Gary Oldman	Darkest Hour	Prime Minister Winston Churchill	Best Lead Actor	2017	Won
Bipolar Disorder	Willem Dafoe	At Eternity's Gate	Vincent van Gogh	Best Lead Actor	2018	Nominated
Borderline Personality Disorder	Kathy Bates	Misery	Annie Wilkes	Best Lead Actress	1990	Won
Borderline Personality Disorder	Kate Winslet	Eternal Sunshine of the Spotless Mind	Clementine Kruczynski	Best Lead Actress	2004	Nominated
Borderline Personality Disorder	Jake Gyllenhaal	Brokeback Mountain	Jack Twist	Best Supporting Actor	2005	Nominated
Borderline Personality Disorder	Judi Dench	Notes on a Scandal	Barbara Covett	Best Lead Actress	2006	Nominated
Borderline Personality Disorder	Jennifer Lawrence	Silver Linings Playbook	Tiffany Maxwell	Best Lead Actress	2012	Won
Catatonia	Robert De Niro	Awakenings	Leonard Lowe	Best Lead Actor	1990	Nominated
Delusional Disorder	Katharine Hepburn	Suddenly, Last Summer	Violet "Vi" Venable	Best Lead Actress	1959	Nominated
Dementia / Senility (Alzheimer's Disease)	Walter Matthau	The Sunshine Boys	Willy Clark	Best Lead Actor	1975	Nominated
Dementia / Senility (Alzheimer's Disease)	Judi Dench	Iris	Iris Murdoch	Best Lead Actress	2001	Nominated
Dementia / Senility (Alzheimer's Disease)	Julie Christie	Away from Her	Fiona	Best Lead Actress	2007	Nominated
Dementia / Senility (Alzheimer's Disease)	Julianne Moore	Still Alice	Dr. Alice Daly-Howland	Best Lead Actress	2014	Won
Dementia / Senility (Alzheimer's Disease)	Anthony Hopkins	The Father	Anthony	Best Lead Actor	2020/ 2021	Won
Dependent Personality Disorder	Cate Blanchett	Notes on a Scandal	Sheba Hart	Best Supporting Actress	2006	Nominated
Dissociative Identity Disorder	Fredric March	Dr. Jekyll and Mr. Hyde	Dr. Henry Jekyll / Mr. Edward Hyde	Best Lead Actor	1931/ 1932	Won
Dissociative Identity Disorder	Joanne Woodward	The Three Faces of Eve	Eve Black / Eve White/ Jane	Best Lead Actress	1957	Won
Dissociative Identity Disorder	Edward Norton	Primal Fear	Aaron Stampler / Roy	Best Supporting Actor	1996	Nominated
Erotomania	Glenn Close	Fatal Attraction	Alex Forrest	Best Lead Actress	1987	Nominated
Generalized Anxiety Disorder	Gene Wilder	The Producers	Leopold "Leo" Bloom	Best Supporting Actor	1968	Nominated
Generalized Anxiety Disorder	Jane Fonda	Klute	Bree Daniels	Best Lead Actress	1971	Won
Generalized Anxiety Disorder	Matt Damon	Good Will Hunting	Will Hunting	Best Lead Actor	1997	Nominated
Generalized Anxiety Disorder	Nicolas Cage	Adaptation.	Charlie Kaufman / Donald Kaufman	Best Lead Actor	2002	Nominated
Hallucinations (Auditory a.k.a. Paracusia; Visual) / Psychosis / Paranoia	Ingrid Bergman	Gaslight	Paula Alquist-Anton	Best Lead Actress	1944	Won
Hallucinations (Auditory a.k.a. Paracusia; Visual) / Psychosis / Paranoia	Edith Evans	The Whisperers	Mrs. Margaret Ross	Best Lead Actress	1967	Nominated
Hallucinations (Auditory a.k.a. Paracusia; Visual) / Psychosis / Paranoia	Natalie Portman	Black Swan	Nina Sayers	Best Lead Actress	2010	Won
Hallucinations (Auditory a.k.a. Paracusia; Visual) / Psychosis / Paranoia	Michael Keaton	Birdman, or (The Unexpected Virtue of Ignorance)	Riggan Thomson	Best Lead Actor	2014	Nominated
Hallucinations (Auditory a.k.a. Paracusia; Visual) / Psychosis / Paranoia	Denzel Washington	The Tragedy of Macbeth	Lord Macbeth	Best Lead Actor	2021	Nominated
Histrionic Personality Disorder	Vivien Leigh	Gone with the Wind	Scarlett O'Hara	Best Lead Actress	1939	Won
Histrionic Personality Disorder	Vivien Leigh	A Streetcar Named Desire	Blanche DuBois	Best Lead Actress	1951	Won
Histrionic Personality Disorder	Cate Blanchett	Blue Jasmine	Jeanette "Jasmine" Francis	Best Lead Actress	2013	Won
Intellectual Disability	Michael J. Pollard	Bonnie and Clyde	C.W. Moss	Best Supporting Actor	1967	Nominated
Intellectual Disability	Cliff Robertson	CHAЯLY	Charly Gordon	Best Lead Actor	1968	Won
Intellectual Disability	Peter Sellers	Being There	Chance the Gardener (Chauncey Gardiner)	Best Lead Actor	1979	Nominated
Intellectual Disability	Jodie Foster	Nell	Nell Kellty	Best Lead Actress	1994	Nominated
Intellectual Disability	Tom Hanks	Forrest Gump	Forrest Gump	Best Lead Actor	1994	Won
Intellectual Disability	Billy Bob Thornton	Sling Blade	Karl Childers	Best Lead Actor	1996	Nominated
Intellectual Disability	Barry Keoghan	The Banshees of Inisherin	Dominic Kearney	Best Supporting Actor	2022	Nominated
Major Depressive Disorder	George Arliss	Disraeli	Prime Minister Benjamin Disraeli	Best Lead Actor	1929/ 1930	Won
Major Depressive Disorder	Fredric March	Death of a Salesman	Willy Loman	Best Lead Actor	1951	Nominated
Major Depressive Disorder	Jane Fonda	They Shoot Horses, Don't They?	Gloria Beatty	Best Lead Actress	1969	Nominated
Major Depressive Disorder	Nicole Kidman	The Hours	Virginia Woolf	Best Lead Actress	2002	Won
Major Depressive Disorder	Bradley Cooper	Maestro	Leonard Bernstein	Best Lead Actor	2023	Nominated
Major Depressive Disorder	Cillian Murphy	Oppenheimer	J. Robert Oppenheimer	Best Lead Actor	2023	Won
Mania	Al Pacino	Dog Day Afternoon	Sonny Wortzik	Best Lead Actor	1975	Nominated
Mania	Tom Wilkinson	Michael Clayton	Arthur Edens, Esq.	Best Supporting Actor	2007	Nominated
Marfan Syndrome	Raymond Massey	Abe Lincoln in Illinois	Abraham Lincoln	Best Lead Actor	1940	Nominated
Marfan Syndrome	Daniel Day-Lewis	Lincoln	Abraham Lincoln	Best Lead Actor	2012	Won
Narcissistic Personality Disorder	Charles Boyer	Gaslight	Gregory Anton / Sergis Bauer	Best Lead Actor	1944	Nominated
Narcissistic Personality Disorder	Angela Lansbury	The Manchurian Candidate	Eleanor Shaw-Iselin	Best Supporting Actress	1962	Nominated
Narcissistic Personality Disorder	Louise Fletcher	One Flew Over the Cuckoo's Nest	Nurse Mildred Ratched	Best Lead Actress	1975	Won
Narcissistic Personality Disorder	Mary Tyler Moore	Ordinary People	Beth Jarrett	Best Lead Actress	1980	Nominated
Narcissistic Personality Disorder	Michael Fassbender	Steve Jobs	Steve Jobs	Best Lead Actor	2015	Nominated
Narcissistic Personality Disorder	Timothée Chalamet	Marty Supreme	Marty Mauser	Best Lead Actor	2025	Nominated
Nervous Breakdown	Bette Davis	Now, Voyager	Charlotte Vale	Best Lead Actress	1942	Nominated
Nervous Breakdown	Elizabeth Taylor	Suddenly, Last Summer	Catherine Holly	Best Lead Actress	1959	Nominated
Nervous Breakdown	Natalie Wood	Splendor in the Grass	Wilma Dean "Deanie" Loomis	Best Lead Actress	1961	Nominated
Nervous Breakdown	Susannah York	They Shoot Horses, Don't They?	Alice LeBlanc	Best Supporting Actress	1969	Nominated
Nervous Breakdown	Peter Finch	Network	Howard Beale	Best Lead Actor	1976	Won
Nervous Breakdown	Kevin Spacey	American Beauty	Lester Burnham	Best Lead Actor	1999	Won
Neurosis	Diane Keaton	Annie Hall	Annie Hall	Best Lead Actress	1977	Won
Neurosis	Woody Allen	Annie Hall	Alvy Singer	Best Lead Actor	1977	Nominated
Neurosis	Annette Bening	American Beauty	Carolyn Burnham	Best Lead Actress	1999	Nominated
Obsessive-Compulsive Disorder	Jack Nicholson	As Good as It Gets	Melvin Udall	Best Lead Actor	1997	Won
Obsessive-Compulsive Disorder	Leonardo DiCaprio	The Aviator	Howard Hughes	Best Lead Actor	2004	Nominated
Obsessive-Compulsive Disorder	Robert De Niro	Silver Linings Playbook	Patrizio Solitano Sr.	Best Supporting Actor	2012	Nominated
Pathological Jealousy	Laurence Olivier	Othello	Othello	Best Lead Actor	1965	Nominated
Post-Traumatic Stress Disorder	Gregory Peck	Twelve O'Clock High	Brig. Gen. Frank Savage	Best Lead Actor	1949	Nominated
Post-Traumatic Stress Disorder	Peter O'Toole	Lawrence of Arabia	T.E. Lawrence	Best Lead Actor	1962	Nominated
Post-Traumatic Stress Disorder	Bobby Darin	Captain Newman, M.D.	Cpl. Jim Tompkins, USAAF	Best Supporting Actor	1963	Nominated
Post-Traumatic Stress Disorder	Rod Steiger	The Pawnbroker	Sol Nazerman	Best Lead Actor	1965	Nominated
Post-Traumatic Stress Disorder	Jack Lemmon	Save the Tiger	Harry Stoner	Best Lead Actor	1973	Won
Post-Traumatic Stress Disorder	Robert De Niro	Taxi Driver	Travis Bickle	Best Lead Actor	1976	Nominated
Post-Traumatic Stress Disorder	Robert De Niro	The Deer Hunter	Staff Sgt. Mikhail "Mike" Vronsky	Best Lead Actor	1978	Nominated
Post-Traumatic Stress Disorder	Christopher Walken	The Deer Hunter	Cpl. Nikanor Chevotarevich	Best Supporting Actor	1978	Won
Post-Traumatic Stress Disorder	Timothy Hutton	Ordinary People	Conrad Jarrett	Best Supporting Actor	1980	Won
Post-Traumatic Stress Disorder	Tim Robbins	Mystic River	Dave Boyle	Best Supporting Actor	2003	Won
Post-Traumatic Stress Disorder	Mo'Nique	Precious	Mary Lee Johnston	Best Supporting Actres	2009	Won
Post-Traumatic Stress Disorder	Jeremy Renner	The Hurt Locker	Sgt. 1st Class William James	Best Lead Actor	2009	Nominated
Post-Traumatic Stress Disorder	Joaquin Phoenix	The Master	Freddie Quell	Best Lead Actor	2012	Nominated
Post-Traumatic Stress Disorder	Bradley Cooper	American Sniper	Chief Petty Off. Chris Kyle	Best Lead Actor	2014	Nominated
Post-Traumatic Stress Disorder	Brie Larson	Room	Joy "Ma" Newsome	Best Lead Actress	2015	Won
Post-Traumatic Stress Disorder	Casey Affleck	Manchester by the Sea	Lee Chandler	Best Lead Actor	2016	Won
Post-Traumatic Stress Disorder	Michelle Williams	Manchester by the Sea	Randi Chandler	Best Supporting Actress	2016	Nominated
Post-Traumatic Stress Disorder	Margot Robbie	I, Tonya	Tonya Harding	Best Lead Actress	2017	Nominated
Post-Traumatic Stress Disorder	Rose Byrne	If I Had Legs, I'd Kick You	Linda	Best Lead Actress	2025	Nominated
Psychopathy	Gene Tierney	Leave Her to Heaven	Ellen Berent-Harland	Best Lead Actress	1945	Nominated
Psychopathy	Anthony Hopkins	The Silence of the Lambs	Hannibal Lecter	Best Lead Actor	1991	Won
Psychopathy	Javier Bardem	No Country for Old Men	Anton Chigurh	Best Supporting Actor	2007	Won
Psychopathy	Heath Ledger	The Dark Knight	The Joker	Best Supporting Actor	2008	Won
Religious Delusion	Piper Laurie	Carrie	Margaret White	Best Supporting Actress	1976	Nominated
Schizoaffective Disorder / Schizophrenia	Ronald Colman	A Double Life	Anthony "Tony" John / Othello	Best Lead Actor	1947	Won
Schizoaffective Disorder / Schizophrenia	Olivia de Havilland	The Snake Pit	Virginia Stuart-Cunningham	Best Lead Actress	1948	Nominated
Schizoaffective Disorder / Schizophrenia	Isabelle Adjani	The Story of Adèle H.	Adèle Hugo (a.k.a. Adèle Lewly)	Best Lead Actress	1975	Nominated
Schizoaffective Disorder / Schizophrenia	Peter Firth	Equus	Alan Strang	Best Supporting Actor	1977	Nominated
Schizoaffective Disorder / Schizophrenia	Jessica Lange	Frances	Frances Farmer	Best Lead Actress	1982	Nominated
Schizoaffective Disorder / Schizophrenia	Robin Williams	The Fisher King	Henry "Parry" Sagan	Best Lead Actor	1991	Nominated
Schizoaffective Disorder / Schizophrenia	Geoffrey Rush	Shine	David Helfgott	Best Lead Actor	1996	Won
Schizoaffective Disorder / Schizophrenia	Russell Crowe	A Beautiful Mind	John Forbes Nash Jr.	Best Lead Actor	2001	Nominated
Schizoaffective Disorder / Schizophrenia	Sally Field	Lincoln	Mary Todd Lincoln	Best Supporting Actress	2012	Nominated
Social Anxiety Disorder	Talia Shire	Rocky	Adrianna “Adrian” Pennino	Best Lead Actress	1976	Nominated
Somatic Symptom Disorder	Tilda Swinton	Michael Clayton	Karen Crowder	Best Supporting Actress	2007	Won
Telekinesis	Sissy Spacek	Carrie	Carrie White	Best Lead Actress	1976	Nominated
Undiagnosed Mental Disorder	Sal Mineo	Rebel Without a Cause	John "Plato" Crawford	Best Supporting Actor	1955	Nominated
Undiagnosed Mental Disorder	Elizabeth Taylor	Raintree County	Susanna Drake	Best Lead Actress	1957	Nominated
Undiagnosed Mental Disorder	Bette Davis	What Ever Happened to Baby Jane?	Baby Jane Hudson	Best Lead Actress	1962	Nominated
Undiagnosed Mental Disorder	Gena Rowlands	A Woman Under the Influence	Mabel Longhetti	Best Lead Actress	1974	Nominated
Undiagnosed Mental Disorder	Jack Nicholson	One Flew Over the Cuckoo's Nest	Randle Patrick “Mac” McMurphy	Best Lead Actor	1975	Won
Undiagnosed Mental Disorder	F. Murray Abraham	Amadeus	Antonio Salieri	Best Lead Actor	1984	Won
Undiagnosed Mental Disorder	Meg Tilly	Agnes of God	Sister Agnes Devereaux	Best Supporting Actress	1985	Nominated
Undiagnosed Mental Disorder	Brad Pitt	12 Monkeys	Jeffrey Goines	Best Supporting Actor	1995	Nominated
Undiagnosed Mental Disorder	Michael Shannon	Revolutionary Road	John Givings Jr.	Best Supporting Actor	2008	Nominated
Undiagnosed Mental Disorder	Benedict Cumberbatch	The Power of the Dog	Phil Burbank	Best Lead Actor	2021	Nominated
Undiagnosed Mental Disorder	Michelle Williams	The Fabelmans	Mitzi Fabelman	Best Lead Actress	2022	Nominated
Undiagnosed Mental Disorder	Stephanie Hsu	Everything, Everywhere, All at Once	Joy Wang / Jobu Tupaki	Best Supporting Actress	2022	Nominated

== Substance abuse ==
Condition	Actor	Film	Character	Category	Year	Status
Alcoholism	Lionel Barrymore	A Free Soul	Stephen Ashe	Best Lead Actor	1930/ 1931	Won
Alcoholism	Wallace Beery	The Champ	Andy "Champ" Purcell	Best Lead Actor	1931/ 1932	Won
Alcoholism	Victor McLaglen	The Informer	"Gypo" Nolan	Best Lead Actor	1935	Won
Alcoholism	Fredric March	A Star Is Born	Norman Maine	Best Lead Actor	1937	Nominated
Alcoholism	Thomas Mitchell	Stagecoach	Doc Boone	Best Supporting Actor	1939	Won
Alcoholism	Van Heflin	Johnny Eager	Jeff Hartnett	Best Supporting Actor	1942	Won
Alcoholism	James Dunn	A Tree Grows in Brooklyn	Johnny Nolan	Best Supporting Actor	1945	Won
Alcoholism	Ray Milland	The Lost Weekend	Don Birnam	Best Lead Actor	1945	Won
Alcoholism	Fredric March	The Best Years of Our Lives	Sgt. Al Stephenson	Best Lead Actor	1946	Won
Alcoholism	Anne Baxter	The Razor's Edge	Sophie MacDonald	Best Supporting Actress	1946	Won
Alcoholism	Susan Hayward	Smash-Up: The Story of a Woman!	Angie Evans	Best Lead Actress	1947	Nominated
Alcoholism	Claire Trevor	Key Largo	Gaye Dawn	Best Supporting Actress	1948	Won
Alcoholism	Marlon Brando	A Streetcar Named Desire	Stanley Kowalski	Best Lead Actor	1951	Nominated
Alcoholism	Gig Young	Come Fill the Cup	Boyd Copeland	Best Supporting Actor	1951	Nominated
Alcoholism	Victor McLaglen	The Quiet Man	Squire Will "Red" Danaher	Best Supporting Actor	1952	Nominated
Alcoholism	Bing Crosby	The Country Girl	Frank Elgin	Best Lead Actor	1954	Nominated
Alcoholism	James Mason	A Star Is Born	Norman Maine	Best Lead Actor	1954	Nominated
Alcoholism	Susan Hayward	I'll Cry Tomorrow	Lillian Roth	Best Lead Actress	1955	Nominated
Alcoholism	Dorothy Malone	Written on the Wind	Marylee Hadley	Best Supporting Actress	1956	Won
Alcoholism	Kirk Douglas	Lust for Life	Vincent van Gogh	Best Lead Actor	1956	Nominated
Alcoholism	Paul Newman	Cat on a Hot Tin Roof	Richard "Brick" Pollitt	Best Lead Actor	1958	Nominated
Alcoholism	Laurence Olivier	The Entertainer	Archie Rice	Best Lead Actor	1960	Nominated
Alcoholism	Bette Davis	What Ever Happened to Baby Jane?	"Baby Jane" Hudson	Best Lead Actress	1962	Nominated
Alcoholism	Geraldine Page	Sweet Bird of Youth	Alexandra Del Lago	Best Lead Actress	1962	Nominated
Alcoholism	Lee Remick	Days of Wine and Roses	Kirsten Arnesen-Clay	Best Lead Actress	1962	Nominated
Alcoholism	Jack Lemmon	Days of Wine and Roses	Joe Clay	Best Lead Actor	1962	Nominated
Alcoholism	Lee Marvin	Cat Ballou	Kid Shelleen / Tim Strawn	Best Lead Actor	1965	Won
Alcoholism	Richard Burton	Who's Afraid of Virginia Woolf?	George	Best Lead Actor	1966	Nominated
Alcoholism	Elizabeth Taylor	Who's Afraid of Virginia Woolf?	Martha	Best Lead Actress	1966	Won
Alcoholism	George Segal	Who's Afraid of Virginia Woolf?	Nick	Best Supporting Actor	1966	Nominated
Alcoholism	Sandy Dennis	Who's Afraid of Virginia Woolf?	Honey	Best Supporting Actress	1966	Won
Alcoholism	Gene Hackman	The French Connection	Det. Jimmy "Popeye" Doyle	Best Lead Actor	1971	Won
Alcoholism	Maggie Smith	California Suite	Diana Barrie	Best Supporting Actress	1978	Won
Alcoholism	Bette Midler	The Rose	Mary Rose Foster	Best Lead Actress	1979	Nominated
Alcoholism	Marsha Mason	Only When I Laugh	Georgia Hines	Best Lead Actress	1981	Nominated
Alcoholism	Dudley Moore	Arthur	Arthur Bach	Best Lead Actor	1981	Nominated
Alcoholism	Paul Newman	The Verdict	Attny. Frank Galvin	Best Lead Actor	1982	Nominated
Alcoholism	Peter O'Toole	My Favorite Year	Alan Swann	Best Lead Actor	1982	Nominated
Alcoholism	Robert Duvall	Tender Mercies	Mac Sledge	Best Lead Actor	1983	Won
Alcoholism	Albert Finney	Under the Volcano	Geoffrey Firmin	Best Lead Actor	1984	Nominated
Alcoholism	Dexter Gordon	'Round Midnight	Dale Turner	Best Lead Actor	1986	Nominated
Alcoholism	Jane Fonda	The Morning After	Alexandra Sternbergen (a.k.a. Viveca Van Loren)	Best Lead Actress	1986	Nominated
Alcoholism	Dennis Hopper	Hoosiers	Wilbur "Shooter" Flatch	Best Supporting Actor	1986	Nominated
Alcoholism	Jack Nicholson	Ironweed	Francis Phelan	Best Lead Actor	1987	Nominated
Alcoholism	Meryl Streep	Ironweed	Helen Archer	Best Lead Actress	1987	Nominated
Alcoholism	Mary McDonnell	Passion Fish	May-Alice Culhane	Best Lead Actress	1992	Nominated
Alcoholism	Al Pacino	Scent of a Woman	Lt. Col. Frank Slade	Best Lead Actor	1992	Won
Alcoholism	Judy Davis	Husbands and Wives	Sally Simmons	Best Supporting Actress	1992	Nominated
Alcoholism	Angela Bassett	What's Love Got to Do with It?	Tina Turner	Best Lead Actress	1993	Nominated
Alcoholism	Martin Landau	Ed Wood	Bela Lugosi	Best Supporting Actor	1994	Won
Alcoholism	Dianne Wiest	Bullets Over Broadway	Helen Sinclair	Best Supporting Actress	1994	Won
Alcoholism	Nicolas Cage	Leaving Las Vegas	Ben Sanderson	Best Lead Actor	1995	Won
Alcoholism	James Coburn	Affliction	Glen Whitehouse	Best Supporting Actor	1998	Won
Alcoholism	Ed Harris	Pollock	Jackson Pollock	Best Lead Actor	2000	Nominated
Alcoholism	Johnny Depp	Pirates of the Caribbean: The Curse of the Black Pearl	Capt. Jack Sparrow	Best Lead Actor	2003	Nominated
Alcoholism	Bill Murray	Lost in Translation	Bob Harris	Best Lead Actor	2003	Nominated
Alcoholism	Jeff Bridges	Crazy Heart	Otis "Bad" Blake	Best Lead Actor	2009	Won
Alcoholism	Nick Nolte	Warrior	Paddy Conlon	Best Supporting Actor	2011	Nominated
Alcoholism	Denzel Washington	Flight	Capt. William "Whip" Whitaker	Best Lead Actor	2012	Nominated
Alcoholism	Bruce Dern	Nebraska	Woodrow T. "Woody" Grant	Best Lead Actor	2013	Nominated
Alcoholism	Bradley Cooper	A Star Is Born	Jackson Maine	Best Lead Actor	2018	Nominated
Alcoholism	Renée Zellweger	Judy	Judy Garland	Best Lead Actress	2019	Won
Alcoholism	Gary Oldman	Mank	Herman J. Mankiewicz	Best Lead Actor	2020/ 2021	Nominated
Alcoholism	J.K. Simmons	Being the Ricardos	William Frawley	Best Supporting Actor	2021	Nominated
Alcoholism	Andrea Riseborough	To Leslie	Leslie "Lee" Rowland	Best Lead Actress	2022	Nominated
Alcoholism	Emily Blunt	Oppenheimer	Kitty Oppenheimer	Best Supporting Actress	2023	Nominated
Alcoholism	Ethan Hawke	Blue Moon	Lorenz Hart	Best Lead Actor	2025	Nominated
Amphetamines & Barbiturates	Joaquin Phoenix	Walk the Line	Johnny Cash	Best Lead Actor	2005	Nominated
Cocaine Dependence	Meryl Streep	Postcards from the Edge	Suzanne Vale	Best Lead Actress	1990	Nominated
Cocaine Dependence	Sharon Stone	Casino	Ginger McKenna	Best Lead Actress	1995	Nominated
Cocaine Dependence	Ryan Gosling	Half Nelson	Dan Dunne	Best Lead Actor	2006	Nominated
Cocaine Dependence	Christian Bale	The Fighter	Dicky Eklund	Best Supporting Actor	2010	Won
Cocaine Dependence	Naomie Harris	Moonlight	Paula	Best Supporting Actress	2016	Nominated
Crystal Meth	John Hawkes	Winter's Bone	Uncle "Teardrop"	Best Supporting Actor	2010	Nominated
Heroin Overdose	Uma Thurman	Pulp Fiction	Mia Wallace	Best Supporting Actress	1994	Nominated
Marijuana Usage	Nick Nolte	Affliction	Wade Whitehouse	Best Lead Actor	1998	Nominated
Marijuana Usage	Leonardo DiCaprio	One Battle After Another	Bob Ferguson	Best Lead Actor	2025	Nominated
Miscellaneous Recreational Drug Abuse	Tuesday Weld	Looking for Mr. Goodbar	Katherine Dunn	Best Supporting Actress	1977	Nominated
Miscellaneous Recreational Drug Abuse	Chris Cooper	Adaptation.	John Laroche	Best Supporting Actor	2002	Won
Miscellaneous Recreational Drug Abuse	Meryl Streep	Adaptation.	Susan Orlean	Best Supporting Actress	2002	Nominated
Miscellaneous Recreational Drug Abuse	Amy Ryan	Gone Baby Gone	Helene McCready	Best Supporting Actress	2007	Nominated
Miscellaneous Recreational Drug Abuse	Anne Hathaway	Rachel Getting Married	Kym Buchman	Best Lead Actress	2008	Nominated
Miscellaneous Recreational Drug Abuse	Emma Stone	Birdman, or (The Unexpected Virtue of Ignorance)	Sam Thomson	Best Supporting Actress	2014	Nominated
Morphine Addiction	Anthony Franciosa	A Hatful of Rain	Polo Pope	Best Lead Actor	1957	Nominated
Morphine Addiction	Katharine Hepburn	Long Day's Journey into Night	Mary Tyrone	Best Lead Actress	1962	Nominated
Morphine Addiction	Dustin Hoffman	Lenny	Lenny Bruce	Best Lead Actor	1974	Nominated
Opiod Use Disorder	Frank Sinatra	The Man with the Golden Arm	Frankie Machine	Best Lead Actor	1955	Nominated
Opiod Use Disorder	Diana Ross	Lady Sings the Blues	Billie Holiday	Best Lead Actress	1972	Nominated
Opiod Use Disorder	John Travolta	Pulp Fiction	Vincent Vega	Best Lead Actor	1994	Nominated
Opiod Use Disorder	Jamie Foxx	Ray	Ray Charles	Best Lead Actor	2004	Won
Opiod Use Disorder	Andra Day	The United States vs. Billie Holiday	Billie Holiday	Best Lead Actress	2020/ 2021	Nominated
Qualudes (Methaqualone)	Leonardo DiCaprio	The Wolf of Wall Street	Jordan Belfort	Best Lead Actor	2013	Nominated
Stimulant Psychosis	Ellen Burstyn	Requiem for a Dream	Sara Goldfarb	Best Lead Actress	2000	Nominated

== Performances nominated opposite other disabled characters ==
Film	Actor	Character	Opposite	Category	Year	Status
Agnes of God	Anne Bancroft	Mother Miriam Ruth (née Anna Maria Burchetti)	Meg Tilly as Sister Agnes Devereaux (Undiagnosed Mental Disorder)	Best Lead Actress	1985	Nominated
The Apprentice	Sebastian Stan	Donald Trump	Jeremy Strong as Roy Cohn (HIV/AIDS)	Best Lead Actor	2024	Nominated
Bang the Drum Slowly	Vincent Gardenia	Dutch Schnell	Robert De Niro as Bruce Pearson (Hodgkin Lymphoma)	Best Supporting Actor	1973	Nominated
A Beautiful Mind	Jennifer Connelly	Alicia Nash	Russell Crowe as John Forbes Nash Jr. (Schizoaffective Disorder / Schizophrenia)	Best Supporting Actress	2001	Won
Bonnie and Clyde	Estelle Parsons	Blanche Barrow	Faye Dunaway as Bonnie Parker (Burn Victim)	Best Supporting Actress	1967	Nominated
Bonnie and Clyde	Gene Hackman	Buck Barrow	Warren Beatty as Clyde Barrow (Limp)	Best Supporting Actor	1967	Nominated
Bonnie and Clyde	Gene Hackman	Buck Barrow	Michael J. Pollard as C.W. Moss (Intellectual Disability)	Best Supporting Actor	1967	Nominated
Bugonia	Emma Stone	Michelle Fuller	Jesse Plemons as Teddy Gatz (Schizoaffective Disorder / Schizophrenia)	Best Lead Actress	2025	Nominated
Butterflies Are Free	Eileen Heckart	Mrs. Florence Baker	Edward Albert as Don Baker (Blind)	Best Supporting Actress	1972	Won
Cat on a Hot Tin Roof	Paul Newman	”Brick” Pollitt	Burl Ives as Harvey “Big Daddy” Pollitt (Cancer)	Best Lead Actor	1958	Nominated
Cat on a Hot Tin Roof	Elizabeth Taylor	Margaret “Maggie the Cat” Pollitt	Burl Ives as Harvey “Big Daddy” Pollitt (Cancer)	Best Lead Actress	1958	Nominated
Children of a Lesser God	Piper Laurie	Mrs. Norman	Marlee Matlin as Sarah Norman (Deaf)	Best Supporting Actress	1986	Nominated
Children of a Lesser God	William Hurt	James Leeds	Marlee Matlin as Sarah Norman (Deaf)	Best Lead Actor	1986	Nominated
Coming Home	Jane Fonda	Sally Bender-Hyde	Jon Voight as Luke Martin (Paraplegia)	Best Lead Actress	1978	Won
Coming Home	Bruce Dern	Capt. Bob Hyde	Jon Voight as Luke Martin (Paraplegia)	Best Supporting Actor	1978	Nominated
Coming Home	Penelope Milford	Vi Munson	Jon Voight as Luke Martin (Paraplegia)	Best Supporting Actress	1978	Nominated
East of Eden	James Dean	Caleb “Cal” Trask	Jo Van Fleet as Cathy Ames a.k.a. Kate Trask/Albey (Antisocial Personality Disorder / Sociopathy)	Best Lead Actor	1955	Nominated
Erin Brockovich	Julia Roberts	Erin Brockovich (née Pattee)	Marg Helgenberger as Donna Jensen (Neoplasm a.k.a. Tumors)	Best Lead Actress	2000	Won
Erin Brockovich	Albert Finney	Edward L. Masry	Marg Helgenberger as Donna Jensen (Neoplasm a.k.a. Tumors)	Best Supporting Actor	2000	Nominated
The Fighter	Melissa Leo	Alice Eklund-Ward	Christian Bale as Dicky Eklund (Cocaine Dependence)	Best Supporting Actor	2010	Won
Five Easy Pieces	Jack Nicholson	Robert "Bobby" Eroica Dupea	William Challee as Nicholas Dupea (Stroke)	Best Lead Actor	1970	Nominated
Five Easy Pieces	Karen Black	Rayette DiPesto	William Challee as Nicholas Dupea (Stroke)	Best Supporting Actress	1970	Nominated
Gaby: A True Story	Norma Aleandro	Florencia Sánchez-Morales	Rachel Chagall (née Levin) as Gabriela Brimmer (Cerebral Palsy)	Best Supporting Actress	1987	Nominated
Georgia	Mare Winningham	Georgia Flood	Jennifer Jason Leigh as Sadie Flood (Substance Use Disorder)	Best Supporting Actress	1995	Nominated
Girl, Interrupted	Angelina Jolie	Lisa Rowe	Winona Ryder as Susanna Kaysen (Borderline Personality Disorder)	Best Supporting Actress	1999	Won
Girl, Interrupted	Angelina Jolie	Lisa Rowe	Clea DuVall as Georgina Tuskin (Pathological Liar)	Best Supporting Actress	1999	Won
Girl, Interrupted	Angelina Jolie	Lisa Rowe	Brittany Murphy as Daisy Randone (Obsessive-Compulsive Disorder)	Best Supporting Actress	1999	Won
If I Had Legs, I'd Kick You	Rose Byrne	Linda	Delaney Quinn as Linda's Daughter (Feeding Disorder)	Best Lead Actress	2025	Nominated
Inside Moves	Diana Scarwid	Louise	John Savage as Roary (Crippled)	Best Supporting Actress	1980	Nominated
Jezebel	Fay Bainter	Aunt Belle Massey	Henry Fonda as Preston Dillard (Yellow Fever)	Best Supporting Actress	1938	Won
Jezebel	Bette Davis	Julie Marsden	Henry Fonda as Preston Dillard (Yellow Fever)	Best Lead Actress	1938	Won
Johnny Belinda	Lew Ayres	Dr. Robert Richardson	Jane Wyman as Belinda MacDonald (Deaf-Mute)	Best Lead Actor	1948	Nominated
Johnny Belinda	Charles Bickford	Black MacDonald	Jane Wyman as Belinda MacDonald (Deaf-Mute)	Best Supporting Actor	1948	Nominated
Johnny Belinda	Agnes Moorehead	Aggie MacDonald	Jane Wyman as Belinda MacDonald (Deaf-Mute)	Best Supporting Actress	1948	Nominated
The Last Picture Show	Cloris Leachman	Ruth Popper	Ben Johnson as "Sam the Lion" (Stroke)	Best Supporting Actress	1971	Won
The Last Picture Show	Ellen Burstyn	Lois Farrow	Ben Johnson as "Sam the Lion" (Stroke)	Best Supporting Actress	1971	Nominated
The Last Picture Show	Jeff Bridges	Duane Jackson	Ben Johnson as "Sam the Lion" (Stroke)	Best Supporting Actor	1971	Nominated
Leaving Las Vegas	Elisabeth Shue	Sera	Nicolas Cage as Ben Sanderson (Alcoholism)	Best Lead Actress	1995	Nominated
Little Women	Saoirse Ronan	Josephine "Jo" March	Eliza Scanlen as Elizabeth "Beth" March (Scarlet Fever)	Best Lead Actress	2019	Nominated
Little Women	Florence Pugh	Amy Curtis March	Eliza Scanlen as Elizabeth "Beth" March (Scarlet Fever)	Best Supporting Actress	2019	Nominated
Lorenzo's Oil	Susan Sarandon	Michaela Odone	Zack O'Malley-Greenburg as Lorenzo Odone (Adrenoleukodystrophy)	Best Lead Actress	1992	Nominated
Love Story	Ryan O'Neal	Oliver Barrett IV	Ali MacGraw as Jenny Cavilleri (Terminal Illness)	Best Lead Actor	1970	Nominated
Love Story	John Marley	Phil Cavilleri	Ali MacGraw as Jenny Cavilleri (Terminal Illness)	Best Supporting Actor	1970	Nominated
Magnolia	Tom Cruise	Frank T.J. Mackey	Philip Baker Hall as Jimmy Gator (Cancer)	Best Supporting Actor	1999	Nominated
Magnolia	Tom Cruise	Frank T.J. Mackey	Julianne Moore as Linda Partridge (Drug Overdose)	Best Supporting Actor	1999	Nominated
Michael Clayton	George Clooney	Michael Clayton	Tilda Swinton as Karen Crowder (Somatic Symptom Disorder)	Best Lead Actor	2007	Nominated
Michael Clayton	George Clooney	Michael Clayton	Tom Wilkinson as Arthur Edens (Mania)	Best Lead Actor	2007	Nominated
Million Dollar Baby	Clint Eastwood	Frankie Dunn	Hilary Swank as Mary Margaret "Maggie" Fitzgerald (Quadriplegia aka Tetraplegia)	Best Lead Actor	2004	Nominated
Million Dollar Baby	Morgan Freeman	Eddie "Scrap-Iron" Dupris	Hilary Swank as Mary Margaret "Maggie" Fitzgerald (Quadriplegia aka Tetraplegia)	Best Supporting Actor	2004	Won
Mr. Holland's Opus	Richard Dreyfuss	Glenn Holland	Anthony Natale as Coltrane "Cole" Holland (Deaf)	Best Lead Actor	1995	Nominated
Network	Faye Dunaway	Diana Christensen	Peter Finch as Howard Beale (Nervous Breakdown)	Best Lead Actress	1976	Won
Network	William Holden	Max Schumacher	Peter Finch as Howard Beale (Nervous Breakdown)	Best Lead Actor	1976	Nominated
Network	Beatrice Straight	Louise Schumacher	Peter Finch as Howard Beale (Nervous Breakdown)	Best Supporting Actress	1976	Won
Network	Ned Beatty	Arthur Jensen	Peter Finch as Howard Beale (Nervous Breakdown)	Best Supporting Actor	1976	Nominated
Ordinary People	Judd Hirsch	Tyrone C. Berger	Timothy Hutton as Conrad Jarrett (Post-Traumatic Stress Disorder)	Best Supporting Actor	1980	Nominated
Ordinary People	Judd Hirsch	Tyrone C. Berger	Mary Tyler Moore as Beth Jarrett (Narcissistic Personality Disorder)	Best Supporting Actor	1980	Nominated
Othello	Frank Finlay	Iago	Laurence Olivier as Othello (Pathological Jealousy)	Best Supporting Actor	1965	Nominated
Othello	Maggie Smith	Desdemona	Laurence Olivier as Othello (Pathological Jealousy)	Best Supporting Actress	1965	Nominated
Othello	Joyce Redman	Emilia	Laurence Olivier as Othello (Pathological Jealousy)	Best Supporting Actress	1965	Nominated
A Patch of Blue	Shelley Winters	Rose-Ann D'Arcey	Elizabeth Hartman as Selina D'Arcey (Blind)	Best Supporting Actress	1965	Won
Places in the Heart	Sally Field	Edna Spalding	John Malkovich as Mr. Will (Blind)	Best Lead Actress	1984	Won
Places in the Heart	Lindsay Crouse	Margaret Lomax	John Malkovich as Mr. Will (Blind)	Best Supporting Actress	1984	Nominated
The Pride of the Yankees	Teresa Wright	Eleanor Twitchell-Gehrig	Gary Cooper as Lou Gehrig (ALS a.k.a. Lou Gehrig’s Disease)	Best Lead Actress	1942	Nominated
Rebel Without a Cause	Natalie Wood	Judy	Sal Mineo as John "Plato" Crawford (Undiagnosed Mental Disorder)	Best Supporting Actress	1955	Nominated
Rebel Without a Cause	Natalie Wood	Judy	James Dean as Jim Stark (Oppositional Defiant Disorder)	Best Supporting Actress	1955	Nominated
The Savages	Laura Linney	Wendy Savage	Philip Bosco as Lenny Savage (Dementia i.e. Alzheimer’s Disease)	Best Lead Actress	2008	Nominated
The Sessions	Helen Hunt	Cheryl Cohen-Greene	John Hawkes as Mark O'Brien (Polio)	Best Supporting Actress	2012	Nominated
The Shape of Water	Octavia Spencer	Zelda Delilah Fuller	Sally Hawkins as Elisa Esposito (Deaf-Mute)	Best Supporting Actress	2017	Nominated
The Shape of Water	Richard Jenkins	Giles	Sally Hawkins as Elisa Esposito (Deaf-Mute)	Best Supporting Actor	2017	Nominated
Sideways	Thomas Haden Church	Jack Cole	Paul Giamatti as Miles Raymond (Alcoholism)	Best Supporting Actor	2004	Nominated
Sideways	Virginia Madsen	Maya Randall	Paul Giamatti as Miles Raymond (Alcoholism)	Best Supporting Actress	2004	Nominated
Spellbound	Michael Chekhov	Dr. Alexander Brulov	Gregory Peck as Dr. Anthony Edwardes / John Ballantyne/Brown (Amnesia)	Best Supporting Actor	1945	Nominated
A Streetcar Named Desire	Karl Malden	Mitch	Vivien Leigh as Blanche DuBois (Histrionic Personality Disorder)	Best Supporting Actor	1951	Won
A Streetcar Named Desire	Kim Hunter	Stella Kowalski	Marlon Brando as Stanley Kowalski (Alcoholism)	Best Supporting Actress	1951	Won
Sunrise at Campobello	Greer Garson	Eleanor Roosevelt	Ralph Bellamy as Franklin D. Roosevelt (Guillain–Barré Syndrome)	Best Lead Actress	1960	Nominated
Terms of Endearment	Shirley MacLaine	Aurora Greenway	Debra Winger as Emma Greenway-Horton (Cancer)	Best Lead Actress	1983	Won
Terms of Endearment	Jack Nicholson	Garrett Breedlove	Debra Winger as Emma Greenway-Horton (Cancer)	Best Supporting Actor	1983	Won
Terms of Endearment	John Lithgow	Sam Burns	Debra Winger as Emma Greenway-Horton (Cancer)	Best Supporting Actor	1983	Nominated
There Will Be Blood	Daniel Day-Lewis	Daniel Plainview	Russell Harvard as H.W. Plainview (Deaf)	Best Lead Actor	2007	Won
Three Billboards Outside Ebbing, Missouri	Sam Rockwell	Jason Dixon	Woody Harrelson as Sheriff Bill Willoughby (Pancreatic Cancer)	Best Supporting Actor	2017	Won
Three Billboards Outside Ebbing, Missouri	Frances McDormand	Mildred Hayes	Woody Harrelson as Sheriff Bill Willoughby (Pancreatic Cancer)	Best Lead Actress	2017	Won
Tommy	Ann-Margret	Nora Walker	Roger Daltrey as Tommy Walker (Catatonia)	Best Lead Actress	1975	Nominated
Torch Song	Marjorie Rambeau	Mrs. Stewart	Michael Wilding as Tye Graham (Blind)	Best Supporting Actress	1953	Nominated
Traffic	Benicio Del Toro	Javier Rodríguez-Rodríguez	Erika Christensen as Caroline Wakefield (Substance Use Disorder)	Best Supporting Actor	2000	Won
Volver	Penélope Cruz	Raimunda	Blanca Portillo as Agustina (Terminal Cancer)	Best Lead Actress	2006	Nominated
Volver	Penélope Cruz	Raimunda	Chus Lampreave as Aunt Paula (Dementia i.e. Alzheimer’s Disease)	Best Lead Actress	2006	Nominated
The Whales of August	Ann Sothern	Letitia "Tisha" Benson-Doughty	Bette Davis as Elizabeth Mae "Libby" Logan-Strong (Terminal Illness)	Best Supporting Actress	1987	Nominated
What's Eating Gilbert Grape?	Leonardo DiCaprio	Arnold "Arnie" Grape	Darlene Cates as Bonnie Grape (Morbid Obesity)	Best Supporting Actor	1993	Nominated

== Oscar-nominated actors with disabilities ==
Actor	Affliction	Film	Character	Category	Year	Status
Nick Adams	Substance Use Disorder (SUD)	Twilight of Honor	Ben Brown	Best Supporting Actor	1963	Nominated
Alan Alda	Polio	The Aviator	Sen. Owen Brewster	Best Supporting Actor	2004	Nominated
Ann-Margret	Alcoholism	Carnal Knowledge	Bobbie	Best Supporting Actress	1971	Nominated
Ann-Margret	Alcoholism	Tommy	Nora Walker	Best Lead Actress	1975	Nominated
Eddie Albert	Alzheimer's Disease (AD)	Roman Holiday	Irving Radovich	Best Supporting Actor	1953	Nominated
Eddie Albert	Alzheimer's Disease (AD)	The Heartbreak Kid	Mr. Duane Corcoran	Best Supporting Actor	1972	Nominated
Dan Aykroyd	Tourette Syndrome (TS)	Driving Miss Daisy	Boolie Werthan	Best Supporting Actor	1989	Nominated
Lew Ayres	Coma	Johnny Belinda	Dr. Robert Richardson	Best Lead Actor	1948	Nominated
Kim Basinger	Panic Disorder	L.A. Confidential	Lynn Bracken	Best Supporting Actress	1997	Nominated
Warner Baxter	Pneumonia	In Old Arizona	The Cisco Kid	Best Lead Actor	1928/ 1929	Won
Ned Beatty	Bipolar Disorder (BD)	Network	Arthur Jensen	Best Supporting Actor	1976	Nominated
Halle Berry	Diabetes	Monster's Ball	Leticia Musgrove	Best Lead Actress	2001	Won
Mary J. Blige	Alcoholism	Mudbound	Florence Jackson	Best Supporting Actress	2017	Nominated
Jeff Bridges	Long COVID	The Last Picture Show	Duane Jackson	Best Supporting Actor	1971	Nominated
Jeff Bridges	Long COVID	Thunderbolt and Lightfoot	Lightfoot	Best Supporting Actor	1974	Nominated
Jeff Bridges	Long COVID	Starman	Starman (via Scott Hayden)	Best Lead Actor	1984	Nominated
Jeff Bridges	Long COVID	The Contender	Pres. Jackson Evans	Best Supporting Actor	2000	Nominated
Jeff Bridges	Long COVID	Crazy Heart	Otis "Bad" Blake	Best Lead Actor	2009	Won
Jeff Bridges	Long COVID	True Grit	Reuben J. “Rooster” Cogburn	Best Lead Actor	2010	Nominated
Jeff Bridges	Long COVID	Hell or High Water	TXR Marcus Hamilton	Best Supporting Actor	2016	Nominated
Richard Burton	Cirrhosis	My Cousin Rachel	Philip Ashley	Best Supporting Actor	1952	Nominated
Richard Burton	Cirrhosis	The Robe	Marcellus Gallio	Best Lead Actor	1953	Nominated
Richard Burton	Cirrhosis	Becket	Abp. Thomas Becket	Best Lead Actor	1964	Nominated
Richard Burton	Cirrhosis	The Spy Who Came in from the Cold	Alec Leamas	Best Lead Actor	1965	Nominated
Richard Burton	Cirrhosis	Who's Afraid of Virginia Woolf?	George	Best Lead Actor	1966	Nominated
Richard Burton	Cirrhosis	Anne of the Thousand Days	King Henry VIII	Best Lead Actor	1969	Nominated
Richard Burton	Cirrhosis	Equus	Martin Dysart	Best Lead Actor	1977	Nominated
Gary Busey	Cocaine Dependence (CD)	The Buddy Holly Story	Buddy Holly	Best Lead Actor	1978	Nominated
Nicolas Cage	Obsessive-Compulsive Disorder (OCD)	Leaving Las Vegas	Ben Sanderson	Best Lead Actor	1995	Won
Nicolas Cage	Obsessive-Compulsive Disorder (OCD)	Adaptation.	Charlie Kaufman / Donald Kaufman	Best Lead Actor	2002	Nominated
Art Carney	SUD	Harry and Tonto	Harry Coombes	Best Lead Actor	1974	Won
John Cassavetes	Cirrhosis	The Dirty Dozen	Victor R. Franko (#11)	Best Supporting Actor	1967	Nominated
Seymour Cassel	AD	Faces	Chet	Best Supporting Actor	1968	Nominated
Cher	Dyscalculia	Silkwood	Dolly Pelliker	Best Supporting Actress	1983	Nominated
Cher	Dyscalculia	Moonstruck	Loretta Castorini	Best Lead Actress	1987	Won
George Clooney	Bell's Palsy (BP)	Syriana	Bob Barnes	Best Supporting Actor	2005	Won
George Clooney	Bell's Palsy (BP)	Michael Clayton	Michael Clayton	Best Lead Actor	2007	Nominated
George Clooney	Bell's Palsy (BP)	Up in the Air	Ryan Bingham	Best Lead Actor	2009	Nominated
George Clooney	Bell's Palsy (BP)	The Descendants	Matthew King	Best Lead Actor	2011	Nominated
Pauline Collins	Parkinson's Disease (PD)	Shirley Valentine	Shirley Bradshaw	Best Lead Actress	1989	Nominated
Sean Connery	Dementia	The Untouchables	Jimmy Malone	Best Supporting Actor	1987	Won
Bradley Cooper	Alcoholism	Silver Linings Playbook	Patrizio Solitano Jr.	Best Lead Actor	2012	Nominated
Bradley Cooper	Alcoholism	American Hustle	Richie DiMaso	Best Supporting Actor	2013	Nominated
Bradley Cooper	Alcoholism	American Sniper	Chief Petty Off. Chris Kyle	Best Lead Actor	2014	Nominated
Bradley Cooper	Alcoholism	A Star Is Born	Jackson Maine	Best Lead Actor	2018	Nominated
Bradley Cooper	Alcoholism	Maestro	Leonard Bernstein	Best Lead Actor	2023	Nominated
Tom Cruise	Dyslexia	Born on the Fourth of July	Sgt. Ron Kovic	Best Lead Actor	1989	Nominated
Tom Cruise	Dyslexia	Jerry Maguire	Jerry Maguire	Best Lead Actor	1996	Nominated
Tom Cruise	Dyslexia	Magnolia	Frank T.J. Mackey	Best Supporting Actor	1999	Nominated
Jamie Lee Curtis	Opiod Use Disorder (OUD)	Everything, Everywhere, All at Once	Deirdre Beaubeirdre	Best Supporting Actress	2022	Won
Doris Day	Pneumonia	Pillow Talk	Jan Morrow	Best Lead Actress	1959	Nominated
James Dean	Alcoholism	East of Eden	Cal Trask	Best Lead Actor	1955	Nominated
James Dean	Alcoholism	Giant	Jett Rink	Best Lead Actor	1956	Nominated
Gérard Depardieu	Alcoholism	Cyrano De Bergerac	Cyrano De Bergerac	Best Lead Actor	1990	Nominated
Johnny Depp	Alcoholism	Pirates of the Caribbean: The Curse of the Black Pearl	Capt. Jack Sparrow	Best Lead Actor	2003	Nominated
Johnny Depp	Alcoholism	Finding Neverland	James M. Barrie	Best Lead Actor	2004	Nominated
Johnny Depp	Alcoholism	Sweeney Todd: The Demon Barber of Fleet Street	Sweeney Todd	Best Lead Actor	2007	Nominated
Leonardo DiCaprio	OCD	What's Eating Gilbert Grape?	Arnold "Arnie" Grape	Best Supporting Actor	1993	Nominated
Leonardo DiCaprio	OCD	The Aviator	Howard Hughes	Best Lead Actor	2004	Nominated
Leonardo DiCaprio	OCD	Blood Diamond	Danny Archer	Best Lead Actor	2006	Nominated
Leonardo DiCaprio	OCD	The Wolf of Wall Street	Jordan Belfort	Best Lead Actor	2013	Nominated
Leonardo DiCaprio	OCD	The Revenant	Hugh Glass	Best Lead Actor	2015	Won
Leonardo DiCaprio	OCD	Once Upon a Time…in Hollywood	Rick Dalton	Best Lead Actor	2019	Nominated
Leonardo DiCaprio	OCD	One Battle After Another	Bob Ferguson	Best Lead Actor	2025	Nominated
Richard Dix	Alcoholism	Cimarron	Yancey Cravat	Best Lead Actor	1930/ 1931	Nominated
Robert Downey Jr.	SUD	Chaplin	Charlie Chaplin / "The Tramp"	Best Lead Actor	1992	Nominated
Robert Downey Jr.	SUD	Tropic Thunder	Kirk Lazarus	Best Supporting Actor	2008	Nominated
Robert Downey Jr.	SUD	Oppenheimer	Lewis Strauss	Best Supporting Actor	2023	Won
Richard Dreyfuss	BD	The Goodbye Girl	Elliott Garfield (King Richard III)	Best Lead Actor	1977	Won
Richard Dreyfuss	BD	Mr. Holland's Opus	Glenn Holland	Best Lead Actor	1995	Nominated
Patty Duke	BD	The Miracle Worker	Helen Keller	Best Supporting Actress	1962	Nominated
Faye Dunaway	BD	Bonnie and Clyde	Bonnie Parker	Best Lead Actress	1967	Nominated
Faye Dunaway	BD	Chinatown	Evelyn Cross-Mulwray	Best Lead Actress	1974	Nominated
Faye Dunaway	BD	Network	Diana Christensen	Best Lead Actress	1976	Won
Michael Dunn	Dwarfism	Ship of Fools	Glocken	Best Supporting Actor	1965	Nominated
Kirsten Dunst	CD	The Power of the Dog	Rose Gordon	Best Supporting Actress	2021	Nominated
Jeanne Eagels	Alcoholism	The Letter	Leslie Crosbie	Best Lead Actress	1928/ 1929	Nominated
Denholm Elliott	HIV/AIDS	A Room with a View	Mr. George Emerson	Best Supporting Actor	1986	Nominated
Peter Falk	AD	Murder, Inc.	Abe Reles	Best Supporting Actor	1960	Nominated
Peter Falk	AD	Pocketful of Miracles	Joy Boy	Best Supporting Actor	1961	Nominated
Colin Farrell	SUD	The Banshees of Inisherin	Pádraic Súilleabháin	Best Lead Actor	2022	Nominated
Sally Field	Anorexia Nervosa (AN)	Norma Rae	Norma Rae Webster	Best Lead Actress	1979	Won
Sally Field	Anorexia Nervosa (AN)	Places in the Heart	Edna Spalding	Best Lead Actress	1984	Won
Sally Field	Anorexia Nervosa (AN)	Lincoln	Mary Todd Lincoln	Best Supporting Actress	2012	Nominated
Geraldine Fitzgerald	AD	Wuthering Heights	Isabella Linton	Best Supporting Actress	1939	Nominated
Jane Fonda	Bulimia Nervosa (BN)	They Shoot Horses, Don't They?	Gloria Beatty	Best Lead Actress	1969	Nominated
Jane Fonda	Bulimia Nervosa (BN)	Klute	Bree Daniels	Best Lead Actress	1971	Won
Jane Fonda	Bulimia Nervosa (BN)	Julia	Lillian Hellman	Best Lead Actress	1977	Nominated
Jane Fonda	Bulimia Nervosa (BN)	Coming Home	Sally Bender-Hyde	Best Lead Actress	1978	Won
Jane Fonda	Bulimia Nervosa (BN)	The China Syndrome	Kimberly Wells	Best Lead Actress	1979	Nominated
Jane Fonda	Bulimia Nervosa (BN)	On Golden Pond	Chelsea Thayer-Wayne	Best Supporting Actor	1981	Nominated
Jane Fonda	Bulimia Nervosa (BN)	The Morning After	Alexandra Sternbergen a.k.a. Vivica Van Loren	Best Lead Actress	1986	Nominated
Peter Fonda	SUD	Ulee's Gold	Ulysses "Ulee" Jackson	Best Lead Actor	1997	Nominated
Harrison Ford	Major Depressive Disorder (MDD)	Witness	Det. Capt. John Book	Best Lead Actor	1985	Nominated
Leonard Frey	HIV/AIDS	Fiddler on the Roof	Motel Kamzoil	Best Supporting Actor	1971	Nominated
Greta Garbo	Pneumonia	Anna Christie	Anna Christie	Best Lead Actress	1929/ 1930	Nominated
Greta Garbo	Pneumonia	Romance	Madame Rita Cavallini	Best Lead Actress	1929/ 1930	Nominated
Greta Garbo	Pneumonia	Camille	Marguerite Gautier	Best Lead Actress	1937	Nominated
Greta Garbo	Pneumonia	Ninotchka	Nina Ivanova "Ninotchka" Yakushova	Best Lead Actress	1939	Nominated
Ava Gardner	Kidney Stone Disease (KSD)	Mogambo	Eloise "Honey Bear" Kelly	Best Lead Actress	1953	Nominated
Judy Garland	Alcoholism	A Star Is Born	Vicki Lester (née Esther Blodgett)	Best Lead Actress	1954	Nominated
Judy Garland	Alcoholism	Judgment at Nuremberg	Irene Hoffmann	Best Supporting Actress	1961	Nominated
James Garner	MDD	Murphy's Romance	Murphy Jones	Best Lead Actor	1985	Nominated
Teri Garr	Multiple Sclerosis (MS)	Tootsie	Sandy Lester	Best Supporting Actress	1982	Nominated
Gladys George	Cirrhosis	Valiant Is the Word for Carrie	Carrie Snyder	Best Lead Actress	1936	Nominated
Paulette Goddard	Emphysema	So Proudly We Hail!	Lt. Joan O'Doul	Best Supporting Actress	1943	Nominated
Whoopi Goldberg	Aerophobia	The Color Purple	Celie Harris-Johnson	Best Lead Actress	1985	Nominated
Whoopi Goldberg	Aerophobia	Ghost	Oda Mae Brown	Best Supporting Actress	1990	Won
Ryan Gosling	Attention Deficit Hyperactivity Disorder (ADHD)	Half Nelson	Dan Dunne	Best Lead Actor	2006	Nominated
Ryan Gosling	Attention Deficit Hyperactivity Disorder (ADHD)	La La Land	Sebastian Wilder	Best Lead Actor	2016	Nominated
Ryan Gosling	Attention Deficit Hyperactivity Disorder (ADHD)	Barbie	Ken	Best Supporting Actor	2023	Nominated
Gloria Grahame	Peritonitis	Crossfire	Ginny Tremaine	Best Supporting Actress	1947	Nominated
Gloria Grahame	Peritonitis	The Bad and the Beautiful	Rosemary Bartlow	Best Supporting Actress	1952	Won
Ariana Grande	Post-Traumatic Stress Disorder (PTSD)	Wicked	Galinda “Glinda” Upland	Best Supporting Actress	2024	Nominated
Cary Grant	MDD	Penny Serenade	Roger Adams	Best Lead Actor	1941	Nominated
Cary Grant	MDD	None but the Lonely Heart	Ernie Mott	Best Lead Actor	1944	Nominated
Melanie Griffith	Epilepsy	Working Girl	Tess McGill	Best Lead Actress	1988	Nominated
Gene Hackman	AD	Bonnie and Clyde	Buck Barrow	Best Supporting Actor	1967	Nominated
Gene Hackman	AD	I Never Sang for My Father	Gene Garrison	Best Supporting Actor	1970	Nominated
Gene Hackman	AD	The French Connection	Det. Jimmy "Popeye" Doyle	Best Lead Actor	1971	Won
Gene Hackman	AD	Mississippi Burning	FBI Agent Rupert Anderson	Best Lead Actor	1988	Nominated
Gene Hackman	AD	Unforgiven	Sheriff William "Little Bill" Daggett	Best Supporting Actor	1992	Won
Jean Hagen	Alcoholism	Singin' in the Rain	Lina Lamont	Best Supporting Actress	1952	Nominated
Tom Hanks	Diabetes	Big	Josh Baskin	Best Lead Actor	1998	Nominated
Tom Hanks	Diabetes	Philadelphia	Andrew Beckett	Best Lead Actor	1993	Won
Tom Hanks	Diabetes	Forrest Gump	Forrest Gump	Best Lead Actor	1994	Won
Tom Hanks	Diabetes	Saving Private Ryan	Capt. John H. Miller	Best Lead Actor	1998	Nominated
Tom Hanks	Diabetes	Cast Away	Chuck Noland	Best Lead Actor	2000	Nominated
Tom Hanks	Diabetes	A Beautiful Day in the Neighborhood	Mr. Fred Rogers	Best Supporting Actor	2019	Nominated
Tom Hardy	Autism	The Revenant	John Fitzgerald	Best Supporting Actor	2015	Nominated
Ed Harris	Alcoholism	Apollo 13	Gene Kranz	Best Supporting Actor	1995	Nominated
Ed Harris	Alcoholism	The Truman Show	Christof	Best Supporting Actor	1998	Nominated
Ed Harris	Alcoholism	Pollock	Jackson Pollock	Best Lead Actor	2000	Nominated
Ed Harris	Alcoholism	The Hours	Richard Brown	Best Supporting Actor	2002	Nominated
Woody Harrelson	ADHD	The People vs. Larry Flynt	Larry Flynt	Best Lead Actor	1996	Nominated
Woody Harrelson	ADHD	The Messenger	Capt. Anthony Stone	Best Supporting Actor	2009	Nominated
Woody Harrelson	ADHD	Three Billboards Outside Ebbing, Missouri	Sheriff Bill Willoughby	Best Supporting Actor	2017	Nominated
Anne Hathaway	Somatic Symptom Disorder (SSD)	Rachel Getting Married	Kym Buchanan	Best Lead Actress	2008	Nominated
Anne Hathaway	Somatic Symptom Disorder (SSD)	Les Misérables	Fantine	Best Supporting Actor	2012	Won
Ethan Hawke	Autism	Training Day	Jake Hoyt	Best Supporting Actor	2001	Nominated
Ethan Hawke	Autism	Boyhood	Mason Evans Sr.	Best Supporting Actor	2014	Nominated
Ethan Hawke	Autism	Blue Moon	Lorenz Hart	Best Lead Actor	2025	Nominated
Sally Hawkins	Lupus	Blue Jasmine	Ginger	Best Supporting Actress	2013	Nominated
Sally Hawkins	Lupus	The Shape of Water	Elisa Esposito	Best Lead Actress	2017	Nominated
Salma Hayek	Dyslexia	Frida	Frida Kahlo	Best Lead Actress	2002	Nominated
Audrey Hepburn	MDD	Roman Holiday	Crown Princess Ann (a.k.a. Anya "Smitty" Smith)	Best Lead Actress	1953	Won
Audrey Hepburn	MDD	Sabrina	Sabrina Fairchild	Best Lead Actress	1954	Nominated
Audrey Hepburn	MDD	The Nun's Story	Sister Luke (née Gabrielle van der Mal)	Best Lead Actress	1959	Nominated
Audrey Hepburn	MDD	Breakfast at Tiffany's	Holly Golightly	Best Lead Actress	1961	Nominated
Audrey Hepburn	MDD	Wait Until Dark	Susy Hendrix	Best Lead Actress	1967	Nominated
Katharine Hepburn	Dementia	Morning Glory	Eva Lovelace	Best Lead Actress	1932/ 1933	Won
Katharine Hepburn	Dementia	Alice Adams	Alice Adams	Best Lead Actress	1935	Nominated
Katharine Hepburn	Dementia	The Philadelphia Story	Tracy Lord	Best Lead Actress	1940	Nominated
Katharine Hepburn	Dementia	Woman of the Year	Tess Harding	Best Lead Actress	1942	Nominated
Katharine Hepburn	Dementia	The African Queen	Rose Sayer	Best Lead Actress	1951	Nominated
Katharine Hepburn	Dementia	Summertime	Jane Hudson	Best Lead Actress	1955	Nominated
Katharine Hepburn	Dementia	The Rainmaker	Elizabeth "Lizzie" Curry	Best Lead Actress	1956	Nominated
Katharine Hepburn	Dementia	Suddenly, Last Summer	Violet "Vi" Venable	Best Lead Actress	1959	Nominated
Katharine Hepburn	Dementia	Long Day's Journey into Night	Mary Tyrone	Best Lead Actress	1962	Nominated
Katharine Hepburn	Dementia	Guess Who's Coming to Dinner?	Christina Drayton	Best Lead Actress	1967	Won
Katharine Hepburn	Dementia	The Lion in Winter	Queen Eleanor of Aquitaine	Best Lead Actress	1968	Won
Katharine Hepburn	Dementia	On Golden Pond	Ethel Thayer	Best Lead Actress	1981	Won
Charlton Heston	AD	Ben-Hur	Judah Ben-Hur	Best Lead Actor	1959	Won
Philip Seymour Hoffman	SUD	Capote	Truman Capote	Best Lead Actor	2005	Won
Philip Seymour Hoffman	SUD	Charlie Wilson's War	Gust Avrakotos	Best Supporting Actor	2007	Nominated
Philip Seymour Hoffman	SUD	Doubt	Father Brendan Flynn	Best Supporting Actor	2008	Nominated
Philip Seymour Hoffman	SUD	The Master	Lancaster Dodd	Best Supporting Actor	2012	Nominated
William Holden	Alcoholism	Sunset Boulevard	Joe Gillis	Best Lead Actor	1950	Nominated
William Holden	Alcoholism	Stalag 17	Sgt. J.J. Sefton	Best Lead Actor	1953	Won
William Holden	Alcoholism	Network	Max Schumacher	Best Lead Actor	1976	Nominated
Ian Holm	PD	Chariots of Fire	Sam Mussabini	Best Supporting Actor	1981	Nominated
Anthony Hopkins	Asperger Syndrome (ASD)	The Silence of the Lambs	Dr. Hannibal Lecter	Best Lead Actor	1991	Won
Anthony Hopkins	Asperger Syndrome (ASD)	The Remains of the Day	James Stevens	Best Lead Actor	1993	Nominated
Anthony Hopkins	Asperger Syndrome (ASD)	Nixon	President Richard Nixon	Best Lead Actor	1995	Nominated
Anthony Hopkins	Asperger Syndrome (ASD)	Amistad	President John Quincy Adams	Best Supporting Actor	1997	Nominated
Anthony Hopkins	Asperger Syndrome (ASD)	The Two Popes	Pope Benedict XVI	Best Supporting Actor	2019	Nominated
Anthony Hopkins	Asperger Syndrome (ASD)	The Father	Anthony Evans	Best Lead Actor	2020/ 2021	Won
Dennis Hopper	SUD	Hoosiers	Wilbur "Shooter" Flatch	Best Supporting Actor	1986	Nominated
Bob Hoskins	PD	Mona Lisa	George	Best Lead Actor	1986	Nominated
Terrence Howard	BP	Hustle & Flow	DJay	Best Lead Actor	2005	Nominated
Trevor Howard	Cirrhosis	Sons and Lovers	Walter Morel	Best Lead Actor	1960	Nominated
Rock Hudson	HIV/AIDS	Giant	Jordan "Bick" Benedict Jr.	Best Lead Actor	1956	Nominated
Felicity Huffman	AN	TransAmerica	Sabrina "Bree" Osbourne (né Stanley Schupak)	Best Lead Actress	2005	Nominated
Linda Hunt	Dwarfism	The Year of Living Dangerously	Billy Kwan	Best Supporting Actress	1983	Won
Samuel L. Jackson	SUD	Pulp Fiction	Jules Winnfield	Best Supporting Actor	1994	Nominated
Scarlett Johansson	Generalized Anxiety Disorder (GAD)	Marriage Story	Nicole Barber	Best Lead Actress	2019	Nominated
Scarlett Johansson	Generalized Anxiety Disorder (GAD)	Jojo Rabbit	Rosie Betzler	Best Supporting Actress	2019	Nominated
Angelina Jolie	Borderline Personality Disorder (BPD)	Girl, Interrupted	Lisa Rowe	Best Supporting Actress	1999	Won
Angelina Jolie	Borderline Personality Disorder (BPD)	Changeling	Christine Collins	Best Lead Actress	2008	Nominated
Diane Keaton	Pneumonia	Annie Hall	Annie Hall	Best Lead Actress	1977	Won
Diane Keaton	Pneumonia	Reds	Louise Bryant	Best Lead Actress	1981	Nominated
Diane Keaton	Pneumonia	Marvin's Room	Bessie Wakefield	Best Lead Actress	1996	Nominated
Diane Keaton	Pneumonia	Something's Gotta Give	Erica Barry	Best Lead Actress	2003	Nominated
Sally Kellerman	Dementia	M*A*S*H	Maj. Margaret “Hot Lips” Houlihan	Best Supporting Actress	1970	Nominated
Nancy Kelly	Diabetes	The Bad Seed	Christine Penmark	Best Lead Actress	1956	Nominated
Barry Keoghan	ADHD	The Banshees of Inisherin	Dominic Kearney	Best Supporting Actor	2022	Nominated
Deborah Kerr	PD	Edward, My Son	Evelyn Boult	Best Lead Actress	1949	Nominated
Deborah Kerr	PD	From Here to Eternity	Karen Holmes	Best Lead Actress	1953	Nominated
Deborah Kerr	PD	The King and I	Anna Leonowens	Best Lead Actress	1956	Nominated
Deborah Kerr	PD	Heaven Knows, Mr. Allison	Sister Angela	Best Lead Actress	1957	Nominated
Deborah Kerr	PD	Separate Tables	Sibyl Railton-Bell	Best Lead Actress	1958	Nominated
Deborah Kerr	PD	The Sundowners	Ida Carmody	Best Lead Actress	1960	Nominated
Nicole Kidman	Panic Disorder	Moulin Rouge!	Satine	Best Lead Actress	2001	Nominated
Nicole Kidman	Panic Disorder	The Hours	Virginia Woolf	Best Lead Actress	2002	Won
Nicole Kidman	Panic Disorder	Rabbit Hole	Becca Corbett	Best Lead Actress	2010	Nominated
Nicole Kidman	Panic Disorder	Lion	Sue Brierley	Best Supporting Actress	2016	Nominated
Nicole Kidman	Panic Disorder	Being the Ricardos	Lucille Ball	Best Lead Actress	2021	Nominated
Sally Kirkland	Dementia	Anna	Anna	Best Lead Actress	1987	Nominated
Keira Knightley	Dyslexia	Pride & Prejudice	Elizabeth Bennet	Best Lead Actress	2005	Nominated
Keira Knightley	Dyslexia	The Imitation Game	Joan Clarke	Best Supporting Actress	2014	Nominated
Troy Kotsur	Deafness	CODA	Frank Rossi	Best Supporting Actor	2021	Won
Lady Gaga	Fibromyalgia	A Star Is Born	Ally Maine (née Campano)	Best Lead Actress	2018	Nominated
Jocelyne LaGarde	Amputee	Hawaii	Queen Malama Kanakoa, Ali'i Nui	Best Supporting Actress	1966	Nominated
Jessica Lange	MDD	Tootsie	Julie Nichols	Best Supporting Actress	1982	Won
Jessica Lange	MDD	Frances	Frances Farmer	Best Lead Actress	1982	Nominated
Jessica Lange	MDD	Country	Jewell Ivy	Best Lead Actress	1984	Nominated
Jessica Lange	MDD	Sweet Dreams	Patsy Cline	Best Lead Actress	1985	Nominated
Jessica Lange	MDD	Music Box	Ann Talbot	Best Lead Actress	1989	Nominated
Jessica Lange	MDD	Blue Sky	Carly Marshall	Best Lead Actress	1994	Won
Angela Lansbury	Osteoarthritis	Gaslight	Nancy Oliver	Best Supporting Actress	1944	Nominated
Angela Lansbury	Osteoarthritis	The Picture of Dorian Gray	Sybil Vane	Best Supporting Actress	1945	Nominated
Angela Lansbury	Osteoarthritis	The Manchurian Candidate	Eleanor Shaw-Iselin	Best Supporting Actress	1962	Nominated
Jennifer Lawrence	Social Anxiety Disorder (SAD)	Winter's Bone	Ruthie "Ree" Dolly	Best Lead Actress	2010	Nominated
Jennifer Lawrence	Social Anxiety Disorder (SAD)	Silver Linings Playbook	Tiffany Maxwell	Best Lead Actress	2012	Won
Jennifer Lawrence	Social Anxiety Disorder (SAD)	American Hustle	Rosalyn Rosenfeld	Best Supporting Actress	2013	Nominated
Jennifer Lawrence	Social Anxiety Disorder (SAD)	Joy	Joy Mangano	Best Lead Actress	2015	Nominated
Heath Ledger	GAD	Brokeback Mountain	Ennis Del Mar	Best Lead Actor	2005	Nominated
Heath Ledger	GAD	The Dark Knight	The Joker	Best Supporting Actor	2008	Won
Vivien Leigh	BD	Gone with the Wind	Scarlett O'Hara	Best Lead Actress	1939	Won
Vivien Leigh	BD	A Streetcar Named Desire	Blanche DuBois	Best Lead Actress	1951	Won
Margaret Leighton	MS	The Go-Between	Mrs. Maudsley	Best Supporting Actress	1971	Nominated
Robert Loggia	AD	Jagged Edge	Sam Ransom	Best Supporting Actor	1985	Nominated
Lee Marvin	Alcoholism	Cat Ballou	Kid Shelleen / Tim Strawn	Best Lead Actor	1965	Won
Marlee Matlin	Deafness	Children of a Lesser God	Sarah Norman	Best Lead Actress	1986	Won
Vivien Merchant	Alcoholism	Alfie	Lily Clamacraft	Best Supporting Actress	1966	Nominated
Burgess Meredith	Cyclothymia	The Day of the Locust	Harry Greener	Best Supporting Actor	1975	Nominated
Burgess Meredith	Cyclothymia	Rocky	Mickey Goldmill	Best Supporting Actor	1976	Nominated
Sarah Miles	Dyslexia	Ryan's Daughter	Rosy Ryan	Best Lead Actress	1970	Nominated
Liza Minnelli	Tinnitus	The Sterile Cuckoo	Mary Ann "Pookie" Adams	Best Lead Actress	1969	Nominated
Liza Minnelli	Tinnitus	Cabaret	Sally Bowles	Best Lead Actress	1972	Won
Mary Tyler Moore	Diabetes	Ordinary People	Beth Jarrett	Best Lead Actress	1980	Nominated
Pat Morita	Alcoholism	The Karate Kid	Mr. Miyagi	Best Supporting Actor	1984	Nominated
David Niven	ALS (Lou Gehrig's Disease)	Separate Tables	Maj. David Angus Pollock	Best Lead Actor	1958	Won
Nick Nolte	SUD	The Prince of Tides	Tom Wingo	Best Lead Actor	1991	Nominated
Nick Nolte	SUD	Affliction	Wade Whitehouse	Best Lead Actor	1998	Nominated
Nick Nolte	SUD	Warrior	Paddy Conlon	Best Supporting Actor	2011	Nominated
Edmond O'Brien	AD	The Barefoot Contessa	Oscar Muldoon	Best Supporting Actor	1954	Won
Edmond O'Brien	AD	Seven Days in May	Sen. Raymond Clark	Best Supporting Actor	1964	Nominated
Arthur O'Connell	AD	Picnic	Howard Bevans	Best Supporting Actor	1955	Nominated
Arthur O'Connell	AD	Anatomy of a Murder	Parnell Emmett McCarthy	Best Supporting Actor	1959	Nominated
Tatum O'Neal	CD	Paper Moon	Addie Loggins	Best Supporting Actress	1973	Won
Peter O'Toole	Diabetes	Lawrence of Arabia	T.E. Lawrence	Best Lead Actor	1962	Nominated
Peter O'Toole	Diabetes	Becket	King Henry II	Best Lead Actor	1964	Nominated
Peter O'Toole	Diabetes	The Lion in Winter	King Henry II	Best Lead Actor	1968	Nominated
Peter O'Toole	Diabetes	Goodbye, Mr. Chips	Mr. Arthur Chipping	Best Lead Actor	1969	Nominated
Peter O'Toole	Diabetes	The Ruling Class	Earl Jack Gurney, 14th	Best Lead Actor	1972	Nominated
Peter O'Toole	Diabetes	The Stunt Man	Eli Cross	Best Lead Actor	1980	Nominated
Peter O'Toole	Diabetes	My Favorite Year	Alan Swann	Best Lead Actor	1982	Nominated
Peter O'Toole	Diabetes	Venus	Maurice Russell	Best Lead Actor	2006	Nominated
Edward James Olmos	Dyslexia	Stand and Deliver	Jaime Escalante	Best Lead Actor	1988	Nominated
Al Pacino	Alcoholism	The Godfather – Part I	Michael Corleone	Best Supporting Actor	1972	Nominated
Al Pacino	Alcoholism	Serpico	Det. Frank Serpico	Best Lead Actor	1973	Nominated
Al Pacino	Alcoholism	The Godfather – Part II	Michael Corleone	Best Lead Actor	1974	Nominated
Al Pacino	Alcoholism	Dog Day Afternoon	Sonny Wortzik	Best Lead Actor	1975	Nominated
Al Pacino	Alcoholism	...And Justice for All	Atty. Arthur Kirkland	Best Lead Actor	1979	Nominated
Al Pacino	Alcoholism	Dick Tracy	Alphonse "Big Boy" Caprice	Best Supporting Actor	1990	Nominated
Al Pacino	Alcoholism	Scent of a Woman	Lieut. Col. Frank Slade	Best Lead Actor	1992	Won
Al Pacino	Alcoholism	Glengarry Glen Ross	Richard "Ricky" Roma	Best Supporting Actor	1992	Nominated
Al Pacino	Alcoholism	The Irishman	Jimmy Hoffa	Best Supporting Actor	2019	Nominated
Gregory Peck	Pneumonia	The Keys of the Kingdom	Father Francis Chisholm	Best Lead Actor	1945	Nominated
Gregory Peck	Pneumonia	The Yearling	Ezra "Penny" Baxter	Best Lead Actor	1946	Nominated
Gregory Peck	Pneumonia	Gentleman's Agreement	Philip Schuyler Green	Best Lead Actor	1947	Nominated
Gregory Peck	Pneumonia	Twelve O'Clock High	Brig. Gen. Frank Savage	Best Lead Actor	1949	Nominated
Gregory Peck	Pneumonia	To Kill a Mockingbird	Atticus Finch	Best Lead Actor	1962	Won
Anthony Perkins	HIV/AIDS	Friendly Persuasion	Joshua Birdwell	Best Supporting Actor	1988	Nominated
Valerie Perrine	PD	Lenny	Honey Bruce	Best Lead Actress	1974	Nominated
River Phoenix	OUD	Running on Empty	Danny Pope	Best Supporting Actor	1988	Nominated
Brad Pitt	Prosopagnosia	12 Monkeys	Jeffrey Goines	Best Supporting Actor	1995	Nominated
Brad Pitt	Prosopagnosia	The Curious Case of Benjamin Button	Benjamin Button	Best Lead Actor	2008	Nominated
Brad Pitt	Prosopagnosia	Moneyball	Billy Beane	Best Lead Actor	2011	Nominated
Brad Pitt	Prosopagnosia	Once Upon a Time…in Hollywood	Cliff Booth	Best Supporting Actor	2019	Won
Joan Plowright	Legally Blind	Enchanted April	Mrs. Jane Fisher	Best Supporting Actress	1992	Nominated
Luise Rainer	Pneumonia	The Great Ziegfeld	Anna Held	Best Lead Actress	1936	Won
Luise Rainer	Pneumonia	The Good Earth	O-Lan	Best Lead Actress	1937	Won
Claude Rains	Cirrhosis	Mr. Smith Goes to Washington	Sen. Joseph Harrison Paine	Best Supporting Actor	1939	Nominated
Claude Rains	Cirrhosis	Casablanca	Capt. Louis Renault	Best Supporting Actor	1943	Nominated
Claude Rains	Cirrhosis	Mr. Skeffington	Mr. Job Skeffington	Best Supporting Actor	1944	Nominated
Claude Rains	Cirrhosis	Notorious	Alexander Sebastian	Best Supporting Actor	1946	Nominated
Marjorie Rambeau	Alcoholism	Primrose Path	Mamie Adams	Best Supporting Actress	1940	Nominated
Marjorie Rambeau	Alcoholism	Torch Song	Mrs. Stewart	Best Supporting Actress	1953	Nominated
Michael Redgrave	PD	Mourning Becomes Electra	Orin Mannon	Best Lead Actor	1947	Nominated
Burt Reynolds	KSD	Boogie Nights	Jack Horner	Best Supporting Actor	1997	Nominated
Thelma Ritter	Myocardial Infarction (MI)	All About Eve	Birdie Coonan	Best Supporting Actress	1950	Nominated
Thelma Ritter	Myocardial Infarction (MI)	The Mating Season	Ellen McNulty	Best Supporting Actress	1951	Nominated
Thelma Ritter	Myocardial Infarction (MI)	With a Song in My Heart	Clancy	Best Supporting Actress	1952	Nominated
Thelma Ritter	Myocardial Infarction (MI)	Pickup on South Street	Moe Williams	Best Supporting Actress	1953	Nominated
Thelma Ritter	Myocardial Infarction (MI)	Pillow Talk	Alma	Best Supporting Actress	1959	Nominated
Thelma Ritter	Myocardial Infarction (MI)	Birdman of Alcatraz	Elizabeth Stroud	Best Supporting Actress	1962	Nominated
Jason Robards Jr.	Alcoholism	All the President's Men	Ben Bradlee	Best Supporting Actor	1976	Won
Jason Robards Jr.	Alcoholism	Julia	Dashiell Hammett	Best Supporting Actor	1977	Won
Jason Robards Jr.	Alcoholism	Melvin (and Howard)	Howard Hughes	Best Supporting Actor	1980	Nominated
Howard E. Rollins Jr.	HIV/AIDS	Ragtime	Coalhouse Walker Jr.	Best Supporting Actor	1981	Nominated
Gena Rowlands	AD	A Woman Under the Influence	Mabel Longhetti	Best Lead Actress	1974	Nominated
Gena Rowlands	AD	Gloria	Gloria Swenson	Best Lead Actress	1980	Nominated
Mark Ruffalo	ADHD	The Kids Are All Right	Paul Hatfield	Best Supporting Actor	2010	Nominated
Mark Ruffalo	ADHD	Foxcatcher	Dave Schultz	Best Supporting Actor	2014	Nominated
Mark Ruffalo	ADHD	Spotlight	Michael Rezendes	Best Supporting Actor	2015	Nominated
Mark Ruffalo	ADHD	Poor Things	Duncan Wedderburn	Best Supporting Actor	2023	Nominated
Harold Russell	Amputee	The Best Years of Our Lives	Homer Parrish	Best Supporting Actor	1946	Won
Margaret Rutherford	AD	The V.I.P.s	The Duchess Of Brighton	Best Supporting Actress	1963	Won
Winona Ryder	GAD	The Age of Innocence	May Welland	Best Supporting Actress	1993	Nominated
Winona Ryder	GAD	Little Women	Josephine “Jo” March	Best Lead Actress	1994	Nominated
Zoe Saldaña	Dyslexia	Emilia Pérez	Rita Mora Castro	Best Supporting Actress	2024	Won
Amanda Seyfried	GAD	Mank	Marion Davies	Best Supporting Actress	2020/ 2021	Nominated
Omar Sharif	AD	Lawrence of Arabia	Sherif Ali Ibn El Kharish	Best Supporting Actor	1962	Nominated
Robert Shaw	Alcoholism	A Man for All Seasons	King Henry VIII	Best Supporting Actor	1966	Nominated
Norma Shearer	Pneumonia	The Divorcée	Jerry Martin née Bernard	Best Lead Actress	1929/ 1930	Won
Norma Shearer	Pneumonia	Their Own Desire	Lucia "Lally" Marlett	Best Lead Actress	1929/ 1930	Nominated
Norma Shearer	Pneumonia	A Free Soul	Jan Ashe	Best Lead Actress	1930/ 1931	Nominated
Norma Shearer	Pneumonia	The Barretts of Wimpole Street	Elizabeth Barrett-Browning	Best Lead Actress	1934	Nominated
Norma Shearer	Pneumonia	Romeo and Juliet	Juliet Capulet	Best Lead Actress	1936	Nominated
Norma Shearer	Pneumonia	Marie-Antoinette	Marie-Antoinette	Best Lead Actress	1938	Nominated
Sam Shepard	ALS	The Right Stuff	Brig. Gen. Chuck Yeager, USAF	Best Supporting Actor	1983	Nominated
Frank Sinatra	BD	From Here to Eternity	Angelo Maggio	Best Supporting Actor	1953	Won
Frank Sinatra	BD	The Man with the Golden Arm	Frankie Machine	Best Lead Actor	1955	Nominated
Kodi Smit-McPhee	Ankylosing Spondylitis (AS)	The Power of the Dog	Peter Gordon	Best Supporting Actor	2021	Nominated
Will Smith	Dyslexia	Ali	Muhammad Ali	Best Lead Actor	2001	Nominated
Will Smith	Dyslexia	The Pursuit of Happyness	Chris Gardner	Best Lead Actor	2006	Nominated
Will Smith	Dyslexia	King Richard	Richard Williams	Best Lead Actor	2021	Won
Octavia Spencer	Dyslexia	The Help	Minny Jackson	Best Supporting Actress	2011	Won
Octavia Spencer	Dyslexia	Hidden Figures	Dorothy Vaughan	Best Supporting Actress	2016	Nominated
Octavia Spencer	Dyslexia	The Shape of Water	Zelda Delilah Fuller	Best Supporting Actress	2017	Nominated
Sylvester Stallone	Tinnitus	Rocky	Rocky Balboa	Best Lead Actor	1976	Nominated
Sylvester Stallone	Tinnitus	Creed	Rocky Balboa	Best Supporting Actor	2015	Nominated
Terence Stamp	Dementia	Billy Budd	Billy Budd	Best Supporting Actor	1962	Nominated
Barbara Stanwyck	Emphysema	Stella Dallas	Stella Martin-Dallas	Best Lead Actress	1937	Nominated
Barbara Stanwyck	Emphysema	Ball of Fire	Katherine "Sugarpuss" O'Shea	Best Lead Actress	1941	Nominated
Barbara Stanwyck	Emphysema	Double Indemnity	Phyllis Dietrichson	Best Lead Actress	1944	Nominated
Barbara Stanwyck	Emphysema	Sorry, Wrong Number	Leona Stevenson	Best Lead Actress	1948	Nominated
Maureen Stapleton	Alcoholism	Lonelyhearts	Fay Doyle	Best Supporting Actress	1958	Nominated
Maureen Stapleton	Alcoholism	Airport	Inez Guerrero	Best Supporting Actress	1970	Nominated
Maureen Stapleton	Alcoholism	Interiors	Pearl	Best Supporting Actress	1978	Nominated
Maureen Stapleton	Alcoholism	Reds	Emma Goldman	Best Supporting Actress	1981	Won
Rod Steiger	MDD	On the Waterfront	Charlie Malloy	Best Supporting Actor	1954	Nominated
Rod Steiger	MDD	The Pawnbroker	Sol Nazerman	Best Lead Actor	1965	Nominated
Rod Steiger	MDD	In the Heat of the Night	Chief Bill Gillespie	Best Lead Actor	1967	Won
James Stewart	AD	Mr. Smith Goes to Washington	Jefferson Smith	Best Lead Actor	1939	Nominated
James Stewart	AD	The Philadelphia Story	Macaulay "Mike" Connor	Best Lead Actor	1940	Won
James Stewart	AD	It's a Wonderful Life	George Bailey	Best Lead Actor	1946	Nominated
James Stewart	AD	Harvey	Elwood P. Dowd	Best Lead Actor	1950	Nominated
James Stewart	AD	Anatomy of a Murder	Paul Biegler	Best Lead Actor	1959	Nominated
Kristen Stewart	GAD	Spencer	Princess Diana Spencer	Best Lead Actress	2021	Nominated
Emma Stone	SAD	Birdman, or (The Unexpected Virtue of Ignorance)	Sam Thomson	Best Supporting Actress	2014	Nominated
Emma Stone	SAD	La La Land	Amelia "Mia" Dolan	Best Lead Actress	2016	Won
Emma Stone	SAD	The Favourite	Baroness Abigail Masham	Best Supporting Actress	2018	Nominated
Emma Stone	SAD	Poor Things	Bella Baxter	Best Lead Actress	2023	Won
Emma Stone	SAD	Bugonia	Michelle Fuller	Best Lead Actress	2025	Nominated
Sharon Stone	Epilepsy	Casino	Ginger McKenna	Best Lead Actress	1995	Nominated
Beatrice Straight	AD	Network	Louise Schumacher	Best Supporting Actress	1976	Won
Barbra Streisand	SAD	Funny Girl	Fanny Brice	Best Lead Actress	1968	Won
Barbra Streisand	SAD	The Way We Were	Katie Morosky	Best Lead Actress	1973	Nominated
Tilda Swinton	Long COVID	Michael Clayton	Karen Crowder	Best Supporting Actress	2007	Won
Elizabeth Taylor	Alcoholism	Raintree County	Susanna Drake	Best Lead Actress	1957	Nominated
Elizabeth Taylor	Alcoholism	Cat on a Hot Tin Roof	Margaret “Maggie the Cat” Pollitt	Best Lead Actress	1958	Nominated
Elizabeth Taylor	Alcoholism	Suddenly, Last Summer	Catherine Holly	Best Lead Actress	1959	Nominated
Elizabeth Taylor	Alcoholism	BUtterfield 8	Gloria Wandrous	Best Lead Actress	1960	Won
Elizabeth Taylor	Alcoholism	Who's Afraid of Virginia Woolf?	Martha	Best Lead Actress	1966	Won
Charlize Theron	PTSD	Monster	Aileen Wuornos	Best Lead Actress	2003	Won
Charlize Theron	PTSD	North Country	Josey Aimes	Best Lead Actress	2005	Nominated
Charlize Theron	PTSD	Bombshell	Megyn Kelly	Best Lead Actress	2019	Nominated
Emma Thompson	MDD	Howards End	Margaret Schlegel	Best Lead Actress	1992	Won
Emma Thompson	MDD	In the Name of the Father	Gareth Peirce	Best Supporting Actress	1993	Nominated
Emma Thompson	MDD	The Remains of the Day	Miss Sarah "Sally" Kenton (later, Mrs. Benn)	Best Lead Actress	1993	Nominated
Emma Thompson	MDD	Sense and Sensibility	Elinor Dashwood	Best Lead Actress	1995	Nominated
Billy Bob Thornton	OCD	Sling Blade	Karl Childers	Best Lead Actor	1996	Nominated
Billy Bob Thornton	OCD	A Simple Plan	Jacob Mitchell	Best Supporting Actor	1998	Nominated
Uma Thurman	Autism	Pulp Fiction	Mia Wallace	Best Supporting Actress	1994	Nominated
Lawrence Tibbett	Alcoholism	The Rogue Song	Yegor	Best Lead Actor	1929/ 1930	Nominated
Topol	AD	Fiddler on the Roof	Tevye	Best Lead Actor	1971	Nominated
Rip Torn	AD	Cross Creek	Marsh Turner	Best Supporting Actor	1983	Nominated
Spencer Tracy	Alcoholism	San Francisco	Father Tim Mullin	Best Lead Actor	1936	Nominated
Spencer Tracy	Alcoholism	Captains Courageous	Manuel Fidello	Best Lead Actor	1937	Won
Spencer Tracy	Alcoholism	Boys Town	Father Edward J. Flanagan	Best Lead Actor	1938	Won
Spencer Tracy	Alcoholism	Father of the Bride	Stanley T. Banks	Best Lead Actor	1950	Nominated
Spencer Tracy	Alcoholism	Bad Day at Black Rock	John J. Macreedy	Best Lead Actor	1955	Nominated
Spencer Tracy	Alcoholism	The Old Man and the Sea	The Old Man (Narrator)	Best Lead Actor	1958	Nominated
Spencer Tracy	Alcoholism	Inherit the Wind	Henry Drummond	Best Lead Actor	1960	Nominated
Spencer Tracy	Alcoholism	Judgment at Nuremberg	Chief Judge Dan Haywood	Best Lead Actor	1961	Nominated
Spencer Tracy	Alcoholism	Guess Who's Coming to Dinner	Matt Drayton	Best Lead Actor	1967	Nominated
Mary Ure	Alcoholism	Sons and Lovers	Clara Dawes (née Radford)	Best Supporting Actress	1960	Nominated
Diane Varsi	Lyme Disease	Peyton Place	Allison MacKenzie	Best Supporting Actress	1957	Nominated
Gene Wilder	AD	The Producers	Leopold Bloom	Best Supporting Actor	1968	Nominated
Robin Williams	Lewy Body Dementia (LBD)	Good Morning, Vietnam	Adrian Cronauer	Best Lead Actor	1987	Nominated
Robin Williams	Lewy Body Dementia (LBD)	Dead Poets Society	John Keating	Best Lead Actor	1989	Nominated
Robin Williams	Lewy Body Dementia (LBD)	The Fisher King	Henry "Parry" Sagan	Best Lead Actor	1991	Nominated
Robin Williams	Lewy Body Dementia (LBD)	Good Will Hunting	Dr. Sean Maguire	Best Supporting Actor	1997	Won
Oprah Winfrey	GAD	The Color Purple	Sofia Johnson	Best Supporting Actress	1985	Nominated
Natalie Wood	Alcoholism	Rebel Without a Cause	Judy	Best Supporting Actress	1955	Nominated
Natalie Wood	Alcoholism	Splendor in the Grass	Wilma Dean "Deanie" Loomis	Best Lead Actress	1961	Nominated
Natalie Wood	Alcoholism	Love with the Proper Stranger	Angie Rossini	Best Lead Actress	1963	Nominated
Catherine Zeta-Jones	BD	Chicago	Velma Kelly	Best Supporting Actress	2002	Won

== Nominees who've had cancer/tumors ==
Cancer	Actor	Film	Character	Category	Year	Status
Acoustic Neuroma (AN)	Mark Ruffalo	The Kids Are All Right	Paul Hatfield	Best Supporting Actor	2010	Nominated
Acoustic Neuroma (AN)	Mark Ruffalo	Foxcatcher	Dave Schultz	Best Supporting Actor	2014	Nominated
Acoustic Neuroma (AN)	Mark Ruffalo	Spotlight	Michael Rezendes	Best Supporting Actor	2015	Nominated
Acoustic Neuroma (AN)	Mark Ruffalo	Poor Things	Duncan Wedderburn	Best Supporting Actor	2023	Nominated
Acute Lymphoblastic Leukemia (ALL)	Cornel Wilde	A Song to Remember	Frédéric Chopin	Best Lead Actor	1945	Nominated
Acute Myeloid Leukemia (AML)	Paul Scofield	A Man for All Seasons	Sir Thomas More	Best Lead Actor	1966	Won
Acute Myeloid Leukemia (AML)	Paul Scofield	Quiz Show	Mark Van Doren	Best Supporting Actor	1994	Nominated
Acute Myeloid Leukemia (AML)	Ken Watanabe	The Last Samurai	Lord Moritsugu Katsumoto	Best Supporting Actor	2003	Nominated
Acute Promyelocytic Leukemia (APL)	Robert Vaughn	The Young Philadelphians	Chester A. "Chet" Gwynn	Best Supporting Actor	1959	Nominated
Anal	Spring Byington	You Can't Take It with You	Penelope "Penny" Sycamore	Best Supporting Actress	1938	Nominated
Appendix	Audrey Hepburn	Roman Holiday	Princess Ann (a.k.a. Anya "Smitty" Smith)	Best Lead Actress	1953	Won
Appendix	Audrey Hepburn	Sabrina	Sabrina Fairchild	Best Lead Actress	1954	Nominated
Appendix	Audrey Hepburn	The Nun's Story	Sister Luke a.k.a. Gabrielle van der Mal	Best Lead Actress	1959	Nominated
Appendix	Audrey Hepburn	Breakfast at Tiffany's	Holiday "Holly" Golightly	Best Lead Actress	1961	Nominated
Appendix	Audrey Hepburn	Wait Until Dark	Susy Hendrix	Best Lead Actress	1967	Nominated
Astrocytoma	Robert Donat	The Citadel	Dr. Andrew Manson	Best Lead Actor	1938	Nominated
Astrocytoma	Robert Donat	Goodbye, Mr. Chips	Mr. Charles Edward Chipping	Best Lead Actor	1939	Won
Basal-Cell Carcinoma (BCC)	Melanie Griffith	Working Girl	Tess McGill	Best Lead Actress	1988	Nominated
Basal-Cell Carcinoma (BCC)	Hugh Jackman	Les Misérables	Jean Valjean	Best Lead Actor	2012	Nominated
Basal-Cell Carcinoma (BCC)	William H. Macy	Fargo	Jerome "Jerry" Lundegaard	Best Supporting Actor	1996	Nominated
Bladder	Eileen Brennan	Private Benjamin	Capt. Doreen Lewis	Best Supporting Actress	1980	Nominated
Bladder	Jack Lemmon	Mister Roberts	Ensign Frank Thurlowe Pulver	Best Supporting Actor	1955	Won
Bladder	Jack Lemmon	Some Like It Hot	Jerry (a.k.a. Daphne)	Best Lead Actor	1959	Nominated
Bladder	Jack Lemmon	The Apartment	Calvin Clifford (C.C.) "Buddy Boy" Baxter	Best Lead Actor	1960	Nominated
Bladder	Jack Lemmon	Days of Wine and Roses	Joe Clay	Best Lead Actor	1962	Nominated
Bladder	Jack Lemmon	Save the Tiger	Harry Stoner	Best Lead Actor	1973	Won
Bladder	Jack Lemmon	The China Syndrome	Jack Gödel	Best Lead Actor	1979	Nominated
Bladder	Jack Lemmon	Tribute	Scottie Templeton	Best Lead Actor	1980	Nominated
Bladder	Jack Lemmon	Missing.	Edmund Horman	Best Lead Actor	1982	Nominated
Bladder	Lotte Lenya	The Roman Spring of Mrs. Stone	Contessa Magda Terribili-Gonzales	Best Supporting Actress	1961	Nominated
Bladder	Alfred Lunt	The Guardsman	The Actor	Best Lead Actor	1931/ 1932	Nominated
Bladder	Telly Savalas	Birdman of Alcatraz	Feto Gomez	Best Supporting Actor	1962	Nominated
Bladder	Frank Sinatra	From Here to Eternity	Angelo Maggio	Best Supporting Actor	1953	Won
Bladder	Frank Sinatra	The Man with the Golden Arm	Frankie Machine	Best Lead Actor	1955	Nominated
Breast	Marie-Christine Barrault	Cousin, Cousine	Marthe	Best Lead Actress	1976	Nominated
Breast	Adriana Barraza	Babel	Amelia Hernández	Best Supporting Actress	2006	Nominated
Breast	Ingrid Bergman	For Whom the Bell Tolls	Maria	Best Lead Actress	1943	Nominated
Breast	Ingrid Bergman	Gaslight	Paula Alquist-Anton	Best Lead Actress	1944	Won
Breast	Ingrid Bergman	The Bells of St. Mary's	Sister Mary Benedict	Best Lead Actress	1945	Nominated
Breast	Ingrid Bergman	Joan of Arc	Joan of Arc	Best Lead Actress	1948	Nominated
Breast	Ingrid Bergman	Anastasia	Anna Koreff / Grand Duchess Anastasia	Best Lead Actress	1956	Won
Breast	Ingrid Bergman	Murder on the Orient Express	Greta Ohlsson	Best Supporting Actress	1974	Won
Breast	Ingrid Bergman	Autumn Sonata	Charlotte Andergast	Best Lead Actress	1978	Nominated
Breast	Diahann Carroll	Claudine	Claudine Price	Best Lead Actress	1974	Nominated
Breast	Diane Cilento	Tom Jones	Molly Seagrim	Best Supporting Actress	1963	Nominated
Breast	Bette Davis	Of Human Bondage	Mildred Rogers	Best Lead Actress	1934"	Nominated
Breast	Bette Davis	Dangerous	Joyce Heath	Best Lead Actress	1935	Won
Breast	Bette Davis	Jezebel	Julie Marsden	Best Lead Actress	1938	Won
Breast	Bette Davis	Dark Victory	Judith Traherne	Best Lead Actress	1939	Nominated
Breast	Bette Davis	The Letter	Leslie Crosbie	Best Lead Actress	1940	Nominated
Breast	Bette Davis	The Little Foxes	Regina Giddens	Best Lead Actress	1941	Nominated
Breast	Bette Davis	Now, Voyager	Charlotte Vale	Best Lead Actress	1942	Nominated
Breast	Bette Davis	Mr. Skeffington	Fanny Trellis	Best Lead Actress	1944	Nominated
Breast	Bette Davis	All About Eve	Margo Channing	Best Lead Actress	1950	Nominated
Breast	Bette Davis	The Star	Margaret Elliot	Best Lead Actress	1952	Nominated
Breast	Bette Davis	What Ever Happened to Baby Jane?	Baby Jane Hudson	Best Lead Actress	1962	Nominated
Breast	Ruby Dee	American Gangster	Mahalee Lucas	Best Supporting Actress	2007	Nominated
Breast	Greta Garbo	Anna Christie	Anna Christie	Best Lead Actress	1930	Nominated
Breast	Greta Garbo	Romance	Madame Rita Cavallini	Best Lead Actress	1930	Nominated
Breast	Greta Garbo	Camille	Marguerite Gautier	Best Lead Actress	1937	Nominated
Breast	Greta Garbo	Ninotchka	Nina Ivanova "Ninotchka" Yakushova	Best Lead Actress	1939	Nominated
Breast	Paulette Goddard	So Proudly We Hail!	Lieut. Joan O'Doul	Best Supporting Actress	1943	Nominated
Breast	Judy Holliday	Born Yesterday	Billie Dawn	Best Lead Actress	1950	Won
Breast	Hattie McDaniel	Gone with the Wind	Mammy	Best Supporting Actress	1939	Won
Breast	Lynn Redgrave	Georgy Girl	Georgina "Georgy" Parkin	Best Lead Actress	1966	Nominated
Breast	Lynn Redgrave	Gods and Monsters	Hanna	Best Supporting Actress	1998	Nominated
Breast	Rosalind Russell	My Sister Eileen	Ruth Sherwood	Best Lead Actress	1942	Nominated
Breast	Rosalind Russell	Sister Kenny	Sister Elizabeth Kenny	Best Lead Actress	1946	Nominated
Breast	Rosalind Russell	Mourning Becomes Electra	Lavinia Mannon	Best Lead Actress	1947	Nominated
Breast	Rosalind Russell	Auntie Mame	Aunt Mame Dennis	Best Lead Actress	1958	Nominated
Cervical	Anjelica Huston	Prizzi's Honor	MaeRose Prizzi	Best Supporting Actress	1985	Won
Cervical	Anjelica Huston	Enemies: A Love Story	Tamara Broder	Best Supporting Actress	1989	Nominated
Cervical	Anjelica Huston	The Grifters	Lilly Dillon	Best Lead Actress	1990	Nominated
Cervical	Kay Medford	Funny Girl	Rose Brice	Best Supporting Actress	1968	Nominated
Chondrosarcoma	Sondra Locke	The Heart Is a Lonely Hunter	Margaret "Mick" Kelly	Best Supporting Actress	1968	Nominated
Chronic Lymphocytic Leukemia (CLL)	Samantha Eggar	The Collector	Miranda Grey	Best Lead Actress	1965	Nominated
Chronic Lymphocytic Leukemia (CLL)	Jill Clayburgh	An Unmarried Woman	Erica Benton	Best Lead Actress	1978	Nominated
Chronic Lymphocytic Leukemia (CLL)	Jill Clayburgh	Starting Over	Marilyn Holmberg	Best Lead Actress	1979	Nominated
Chronic Myelogenous Leukemia (CML)	John Ireland	All the King's Men	Jack Burden	Best Supporting Actor	1949	Nominated
Chronic Myelogenous Leukemia (CML)	Ryan O’Neal	Love Story	Oliver Barrett IV	Best Lead Actor	1970	Nominated
Colorectal	Jack Albertson	The Subject Was Roses	John Cleary	Best Supporting Actor	1968	Won
Colorectal	Eve Arden	Mildred Pierce	Ida Corwin	Best Supporting Actress	1945	Nominated
Colorectal	Barbara Barrie	Breaking Away	Evelyn Stohler	Best Supporting Actress	1979	Nominated
Colorectal	Chadwick Boseman	Ma Rainey's Black Bottom	Levee Green	Best Lead Actor	2020/ 2021	Nominated
Colorectal	Gary Cooper	Mr. Deeds Goes to Town	Longfellow Deeds	Best Lead Actor	1936	Nominated
Colorectal	Gary Cooper	Sergeant York	Sgt. Alvin York	Best Lead Actor	1941	Won
Colorectal	Gary Cooper	The Pride of the Yankees	Lou Gehrig	Best Lead Actor	1942	Nominated
Colorectal	Gary Cooper	For Whom the Bell Tolls	Robert Jordan	Best Lead Actor	1943	Nominated
Colorectal	Gary Cooper	High Noon	Marshal Will Kane	Best Lead Actor	1952	Won
Colorectal	José Ferrer	Joan of Arc	Dauphin King Charles VII	Best Supporting Actor	1948	Nominated
Colorectal	José Ferrer	Cyrano de Bergerac	Cyrano de Bergerac	Best Lead Actor	1950	Won
Colorectal	José Ferrer	Moulin Rouge	Henri de Toulouse-Lautrec / Count Alphonse de Toulouse-Lautrec Montfa	Best Lead Actor	1952	Nominated
Colorectal	Morgan Freeman	Street Smart	Leo "Fast Black" Smalls Jr.	Best Supporting Actor	1987	Nominated
Colorectal	Morgan Freeman	Driving Miss Daisy	Hoke Colburn	Best Lead Actor	1989	Nominated
Colorectal	Morgan Freeman	The Shawshank Redemption	Ellis Boyd "Red" Redding / Narrator	Best Lead Actor	1994	Nominated
Colorectal	Morgan Freeman	Million Dollar Baby	Eddie "Scrap-Iron" Dupris	Best Supporting Actor	2004	Won
Colorectal	Morgan Freeman	Invictus	Nelson Mandela	Best Lead Actor	2009	Nominated
Colorectal	Jackie Gleason	The Hustler	Minnesota Fats	Best Supporting Actor	1961	Nominated
Colorectal	Carolyn Jones	The Bachelor Party	The Existentialist	Best Supporting Actress	1957	Nominated
Colorectal	Walter Matthau	The Fortune Cookie	William H. "Whiplash Willie" Gingrich	Best Supporting Actor	1966	Won
Colorectal	Walter Matthau	Kotch	Joseph P. Kotcher	Best Lead Actor	1971	Nominated
Colorectal	Walter Matthau	The Sunshine Boys	Willy Clark	Best Lead Actor	1975	Nominated
Colorectal	Robert Montgomery	Night Must Fall	Danny	Best Lead Actor	1937	Nominated
Colorectal	Robert Montgomery	Here Comes Mr. Jordan	Joe Pendleton	Best Lead Actor	1941	Nominated
Colorectal	Julie Walters	Educating Rita	Susan "Rita" White	Best Lead Actress	1983	Nominated
Colorectal	Julie Walters	Billy Elliot	Mrs. Sandra Wilkinson	Best Supporting Actress	2000	Nominated
Endometrial	Edna May Oliver	Drums Along the Mohawk	Mrs. Sarah McKlennar	Best Supporting Actress	1939	Nominated
Ependymoma	Flora Robson	Saratoga Trunk	Angelique Buiton	Best Supporting Actress	1946	Nominated
Essential Thrombocythemia	Susan Tyrrell	Fat City	Oma Lee Greer	Best Supporting Actress	1972	Nominated
Esophageal	Humphrey Bogart	Casablanca	Rick Blaine	Best Lead Actor	1943	Nominated
Esophageal	Humphrey Bogart	The African Queen	Charlie Allnut	Best Lead Actor	1951	Won
Esophageal	Humphrey Bogart	The Caine Mutiny	LCDR Philip Francis Queeg	Best Lead Actor	1954	Nominated
Esophageal	Gladys George	Valiant Is the Word for Carrie	Carrie Snyder	Best Lead Actress	1936	Nominated
Esophageal	Jean Hagen	Singin' in the Rain	Lina Lamont	Best Supporting Actress	1952	Nominated
Esophageal	Mako	The Sand Pebbles	Po-Han	Best Supporting Actor	1966	Nominated
Esophageal	Anne Ramsey	Throw Momma from the Train	Mrs. "Momma" Lift	Best Supporting Actress	1987	Nominated
Esophageal	Sylvia Sidney	Summer Wishes, Winter Dreams	Mrs. Wanda Pritchett	Best Supporting Actress	1973	Nominated
Esophageal	May Whitty	Night Must Fall	Mrs. Bramson	Best Supporting Actress	1937	Nominated
Esophageal	May Whitty	Mrs. Miniver	Lady Beldon	Best Supporting Actress	1942	Nominated
Esophageal	Ed Wynn	The Diary of Anne Frank	Albert Düssel	Best Supporting Actor	1959	Won
Fallopian Tube	Alice Brady	My Man Godfrey	Angelica Bullock	Best Supporting Actress	1937	Nominated
Fallopian Tube	Alice Brady	In Old Chicago	Molly O'Leary	Best Supporting Actress	1937	Won
Follicular Lymphoma (FL)	Robert Ryan	Crossfire	Sgt. "Monty" Montgomery	Best Supporting Actor	1947	Nominated
Gallbladder	Rod Steiger	On the Waterfront	Charlie Malloy	Best Supporting Actor	1954	Nominated
Gallbladder	Rod Steiger	The Pawnbroker	Sol Nazerman	Best Lead Actor	1965	Nominated
Gallbladder	Rod Steiger	In the Heat of the Night	Chief Bill Gillespie	Best Lead Actor	1967	Won
Germ Cell	Mildred Natwick	Barefoot in the Park	Ethel Banks	Best Supporting Actress	1967	Nominated
Glioblastoma	Robert Forster	Jackie Brown	Max Cherry	Best Supporting Actor	1997	Nominated
Glioblastoma	Susan Hayward	Smash-Up: The Story of a Woman	Angelica "Angie/Angel" Evans-Conway	Best Lead Actress	1947	Nominated
Glioblastoma	Susan Hayward	My Foolish Heart	Eloise Winters	Best Lead Actress	1949	Nominated
Glioblastoma	Susan Hayward	With a Song in My Heart	Jane Froman	Best Lead Actress	1952	Nominated
Glioblastoma	Susan Hayward	I'll Cry Tomorrow	Lillian Roth	Best Lead Actress	1955	Nominated
Glioblastoma	Susan Hayward	I Want to Live!	Barbara Graham	Best Lead Actress	1958	Won
Hodgkin Lymphoma (HL)	Richard Harris	This Sporting Life	Frank Machin	Best Lead Actor	1963	Nominated
Hodgkin Lymphoma (HL)	Richard Harris	The Field	"Bull" McCabe	Best Lead Actor	1990	Nominated
Hodgkin Lymphoma (HL)	Daniel Massey	Star!	Noël Coward	Best Supporting Actor	1968	Nominated
Hypopharyngeal	Richard Barthelmess	The Noose	Nickie Elkins	Best Lead Actor	1927/ 1928	Nominated
Hypopharyngeal	Richard Barthelmess	The Patent Leather Kid	The Patent Leather Kid	Best Lead Actor	1927/ 1928	Nominated
Hypopharyngeal	Brian Donlevy	Beau Geste	Sgt. Markoff	Best Supporting Actor	1939	Nominated
Kidney	Albert Finney	Tom Jones	Tom Jones	Best Lead Actor	1963	Nominated
Kidney	Albert Finney	Murder on the Orient Express	Det. Hercule Poirot	Best Lead Actor	1974	Nominated
Kidney	Albert Finney	The Dresser	Sir	Best Lead Actor	1983	Nominated
Kidney	Albert Finney	Under the Volcano	Geoffrey Firmin	Best Lead Actor	1984	Nominated
Kidney	Albert Finney	Erin Brokovich	Edward L. Masry	Best Supporting Actor	2000	Nominated
Kidney	Charles Laughton	The Private Life of Henry VIII	King Henry VIII	Best Lead Actor	1932/ 1933	Won
Kidney	Charles Laughton	Mutiny on the Bounty	Capt. William Bligh	Best Lead Actor	1935	Nominated
Kidney	Charles Laughton	Witness for the Prosecution	Sir Wilfrid Robarts	Best Lead Actor	1957	Nominated
Kidney	Lee Remick	Days of Wine and Roses	Kirsten Arnesen-Clay	Best Lead Actress	1962	Nominated
Laryngeal	Dexter Gordon	'Round Midnight	Dale Turner	Best Lead Actor	1986	Nominated
Liver	Marlon Brando	A Streetcar Named Desire	Stanley Kowalski	Best Lead Actor	1951	Nominated
Liver	Marlon Brando	Viva Zapata!	Emiliano Zapata	Best Lead Actor	1952	Nominated
Liver	Marlon Brando	Julius Caesar	Mark Antony	Best Lead Actor	1953	Nominated
Liver	Marlon Brando	On the Waterfront	Terry Malloy	Best Lead Actor	1954	Won
Liver	Marlon Brando	Sayonara	Maj. Lloyd "Ace" Gruver, USAF	Best Lead Actor	1957	Nominated
Liver	Marlon Brando	The Godfather — Part I	Don Vito Corleone	Best Lead Actor	1972	Won
Liver	Marlon Brando	Last Tango in Paris	Paul	Best Lead Actor	1973	Nominated
Liver	Marlon Brando	A Dry White Season	Ian McKenzie	Best Supporting Actor	1989	Nominated
Liver	Alec Guinness	The Lavender Hill Mob	Henry Holland	Best Lead Actor	1952	Nominated
Liver	Alec Guinness	The Bridge on the River Kwai	Lt. Col. Nicholson	Best Lead Actor	1957	Won
Liver	Alec Guinness	Star Wars — Episode IV: A New Hope	Obi-Wan Kenobi	Best Supporting Actor	1977	Nominated
Liver	Alec Guinness	Little Dorrit	William Dorrit	Best Supporting Actor	1988	Nominated
Liver	Emil Jannings	The Last Command	Grand Duke Sergius Alexander	Best Lead Actor	1927/ 1928	Won
Liver	Emil Jannings	The Way of All Flesh	August Schilling	Best Lead Actor	1927/ 1928	Won
Liver	Anthony Quayle	Anne of the Thousand Days	Card. Thomas Wolsey	Best Supporting Actor	1969	Nominated
Liver	Lee Tracy	The Best Man	Pres. Art Hockstader	Best Supporting Actor	1964	Nominated
Lung	Barbara Bel Geddes	I Remember Mama	Katrin Hanson	Best Supporting Actress	1948	Nominated
Lung	Yul Brynner	The King and I	King Mongkut	Best Lead Actor	1956	Won
Lung	Rupert Crosse	The Reivers	Ned McCaslin	Best Supporting Actor	1969	Nominated
Lung	Vittorio De Sica	A Farewell to Arms	Maj. Alessandro Rinaldi	Best Supporting Actor	1957	Nominated
Lung	Bonita Granville	These Three	Mary Tilford	Best Supporting Actress	1936	Nominated
Lung	Grayson Hall	The Night of the Iguana	Judith Fellowes	Best Supporting Actress	1964	Nominated
Lung	Barbara Harris	Who Is Harry Kellerman and Why Is He Saying Those Terrible Things About Me?	Allison Densmore	Best Supporting Actress	1971	Nominated
Lung	Eileen Heckart	The Bad Seed	Hortense Daigle	Best Supporting Actress	1956	Nominated
Lung	Eileen Heckart	Butterflies Are Free	Mrs. Florence Baker	Best Supporting Actress	1972	Won
Lung	Marjorie Main	The Egg and I	Phoebe “Ma” Kettle	Best Supporting Actress	1947	Nominated
Lung	Melina Mercouri	Never on Sunday	Ilya	Best Lead Actress	1960	Nominated
Lung	Ray Milland	The Lost Weekend	Don Birnam	Best Lead Actor	1945	Won
Lung	Robert Mitchum	The Story of G.I. Joe	1st Lt./Capt. Bill Walker	Best Supporting Actor	1945	Nominated
Lung	Patricia Neal	Hud	Alma Brown	Best Lead Actress	1963	Won
Lung	Patricia Neal	The Subject Was Roses	Nettie Cleary	Best Lead Actress	1968	Nominated
Lung	Paul Newman	Cat on a Hot Tin Roof	"Brick" Pollitt	Best Lead Actor	1958	Nominated
Lung	Paul Newman	The Hustler	"Fast Eddie" Felson	Best Lead Actor	1961	Nominated
Lung	Paul Newman	Hud	Hud Bannon	Best Lead Actor	1963	Nominated
Lung	Paul Newman	Cool Hand Luke	Lucas Jackson	Best Lead Actor	1967	Nominated
Lung	Paul Newman	Absence of Malice	Michael Colin Gallagher	Best Lead Actor	1981	Nominated
Lung	Paul Newman	The Verdict	Attny. Frank Galvin	Best Lead Actor	1982	Nominated
Lung	Paul Newman	The Color of Money	"Fast Eddie" Felson	Best Lead Actor	1986	Won
Lung	Paul Newman	Nobody's Fool	Donald J. "Sully" Sullivan	Best Lead Actor	1994	Nominated
Lung	Paul Newman	Road to Perdition	John Rooney	Best Supporting Actor	2002	Nominated
Lung	Robert Preston	Victor/Victoria	Carroll "Toddy" Todd	Best Supporting Actor	1982	Nominated
Lung	Anthony Quinn	Viva Zapata!	Eufemio Zapata	Best Supporting Actor	1952	Won
Lung	Anthony Quinn	Lust for Life	Paul Gauguin	Best Supporting Actor	1956	Won
Lung	Anthony Quinn	Wild Is the Wind	Gino	Best Lead Actor	1957	Nominated
Lung	Anthony Quinn	Zorba the Greek	Alexis Zorba	Best Lead Actor	1964	Nominated
Lung	Jason Robards Jr.	All the President's Men	Ben Bradlee	Best Supporting Actor	1976	Won
Lung	Jason Robards Jr.	Julia	Dashiell Hammett	Best Supporting Actor	1977	Won
Lung	Jason Robards Jr.	Melvin (and Howard)	Howard Hughes	Best Supporting Actor	1980	Nominated
Lung	Anne Shirley	Stella Dallas	Laurel Dallas	Best Supporting Actress	1937	Nominated
Lung	Jean Simmons	Hamlet	Ophelia	Best Supporting Actress	1948	Nominated
Lung	Jean Simmons	The Happy Ending	Mary Spencer-Wilson	Best Lead Actress	1969	Nominated
Lung	Gloria Stuart	Titanic	Rose DeWitt-Bukater	Best Supporting Actress	1997	Nominated
Lung	Franchot Tone	Mutiny on the Bounty	MIDN Roger Byam	Best Lead Actor	1935	Nominated
Lung	James Whitmore	Battleground	Staff Sgt. Kinnie	Best Supporting Actor	1949	Nominated
Lung	James Whitmore	Give 'em Hell, Harry!	Harry S. Truman	Best Lead Actor	1975	Nominated
Mantle Cell Lymphoma (MCL)	Howard E. Rollins Jr.	Ragtime	Coalhouse Walker Jr.	Best Supporting Actor	1981	Nominated
Melanoma	Clint Eastwood	Unforgiven	William Munny	Best Lead Actor	1992	Nominated
Melanoma	Clint Eastwood	Million Dollar Baby	Frankie Dunn	Best Lead Actor	2004	Nominated
Melanoma	Richard Jaeckel	Sometimes a Great Notion	Joe Ben Stamper	Best Supporting Actor	1971	Nominated
Melanoma	Burgess Meredith	The Day of the Locust	Harry Greener	Best Supporting Actor	1975	Nominated
Melanoma	Burgess Meredith	Rocky	Mickey Goldmill	Best Supporting Actor	1976	Nominated
Meningioma	Mary Tyler Moore	Ordinary People	Beth Jarrett	Best Lead Actress	1980	Nominated
Meningioma	Elizabeth Taylor	Raintree County	Susanna Drake	Best Lead Actress	1957	Nominated
Meningioma	Elizabeth Taylor	Cat on a Hot Tin Roof	Margaret "Maggie the Cat" Pollitt	Best Lead Actress	1958	Nominated
Meningioma	Elizabeth Taylor	Suddenly, Last Summer	Catherine Holly	Best Lead Actress	1959	Nominated
Meningioma	Elizabeth Taylor	BUtterfield 8	Gloria Wandrous	Best Lead Actress	1960	Won
Meningioma	Elizabeth Taylor	Who's Afraid of Virginia Woolf?	Martha	Best Lead Actress	1966	Won
Mesothelioma	Steve McQueen	The Sand Pebbles	MM Jake Holman	Best Lead Actor	1966	Nominated
Multiple Myeloma (MM)	Roy Scheider	The French Connection	Buddy Russo	Best Supporting Actor	1971	Nominated
Multiple Myeloma (MM)	Roy Scheider	All That Jazz	Joe Gideon	Best Lead Actor	1979	Nominated
Multiple Myeloma (MM)	Susannah York	They Shoot Horses, Don't They?	Alice LeBlanc	Best Supporting Actress	1969	Nominated
Myelodysplastic Syndrome (MDS)	Nina Foch	Executive Suite	Erica Martin	Best Supporting Actress	1954	Nominated
Myeloproliferative Neoplasms (MPN)	Joan Blondell	The Blue Veil	Annie Rawlins	Best Supporting Actress	1951	Nominated
Nasopharyngeal	Gary Busey	The Buddy Holly Story	Buddy Holly	Best Lead Actor	1978	Nominated
Nodules	Julie Andrews	Mary Poppins	Mary Poppins	Best Lead Actress	1964	Won
Nodules	Julie Andrews	The Sound of Music	Maria Von Trapp	Best Lead Actress	1965	Nominated
Nodules	Julie Andrews	Victor/Victoria	Victoria Grant a.k.a. Count Victor Grazinski	Best Lead Actress	1982	Nominated
Non-Hodgkin Lymphoma (NHL)	Jeff Bridges	The Last Picture Show	Duane Jackson	Best Supporting Actor	1971	Nominated
Non-Hodgkin Lymphoma (NHL)	Jeff Bridges	Thunderbolt and Lightfoot	"Lightfoot"	Best Supporting Actor	1974	Nominated
Non-Hodgkin Lymphoma (NHL)	Jeff Bridges	Starman	"Starman" / Scott Hayden	Best Lead Actor	1984	Nominated
Non-Hodgkin Lymphoma (NHL)	Jeff Bridges	The Contender	Pres. Jackson Evans	Best Supporting Actor	2000	Nominated
Non-Hodgkin Lymphoma (NHL)	Jeff Bridges	Crazy Heart	Otis "Bad" Blake	Best Lead Actor	2009	Won
Non-Hodgkin Lymphoma (NHL)	Jeff Bridges	True Grit	Reuben J. "Rooster" Cogburn	Best Lead Actor	2010	Nominated
Non-Hodgkin Lymphoma (NHL)	Jeff Bridges	Hell or High Water	TXR Marcus Hamilton	Best Supporting Actor	2016	Nominated
Non-Hodgkin Lymphoma (NHL)	Jane Fonda	They Shoot Horses, Don't They?	Gloria Beatty	Best Lead Actress	1969	Nominated
Non-Hodgkin Lymphoma (NHL)	Jane Fonda	Klute	Bree Daniels	Best Lead Actress	1971	Won
Non-Hodgkin Lymphoma (NHL)	Jane Fonda	Julia	Lillian Hellman	Best Lead Actress	1977	Nominated
Non-Hodgkin Lymphoma (NHL)	Jane Fonda	Coming Home	Sally Bender-Hyde	Best Lead Actress	1978	Won
Non-Hodgkin Lymphoma (NHL)	Jane Fonda	The China Syndrome	Kimberly Wells	Best Lead Actress	1979	Nominated
Non-Hodgkin Lymphoma (NHL)	Jane Fonda	On Golden Pond	Chelsea Thayer-Wayne	Best Supporting Actress	1981	Nominated
Non-Hodgkin Lymphoma (NHL)	Jane Fonda	The Morning After	Alexandra Sternbergen (a.k.a. Viveca Van Loren)	Best Lead Actress	1986	Nominated
Non-Hodgkin Lymphoma (NHL)	Gene Wilder	The Producers	Leopold Bloom	Best Supporting Actor	1968	Nominated
Oligodendroglioma	Miyoshi Umeki	Sayonara	Katsumi Kelly	Best Supporting Actress	1957	Won
Oral	Arthur Hunnicutt	The Big Sky	Zeb Calloway (Narrator)	Best Supporting Actor	1952	Nominated
Oral	Burl Ives	The Big Country	Rufus Hannassey	Best Supporting Actor	1958	Won
Oral	Jack Wild	Oliver!	The Artful Dodger (a.k.a. Jack Dawkins)	Best Supporting Actor	1968	Nominated
Oropharyngeal	Dustin Hoffman	The Graduate	Benjamin Braddock	Best Lead Actor	1967	Nominated
Oropharyngeal	Dustin Hoffman	Midnight Cowboy	Enrico Salvatore "Ratso" Rizzo	Best Lead Actor	1969	Nominated
Oropharyngeal	Dustin Hoffman	Lenny	Lenny Bruce	Best Lead Actor	1974	Nominated
Oropharyngeal	Dustin Hoffman	Kramer vs. Kramer	Ted Kramer	Best Lead Actor	1979	Won
Oropharyngeal	Dustin Hoffman	Tootsie	Michael Dorsey a.k.a. Dorothy Michaels	Best Lead Actor	1982	Nominated
Oropharyngeal	Dustin Hoffman	Rain Man	Raymond Babbitt	Best Lead Actor	1988	Won
Oropharyngeal	Dustin Hoffman	Wag the Dog	Stanley Motss	Best Lead Actor	1997	Nominated
Oropharyngeal	Stanley Tucci	The Lovely Bones	George Harvey	Best Supporting Actor	2009	Nominated
Oropharyngeal	Lana Turner	Peyton Place	Constance MacKenzie	Best Lead Actress	1957	Nominated
Osteosarcoma	Alexander Knox	Wilson	Pres. Woodrow Wilson	Best Lead Actor	1944	Nominated
Ovarian	Kathy Bates	Misery	Annie Wilkes	Best Lead Actress	1990	Won
Ovarian	Kathy Bates	Primary Colors	Libby Holden	Best Supporting Actress	1998	Nominated
Ovarian	Kathy Bates	About Schmidt	Roberta Hertzel	Best Supporting Actress	2002	Nominated
Ovarian	Kathy Bates	Richard Jewell	Bobi Jewell	Best Supporting Actress	2019	Nominated
Ovarian	Elisabeth Bergner	Escape Me Never	Gemma Jones	Best Lead Actress	1935	Nominated
Ovarian	Carol Channing	Thoroughly Modern Millie	Muzzy Van Hossmere	Best Supporting Actress	1967	Nominated
Ovarian	Sandy Dennis	Who's Afraid of Virginia Woolf?	Honey	Best Supporting Actress	1966	Won
Ovarian	Joan Hackett	Only When I Laugh	Toby Landau	Best Supporting Actress	1981	Nominated
Ovarian	Madeline Kahn	Paper Moon	Trixie Delight	Best Supporting Actress	1973	Nominated
Ovarian	Madeline Kahn	Blazing Saddles	Lili Von Shtupp	Best Supporting Actress	1974	Nominated
Ovarian	Jessica Tandy	Driving Miss Daisy	Ms. Daisy Werthan	Best Lead Actress	1989	Won
Ovarian	Jessica Tandy	Fried Green Tomatoes	Ninny Threadgoode	Best Supporting Actress	1991	Nominated
Ovarian	Loretta Young	The Farmer's Daughter	Katrin "Katy" Holstrom	Best Lead Actress	1947	Won
Ovarian	Loretta Young	Come to the Stable	Sister Margaret	Best Lead Actress	1949	Nominated
Pancreatic	Alan Bates	The Fixer	Yakov Shepsovitch-Bok	Best Lead Actor	1968	Nominated
Pancreatic	Joan Crawford	Mildred Pierce	Mildred Pierce	Best Lead Actress	1945	Won
Pancreatic	Joan Crawford	Possessed	Louise Howell	Best Lead Actress	1947	Nominated
Pancreatic	Joan Crawford	Sudden Fear!	Myra Hudson	Best Lead Actress	1952	Nominated
Pancreatic	Rex Harrison	Cleopatra	Julius Caesar	Best Lead Actor	1963	Nominated
Pancreatic	Rex Harrison	My Fair Lady	Prof. Henry Higgins	Best Lead Actor	1964	Won
Pancreatic	Nigel Hawthorne	The Madness of King George	King George III	Best Lead Actor	1994	Nominated
Pancreatic	John Hurt	Midnight Express	Max	Best Supporting Actor	1978	Nominated
Pancreatic	John Hurt	The Elephant Man	John Merrick	Best Lead Actor	1980	Nominated
Pancreatic	Anna Magnani	The Rose Tattoo	Serafina Delle Rose	Best Lead Actress	1955	Won
Pancreatic	Anna Magnani	Wild Is the Wind	Gioia	Best Lead Actress	1957	Nominated
Pancreatic	Marcello Mastroianni	Divorce Italian Style	Ferdinando "Fefè" Cefalù	Best Lead Actor	1962	Nominated
Pancreatic	Marcello Mastroianni	A Special Day	Gabriele	Best Lead Actor	1977	Nominated
Pancreatic	Marcello Mastroianni	Dark Eyes	Romano Patroni	Best Lead Actor	1987	Nominated
Pancreatic	Donna Reed	From Here to Eternity	Alma Burke a.k.a. Lurene	Best Supporting Actress	1953	Won
Pancreatic	Simone Signoret	Room at the Top	Alice Aisgill	Best Lead Actress	1959	Won
Pancreatic	Simone Signoret	Ship of Fools	La Condesa	Best Lead Actress	1965	Nominated
Penile	Chill Wills	The Alamo	"Beekeeper"	Best Supporting Actor	1960	Nominated
Periampullary	Karen Black	Five Easy Pieces	Rayette DiPesto	Best Supporting Actress	1970	Nominated
Peritoneal Mesothelioma (PM)	Thomas Mitchell	The Hurricane	Dr. Kersaint	Best Supporting Actor	1937	Nominated
Peritoneal Mesothelioma (PM)	Thomas Mitchell	Stagecoach	Dr. Josiah "Doc" Boone	Best Supporting Actor	1939	Won
Prostate	Don Ameche	Cocoon	Art Selwyn	Best Supporting Actor	1985	Won
Prostate	Hume Cronyn	The Seventh Cross	Paul Roeder	Best Supporting Actor	1944	Nominated
Prostate	Robert De Niro	The Godfather Part II	Vito Corleone	Best Supporting Actor	1974	Won
Prostate	Robert De Niro	Taxi Driver	Travis Bickle	Best Lead Actor	1976	Nominated
Prostate	Robert De Niro	The Deer Hunter	Mike Vronsky	Best Lead Actor	1978	Nominated
Prostate	Robert De Niro	Raging Bull	Jake LaMotta	Best Lead Actor	1980	Won
Prostate	Robert De Niro	Awakenings	Leonard Lowe	Best Lead Actor	1990	Nominated
Prostate	Robert De Niro	Cape Fear	Max Cady	Best Lead Actor	1991	Nominated
Prostate	Robert De Niro	Silver Linings Playbook	Patrizio Solitano Sr.	Best Supporting Actor	2012	Nominated
Prostate	Robert De Niro	Killers of the Flower Moon	William King Hale	Best Supporting Actor	2023	Nominated
Prostate	William Demarest	The Jolson Story	Steve Martin	Best Supporting Actor	1946	Nominated
Prostate	Richard Farnsworth	Comes a Horseman	Dodger	Best Supporting Actor	1978	Nominated
Prostate	Richard Farnsworth	The Straight Story	Alvin Straight	Best Lead Actor	1999	Nominated
Prostate	Henry Fonda	The Grapes of Wrath	Tom Joad	Best Lead Actor	1940	Nominated
Prostate	Henry Fonda	On Golden Pond	Norman Thayer Jr.	Best Lead Actor	1981	Won
Prostate	Louis Gossett Jr.	An Officer and a Gentleman	GySgt. Emil Foley	Best Supporting Actor	1982	Won
Prostate	Charlton Heston	Ben-Hur	Judah Ben-Hur	Best Lead Actor	1959	Won
Prostate	Dennis Hopper	Hoosiers	Wilbur "Shooter" Flatch	Best Supporting Actor	1986	Nominated
Prostate	William Hurt	Kiss of the Spider Woman	Luis Molina	Best Lead Actor	1985	Won
Prostate	William Hurt	Children of a Lesser God	James Leeds	Best Lead Actor	1986	Nominated
Prostate	William Hurt	Broadcast News	Tom Grunick	Best Lead Actor	1987	Nominated
Prostate	William Hurt	A History of Violence	Richie Cusack	Best Supporting Actor	2005	Nominated
Prostate	Sam Jaffe	The Asphalt Jungle	Dr. Erwin "Doc" Riedenschneider	Best Supporting Actor	1950	Nominated
Prostate	Fredric March	The Royal Family of Broadway	Tony Cavendish	Best Lead Actor	1930/ 1931	Nominated
Prostate	Fredric March	Dr. Jekyll and Mr. Hyde	Dr. Henry Jekyll / Mr. Edward Hyde	Best Lead Actor	1931/ 1932	Won
Prostate	Fredric March	A Star Is Born	Norman Maine	Best Lead Actor	1937	Nominated
Prostate	Fredric March	The Best Years of Our Lives	Sgt. Al Stephenson	Best Lead Actor	1946	Won
Prostate	Fredric March	Death of a Salesman	Willy Loman	Best Lead Actor	1951	Nominated
Prostate	Ian McKellen	Gods and Monsters	James Whale	Best Lead Actor	1998	Nominated
Prostate	Ian McKellen	The Lord of the Rings: The Fellowship of the Ring	Gandalf	Best Supporting Actor	2001	Nominated
Prostate	Laurence Olivier	Wuthering Heights	Heathcliff	Best Lead Actor	1939	Nominated
Prostate	Laurence Olivier	Rebecca	George Fortescue Maximilian “Maxim” de Winter	Best Lead Actor	1940	Nominated
Prostate	Laurence Olivier	Henry V	King Henry V	Best Lead Actor	1946	Nominated
Prostate	Laurence Olivier	Hamlet	Prince Hamlet	Best Lead Actor	1948	Won
Prostate	Laurence Olivier	Richard III	King Richard III	Best Lead Actor	1955	Nominated
Prostate	Laurence Olivier	The Entertainer	Archie Rice	Best Lead Actor	1960	Nominated
Prostate	Laurence Olivier	Othello	Othello	Best Lead Actor	1965	Nominated
Prostate	Laurence Olivier	Sleuth	Andrew Wyke	Best Lead Actor	1972	Nominated
Prostate	Laurence Olivier	Marathon Man	Dr. Christian Szell a.k.a. "The White Angel"	Best Supporting Actor	1976	Nominated
Prostate	Laurence Olivier	The Boys from Brazil	Ezra Lieberman	Best Lead Actor	1978	Nominated
Prostate	Sidney Poitier	The Defiant Ones	Noah Cullen	Best Lead Actor	1958	Nominated
Prostate	Sidney Poitier	Lilies of the Field	Homer Smith	Best Lead Actor	1963	Won
Prostate	Robert Stack	Written on the Wind	Kyle Hadley	Best Supporting Actor	1956	Nominated
Prostate	Erich Von Stroheim	Sunset Boulevard	Max Von Meyerling	Best Supporting Actor	1950	Nominated
Small Intestine	Akim Tamiroff	The General Died at Dawn	General Yang	Best Supporting Actor	1936	Nominated
Small Intestine	Akim Tamiroff	For Whom the Bell Tolls	Pablo	Best Supporting Actor	1943	Nominated
Spinal	John Houseman	The Paper Chase	Charles W. Kingfield Jr.	Best Supporting Actor	1973	Won
Splenic	Katina Paxinou	For Whom the Bell Tolls	Pilar	Best Supporting Actress	1943	Won
Squamous-Cell Carcinoma (SCC)	Diane Keaton	Annie Hall	Annie Hall	Best Lead Actress	1977	Won
Squamous-Cell Carcinoma (SCC)	Diane Keaton	Reds	Louise Bryant	Best Lead Actress	1981	Nominated
Squamous-Cell Carcinoma (SCC)	Diane Keaton	Marvin's Room	Bessie Wakefield	Best Lead Actress	1996	Nominated
Squamous-Cell Carcinoma (SCC)	Diane Keaton	Something's Gotta Give	Erica Barry	Best Lead Actress	2003	Nominated
Squamous-Cell Carcinoma (SCC)	Stuart Whitman	The Mark	Jim Fuller	Best Lead Actor	1961	Nominated
Stomach	Gloria Grahame	Crossfire	Ginny Tremaine	Best Supporting Actress	1947	Nominated
Stomach	Gloria Grahame	The Bad and the Beautiful	Rosemary Bartlow	Best Supporting Actress	1952	Won
Stomach	Jack Gilford	Save the Tiger	Phil Greene	Best Supporting Actress	1973	Nominated
Stomach	Laurence Harvey	Room at the Top	Joe Lampton	Best Lead Actor	1959	Nominated
Stomach	Chester Morris	Alibi	Chick Williams	Best Lead Actor	1928/ 1929	Nominated
Stomach	Peter O'Toole	Lawrence of Arabia	T.E. Lawrence	Best Lead Actor	1962	Nominated
Stomach	Peter O'Toole	Becket	King Henry II	Best Lead Actor	1964	Nominated
Stomach	Peter O'Toole	The Lion in Winter	King Henry II	Best Lead Actor	1968	Nominated
Stomach	Peter O'Toole	Goodbye, Mr. Chips	Mr. Arthur Chipping	Best Lead Actor	1969	Nominated
Stomach	Peter O'Toole	The Ruling Class	Earl Jack Gurney, 14th	Best Lead Actor	1972	Nominated
Stomach	Peter O'Toole	The Stunt Man	Eli Cross	Best Lead Actor	1980	Nominated
Stomach	Peter O'Toole	My Favorite Year	Alan Swann	Best Lead Actor	1982	Nominated
Stomach	Peter O'Toole	Venus	Maurice Russell	Best Lead Actor	2006	Nominated
Stomach	John Wayne	Sands of Iwo Jima	Sgt. John M. Stryker	Best Lead Actor	1949	Nominated
Stomach	John Wayne	True Grit	Reuben J. "Rooster" Cogburn	Best Lead Actor	1969	Won
Testicular	Pete Postlethwaite	In the Name of the Father	Patrick "Giuseppe" Conlon	Best Supporting Actor	1993	Nominated
Thyroid	Arthur Kennedy	Champion	Connie Kelly	Best Supporting Actor	1949	Nominated
Thyroid	Arthur Kennedy	Bright Victory	Sgt. Larry Nevins	Best Lead Actor	1951	Nominated
Thyroid	Arthur Kennedy	Trial	Bernard "Barney" Castle	Best Supporting Actor	1955	Nominated
Thyroid	Arthur Kennedy	Peyton Place	Lucas Cross	Best Supporting Actor	1957	Nominated
Thyroid	Arthur Kennedy	Some Came Running	Frank Hirsh	Best Supporting Actor	1958	Nominated
Thyroid	Oprah Winfrey	The Color Purple	Sofia Johnson	Best Supporting Actress	1985	Nominated
Tongue	Michael Douglas	Wall Street	Gordon Gekko	Best Lead Actor	1987	Won
Uterine	Anne Bancroft	The Miracle Worker	Anne Sullivan	Best Lead Actress	1962	Won
Uterine	Anne Bancroft	The Pumpkin Eater	Jo Armitage	Best Lead Actress	1964	Nominated
Uterine	Anne Bancroft	The Graduate	Mrs. Robinson	Best Lead Actress	1967	Nominated
Uterine	Anne Bancroft	The Turning Point	Emma Jacklin	Best Lead Actress	1977	Nominated
Uterine	Anne Bancroft	Agnes of God	Mother Miriam Ruth (née Anna Maria Burchetti)	Best Lead Actress	1985	Nominated
Uterine	Agnes Moorehead	The Magnificent Ambersons	Fanny Minafer	Best Supporting Actress	1942	Nominated
Uterine	Agnes Moorehead	Mrs. Parkington	Baroness Aspasia Conti	Best Supporting Actress	1944	Nominated
Uterine	Agnes Moorehead	Johnny Belinda	Aggie MacDonald	Best Supporting Actress	1948	Nominated
Uterine	Agnes Moorehead	Hush...Hush, Sweet Charlotte	Velma Cruther	Best Supporting Actress	1964	Nominated
Uterine	Kim Stanley	Séance on a Wet Afternoon	Myra Savage	Best Lead Actress	1964	Nominated
Uterine	Kim Stanley	Frances	Lillian Farmer	Best Supporting Actress	1982	Nominated
Uterine	Ethel Waters	Pinky	Dicey Johnson	Best Supporting Actress	1949	Nominated
Vaginal	Andrea Leeds	Stage Door	Kay Hamilton	Best Supporting Actress	1937	Nominated
Various – Unknown Primary Origin (CUP)	Betsy Blair	Marty	Clara Snyder	Best Supporting Actress	1955	Nominated
Various – Unknown Primary Origin (CUP)	Marie Dressler	Min and Bill	Minnie "Min" Divot	Best Lead Actress	1930/ 1931	Won
Various – Unknown Primary Origin (CUP)	Marie Dressler	Emma	Emma Thatcher-Smith	Best Lead Actress	1931/ 1932	Nominated
Various – Unknown Primary Origin (CUP)	Richard Todd	The Hasty Heart	Cpl. Lachlan "Lachie" MacLachlan	Best Lead Actor	1949	Nominated
