= Fast Eddie (nickname) =

Fast Eddie is a fictional character in the 1959 novel The Hustler by Walter Tevis, played by Paul Newman in the 1961 film The Hustler and the 1986 sequel The Color of Money. The character's full name in the novel and both movies was Edward or Eddie "Fast Eddie" Felson.

Fast Eddie or Fast Eddy is also the nickname of:

== People ==
- Fast Eddie (producer) (Edwin A. Smith, fl. from 1987), American hip hop musician
- "Fast" Eddie Clarke (1950–2018), English guitarist and former member of Motörhead
- Edward Davenport (born 1966), English fraudster and socialite
- Edward Dostaler (born 1988), Canadian charity runner
- Paul Edmondson (motorcyclist) (born 1969), British enduro rider
- Eddie Hoh (1944–2015), American rock drummer
- Eddie Johnson (basketball, born 1955) (1955–2020), American basketball player
- Eddie Parker (pool player) (c. 1932 – 2001), American pool player, said to be inspiration for The Hustler character
- Eddie Rickenbacker (1890–1973), American World War I fighter ace and Medal of Honor recipient
- Ed Savitz (1942–1993), American criminal, businessman, and sexual predator
- Eddie Valentine (born 1978), American professional wrestler
- Edward Vrdolyak (born 1937), American politician
- Fast Eddie, pseudonym of the founder of the TV Tropes website

== Fictional characters ==
- Fast Eddie Costigan, in Spider Robinson's "Callahan's" stories such as Callahan's Crosstime Saloon
