= Nine-ball =

Type of cue sport

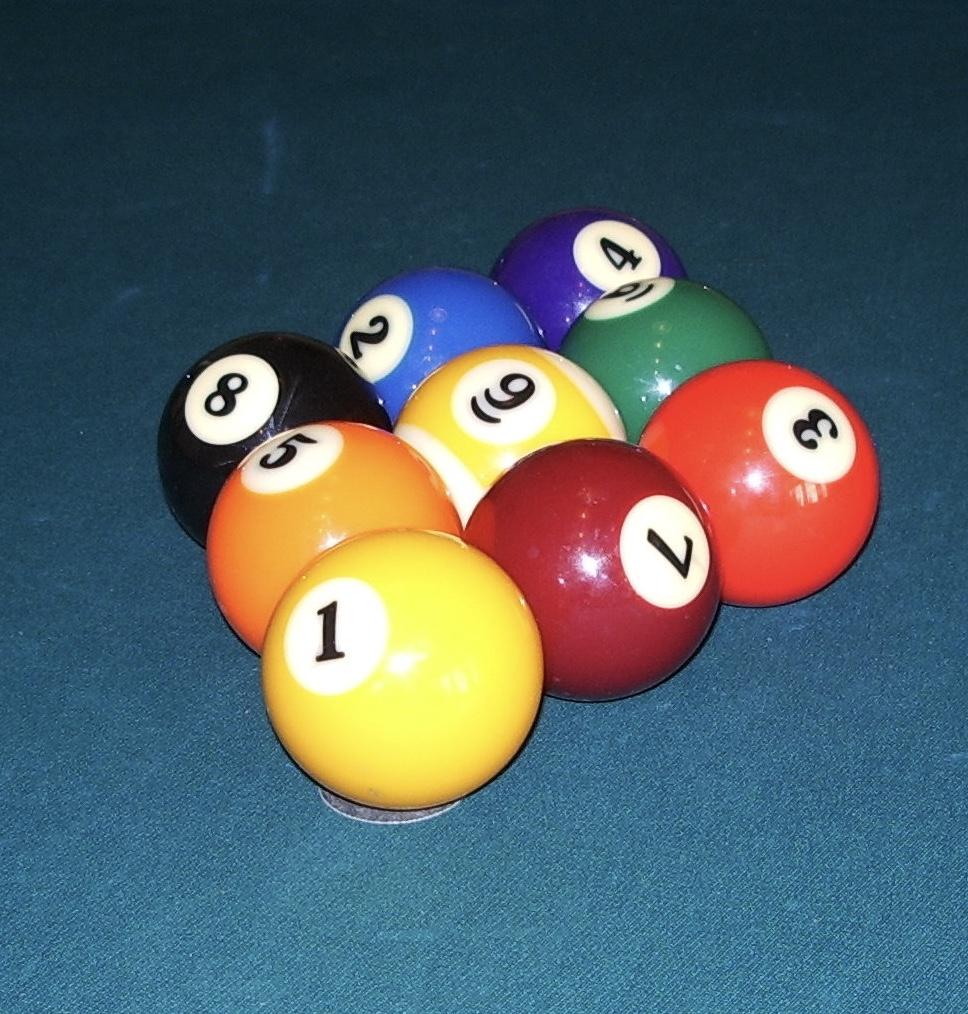
- The nine balls being racked: the 1 ball at the apex centered over the foot spot, the 9 ball at center, the other balls placed randomly, and all balls touching
- Highest governing body: World Pool-Billiard Association
- First played: 1920s

Characteristics
- Contact: No
- Team members: single competitors or doubles
- Mixed-sex: Yes
- Equipment: Cue sports equipment
- Glossary: glossary of cue sports terms

Presence
- Country or region: Worldwide
- World Games: 2001

Nine-ball (sometimes written 9-ball) is a discipline of the cue sport pool. The game's origins are traceable to the 1920s in the United States. It is played on a rectangular billiard table with pockets at each of the four corners and in the middle of each long side. Using a cue stick, players must strike the white cue ball to pocket nine colored billiard balls, hitting them in ascending numerical order. An individual game (or rack) is won by the player pocketing the 9 ball. Matches are usually played as a race to a set number of racks, with the player who reaches the set number winning the match.

The game is currently governed by the World Pool-Billiard Association (WPA), with multiple regional tours. The most prestigious nine-ball tournaments are the WPA World Nine-ball Championship and the U.S. Open Nine-ball Championships. Notable 9-Ball players in the game include Luther Lassiter, Buddy Hall, Efren Reyes, Fedor Gorst, Earl Strickland and Shane Van Boening. The game is often associated with hustling and gambling, with tournaments often having a "buy-in" amount to become a participant. The sport has featured in popular culture, notably in the 1961 film The Hustler and its 1986 sequel The Color of Money.

Nine-ball has been played with varied rules, with games such as ten-ball, seven-ball and three-ball being derived from the game. While usually a singles sport, the game can be played in doubles, with players completing alternate shots. Examples of tournaments featuring doubles include the World Cup of Pool, World Team Championship and the Mosconi Cup.

== History ==
The game was established in America by 1920, although its exact origins are unknown. Nine-ball is played with the same equipment as eight-ball and other pool games.

== Rules ==
The game of nine-ball is played on a billiard table with six pockets. The cue ball, which is usually a solid shade of white (but may be spotted in some tournaments), is struck to hit the nine object balls, which are numbered 1 through 9, each a distinct color, with the 9 ball typically having a yellow stripe on a white base. The aim of the game is to hit the lowest numbered ball on the table (often referred to as the ball on) and pocket balls in succession to eventually pocket the nine-ball. As long as the lowest numbered ball on the table is contacted first by the cueball, and any one or more of the object balls are pocketed in any of the pockets with no foul being committed, a player's inning continues. When the table passes to another player, they must play from where the balls were last positioned, except if the prior inning ended in a foul. In that case, the incoming player takes ball in hand, anywhere on the table. The winner is the player who legally pockets the nine-ball, the game's money ball, regardless of how many balls have been pocketed beforehand. This can happen earlier than the nine-ball being the sole remaining object ball on the table if it is pocketed via a combination or other indirect method.

=== Breaking ===
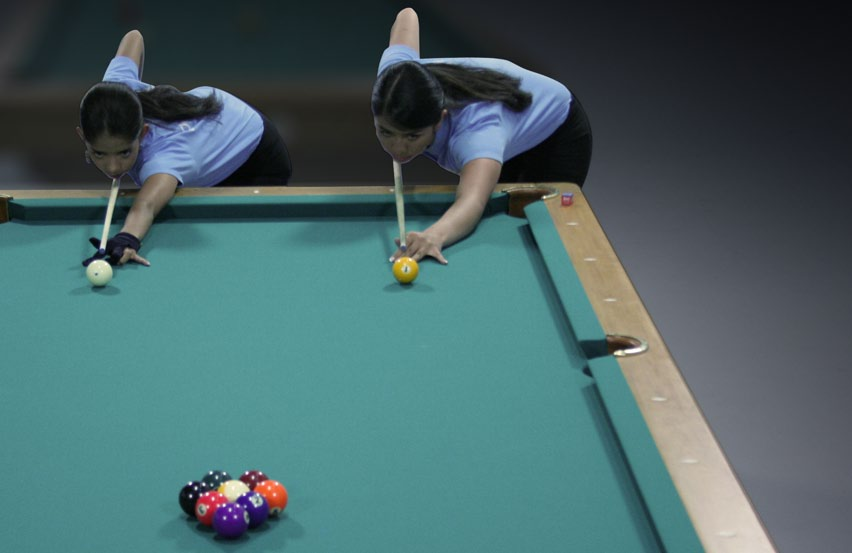
Two players competing in a lag to choose who breaks first.

Each rack begins with the object balls placed in a rack and one player playing a break. The object balls are placed in a diamond-shaped configuration, with the 1 ball positioned at the front, and the 9 ball placed in the center on the foot spot, although some tournaments may rack with the 1 ball on the foot spot. The rack used to position the balls, typically wooden or plastic, may be either triangle-shaped, as is used for eight-ball and other pool games, or a specific diamond-shaped rack that holds only nine balls may be used. A template that lies on the table during the break has also come into use.

The break consists of hitting the 1 ball, with the attempt to pocket any ball. If the 9 ball is successfully potted, the player automatically wins the rack. This is sometimes known as a golden break. Additional rules in some tournaments exist, such as a number of balls having to reach the head string, and players can be chosen to break alternately or whoever won the preceding rack. The break is often the most crucial shot in nine-ball, as it is possible to win a rack without the opponent having taken a single shot. This is often called a break and run, or running the rack. Earl Strickland holds the record for break and runs, after he successfully ran 11 consecutive racks in a tournament in 1996. The first break of a match is sometimes decided by a flip of a coin, but often by playing a lag, with both players playing a cue ball down the table, the closest to the top rail winning the initial break.

=== Push out and fouls ===
After the break, if no fouls were committed, the shooter has the option to continue the rack as usual, or to play a push out. The rules on a push out are different to those of a regular shot, as the shot does not need to hit a rail or ball. After the push out, the opposing player has the option to play the shot that has been left, or to force their opponent to play on from that location. In early versions of nine-ball the push out could be called at any time during the game, but is now only for the shot after the break.

If a player misses potting a ball on a shot, or commits a foul shot, then their opponent plays the next shot. A foul shot can involve not making first contact with the lowest numbered ball, pocketing the cue ball, or, after hitting the lowest numbered ball, not pocketing an object ball and not making contact with a rail by an object ball or the cue ball. A foul shot for any reason offers the opponent ball in hand, which means they can place the cue ball at any location on the table. A player making three successive fouls (for any reason) awards that rack to the opponent. Unlike some other cue sports, such as snooker, players are allowed to jump the cue ball over other balls. However, if any ball leaves the cloth at the end of a shot, it is counted as a foul. Jumping is common in nine-ball, and players often have a dedicated jump cue.

=== European alterations ===
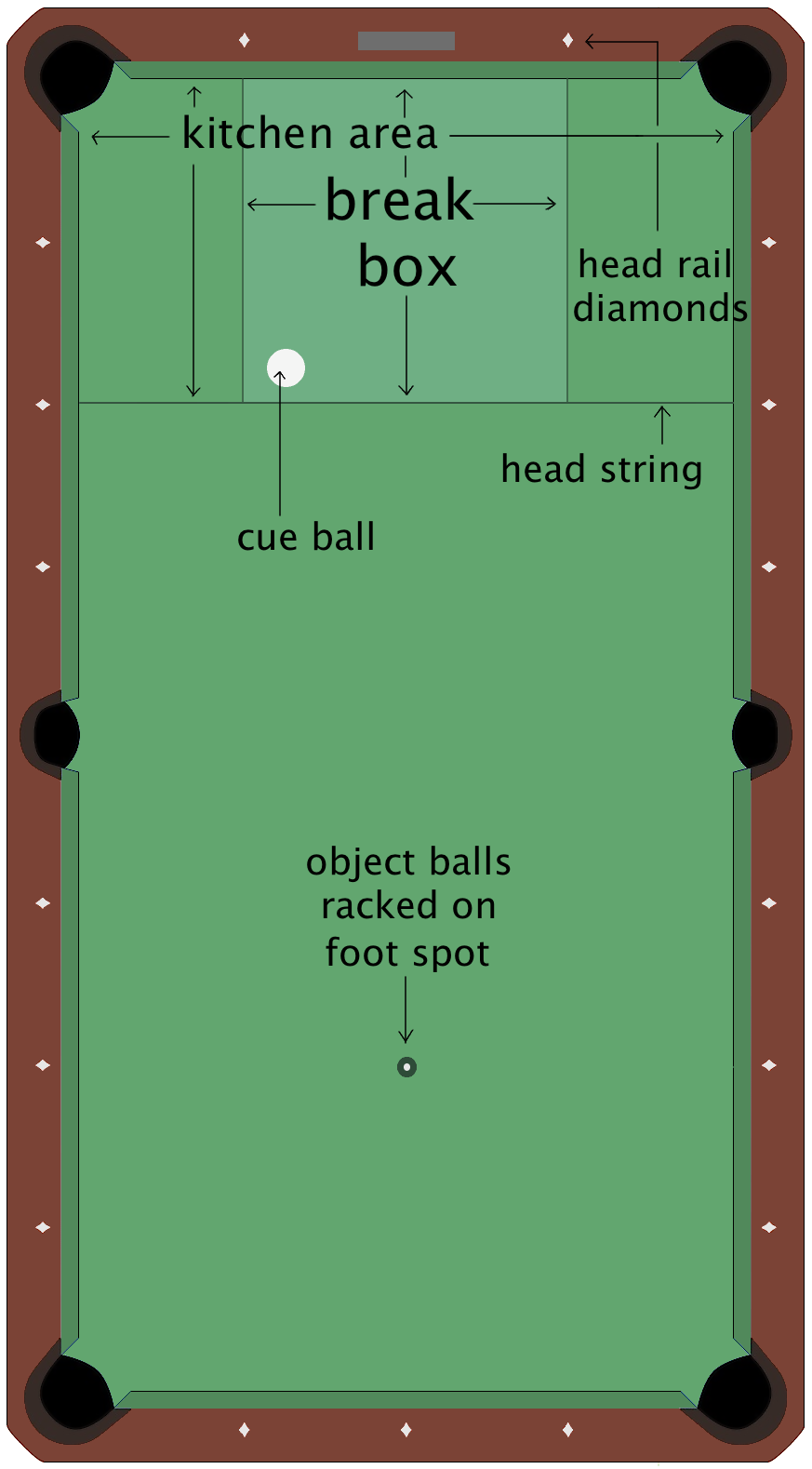
An image showing the break box used on the Euro Tour. This box limits the areas in which a break can be played from.

As of the 2000s, the rules have been somewhat in flux in certain contexts, especially in Europe. The European Pocket Billiard Federation (EPBF), the WPA-affiliate in Europe, has instituted a requirement on the Euro Tour is that the break shot be taken from a "break box" a rectangular box smaller than the regular nine-ball breaking area. While making the money ball on breaks are still possible, they are much more difficult with the break box. This was later used on the annual international Mosconi Cup tournaments. Another Mosconi Cup rule change in 2007 called for racking such that the 9 ball rather than the 1 ball is on the foot spot, which further stops overpowered break-off shots. This rule change was later adopted by the WPA in their 2025 rule changes.

== Governance ==
The general rules of the game are fairly consistent and usually do not stray too far from the earliest format set by the Billiard Congress of America (BCA). These later formed the basis of the standardized WPA rules, which the BCA follows as a member, although amateur league play may be governed by similar but slightly different rules promulgated by the American Poolplayers Association (APA) and other organizations.

=== Tournaments ===
Nine-ball events worldwide are run at the highest level by the WPA. The WPA World Nine-ball Championship has tournaments for men, women and junior players. Events are generally open to any player who can pay the entry fee, however, some events are based on qualification. The WPA hosts a world ranking schedule based on WPA events, with other ranking systems also operated by the APA and the EPBF.

Matchroom Sport, which operates the men's World Nine-ball Championship on behalf of the WPA, also runs the World Nineball Tour, which includes major international competitions the Mosconi Cup, World Cup of Pool, World Pool Masters, U.S. Open 9-Ball Championship, and the International 9-Ball Open. Other major events include the China Open 9-Ball Championship.

Outside those events, nine-ball is played in continental tour series. Events are held on series such as the Asian Tour and Euro Tour.

== Derived games ==
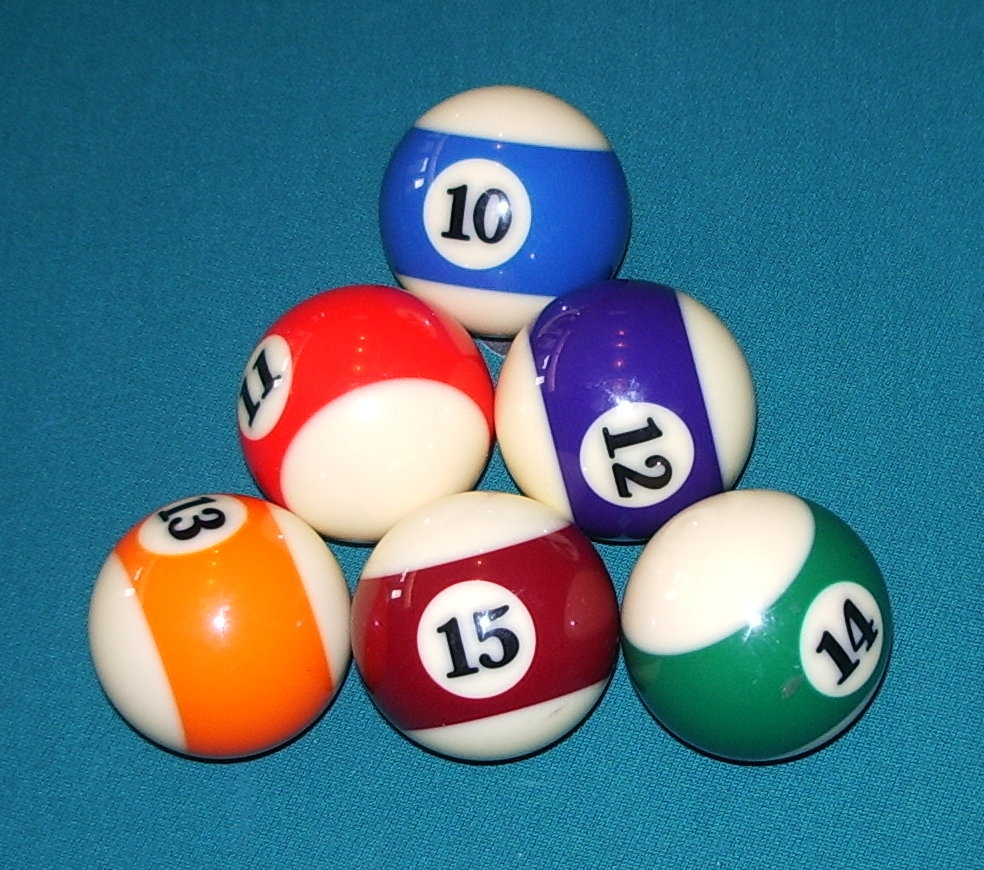
A six-ball rack, played with the leftovers of a nine-ball game; the 10 ball (the lowest) is at the apex, and the 15 is the money ball

Several games have been derived from nine-ball. Six-ball is essentially identical to nine-ball but with three fewer balls, which are racked in a three-row triangle, with the money ball placed in the center of the back row. According to Rudolf Wanderone, the game arose in early 20th century billiard halls; halls charged for matches by the 15 ball rack rather than by table, so players of nine-ball had six balls left over. For this reason, the game is often played with the balls numbered between 10 and 15, with the 15 ball as the money ball.

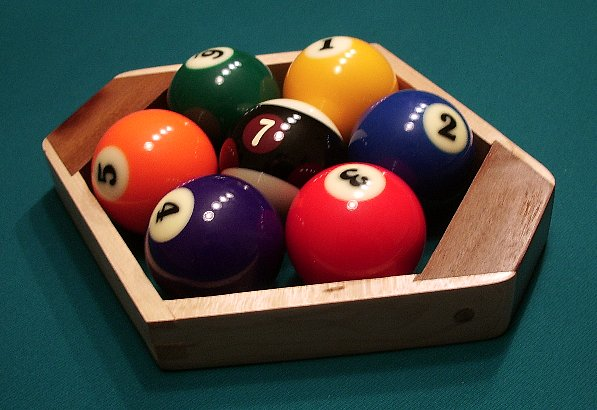
Racking a seven-ball game with a special hexagonal rack and black-striped 7 ball.

Seven-ball is also similar to nine-ball, though it differs in two key ways: the game uses only seven object balls, which are racked in a hexagon, and players are restricted to pocketing the money ball on their designated side of the table. William D. Clayton is credited with the game's invention in the early 1980s. While not a common game, it was featured on television broadcaster ESPN's Sudden Death Seven-ball which aired in the early 2000s.

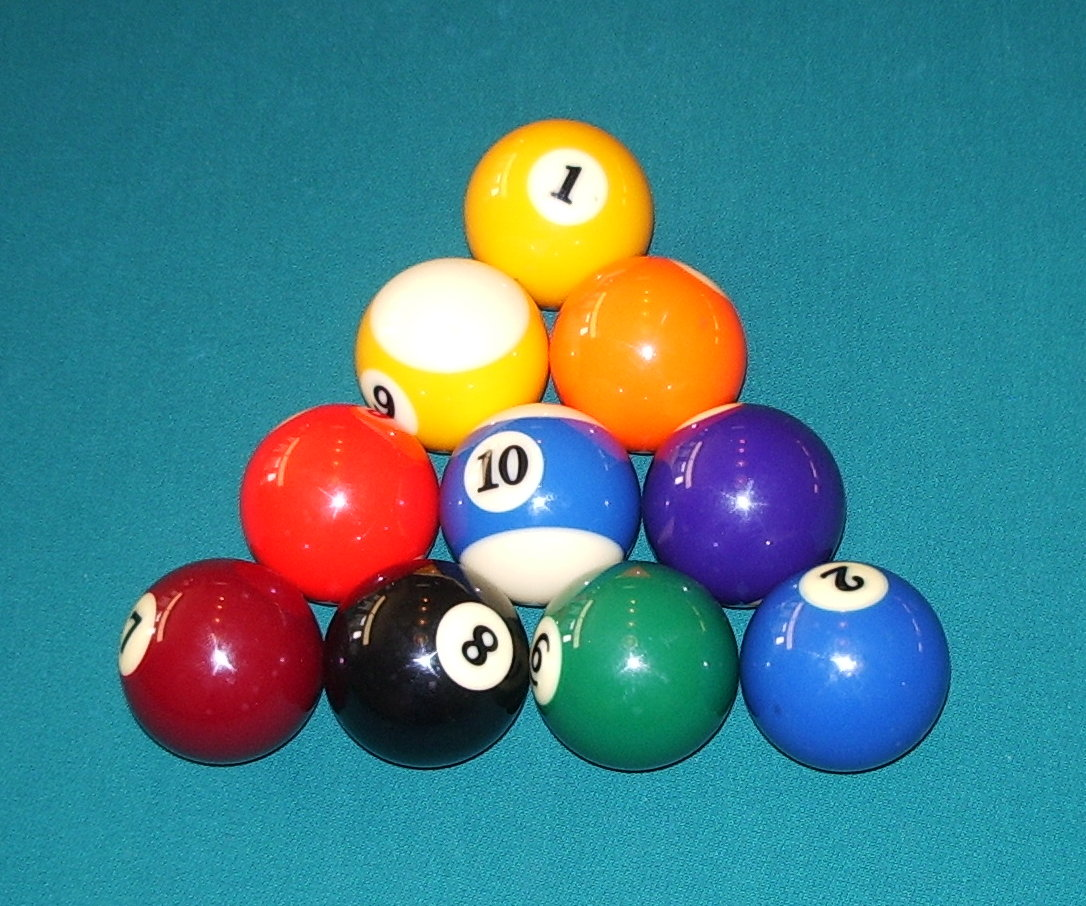
A valid ten-ball rack; the 1 is at the apex on the foot spot, and the 10 (the money ball) is in the center.

The most common derivative game is the game of ten-ball. The game is a more stringent variant, using ten balls in which all pocketed balls must be called. Unlike in nine-ball, the money ball cannot be pocketed on the break for an instant win. Due to its more challenging nature, and the fact that there is no publicly known technique for reliably pocketing specific object balls on the break shot, there have been suggestions among the professional circuit that ten-ball should replace nine-ball as the pro game of choice, especially since the rise of the nine-ball soft break, which is still legal in most international and non-European competition. Ten-ball has its own world championship known as the WPA World Ten-ball Championship.

== Popular culture ==
The sport has featured in popular culture, most notably in the 1959 novel The Hustler and its 1961 film adaptation, and the 1984 sequel novel The Color of Money and subsequent film. In Endless Ocean: Blue World, Nineball Island, which serves as the player's home base, is won through a game of nine-ball.

== See also ==
- List of WPA World Nine-ball Champions
- Glossary of cue sports terms
