= Color of money =

Color of money or colour of money may refer to:

- Color of money, a term used in government procurement
- The Color of Money (novel), a 1984 novel by Walter Tevis
  - The Color of Money, a 1986 drama film directed by Martin Scorsese and featuring Paul Newman and Tom Cruise, loosely adapted from the novel
- The Color of Money, a 1988 series of investigative reports by Bill Dedman
- The Colour of Money (game show), a 2009 British game show
- The Colour of Money, a customer magazine of Triodos Bank

== See also ==
- "What's the Colour of Money?", a 1986 song by Hollywood Beyond
