= George Balabushka =

Russian-born billiards cue maker

- George Balabushka in his garage-based carpentry shop.
- Born: Gregori Balabushka; December 9, 1912; Russia
- Died: December 5, 1975 (aged 62); New York City, U.S.

George Balabushka (Russian: Григорий Антонович Балабушка Grigoriy Antonovich Balabushka; December 9, 1912 – December 5, 1975) was a Russian-born billiards cue maker, arguably one of the most prominent members of that profession. His full name or last name standing alone is often used to refer to a cue stick made by him. Arriving in the U.S. in 1924, he worked at various carpentry and toy and furniture making jobs. He was an avid pool player and purchased a pool room with a business partner in 1959 and thereafter started making cues as gifts for friends, which quickly blossomed into a business when others wanted to purchase them.

Balabushka turned out approximately 1,200 handcrafted cues during his 16-year cue-making career, spanning from 1959 to his death in 1975. His cues are highly valued collector's items, made more so after being prominently featured in Martin Scorsese's 1986 film The Color of Money. Balabushka cues are generally separated into three distinct classes and time periods related to what blanks Balabushka was using in cue construction: The Titlist blank era (1959–1966), the Burton Spain blank era (1966–1971), and the Gus Szamboti blank era (1971–1975). Original Balabushka cues with verified provenance may realize tens of thousands of dollars at auction.

== Life and career ==
=== Early life ===
George Balabushka was born in Russia on December 9, 1912, and immigrated to the United States in 1924 at 12 years of age. His family, parents Anton and Natalie and younger sister Mary, settled in New York City. Although originally named Gregori, according to Balabushka he was given a new first name, George, by immigration officials when he was processed through Ellis Island. (In reality, immigrants changed their names themselves later, because immigration officials never altered names. According to Marian L. Smith, senior historian of the U.S. Citizenship and Immigration Service, there is no known case of a name changed at Ellis Island.)

=== Employment ===
Balabushka's first job was as a wooden toy designer and maker, working for the Educational Equipment Company, then located at 71 West 23rd St., in Manhattan, which made building blocks for nurseries and schools. Thereafter he built children's furniture for the Playtime Woodworking Company located on Greenwich Village's Jane Street. While on the job, Balabushka lost his middle finger to a band saw. Using a wooden mold, he made himself a replacement plastic finger of such craftsmanship that even his friends did not realize his loss until long after the incident. As Balabushka's carpentry skills deepened he began building accordions and other detailed carpentry pieces on his own time. In 1949, Balabushka applied for patent on a folding leg bracket mechanism he invented, which was granted in 1951.

=== Marriage and children ===
While working at Playtime Woodworking he met a woman named Josephine, his future wife, who then lived directly across the street from the toy company. They were married in 1941, and bought a home in Brooklyn several years later. Josephine and George had two sons, Gregory and George, both named after their father.

Josephine was not just a source of love and stability but was the rock that allowed Balabushka the ability to hone his craft. According to the writers of The Billiard Encyclopedia, "Josephine's limitless patience and strong sense of independence would afford George the time and solitude necessary that a great artist needs in order to perfect his craft."

=== Transition to cuemaker ===
Balabushka was an avid billiards player, especially of the game of straight pool, taking part in competitions and spending time with well-known practitioners of the sport. In 1959, he purchased a Brooklyn-based pool hall with partner, Frank McGown, which was located at 50th Street and 5th Avenue. While running the room, he began repairing cues as a hobby, and soon the idea was sparked to design and manufacture his own line of pool cues.

By the end of 1959, Balabushka had made a number of cues, most of which were given to friends as Christmas gifts. As this practice went on, he began receiving orders for his cues. His first cues were conversions of the popular Brunswick-Balke-Collender Company manufactured "Titlist" cues, which were one-piece cues; that is, they had no joint in the middle that would allow a player to break down the cue into two sections for ease of transport. At the time he started, there were very few private cuemakers, the industry being dominated by large manufacturers.

=== Cuemaking career and death ===
Between 1959 and 1962, Balabushka handcrafted between 20 and 30 cues per year on a part-time basis. Because of the relative dearth of private cuemakers and the excellence of his product, Balabushka's name quickly became known amongst professional players. By the end of 1962, Balabushka was receiving more orders than he could fill. Balabushka sold his interest in the pool room, converted his garage into a carpentry workshop, and by 1964 was building cues full-time, while continuing to hone his cuemaking abilities.

Unlike many of the large manufacturers of the day, Balabushka's emphasis was on playing ability and fine craftsmanship, reflecting the values he had held during his years in the woodworking business. He was an innovator in cue construction, cue finishes and cue design. Balabushka's cues were not the elaborately decorated attempts at building art that became a mainstay of the cue market starting in the 1980s. Rather, most Balabushka cues are relatively plain and without grand ornamentation flourishes. Many of his trademark construction techniques have become standard in the industry, such as the use of Irish linen for wrap material and block style checkered-pattern ringwork above a cue's wrap, commonly employing alternating ebony and ivory, pieces which are eponymously named "Bushka rings."

George Balabushka died in 1975 at the age of 62. He was posthumously honored as the first inductee into the American Cuemakers Association Hall of Fame in February, 1993. In 2004, he was inducted into the Meritorious Service category of the Billiard Congress of America's Hall of Fame.

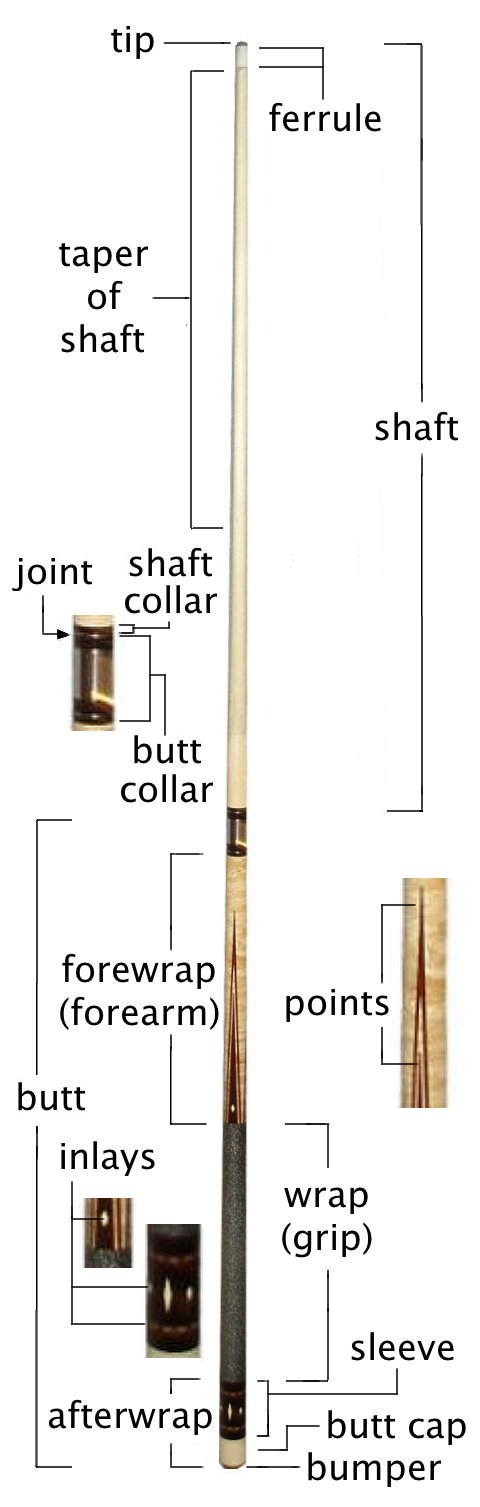
A pool cue and its major parts.

== Cue details ==
There are three distinct classes of cues produced during different time periods related to what blanks Balabushka was using in cue construction: The Titlist blank era (1959–1966), the Burton Spain blank era (1966–1971) and the Gus Szamboti blank era (1971–1975). The "blanks" referred to are the bottom (butt) portion of a cue where the splicing of various hardwoods has been completed but the cue has not yet been turned on a lathe to produce the final shape, and certain features have not yet been added such as a wrap, joint mechanism, butt cap, bumper and any inlays.

While blank variety is the defining demarcation between one Balabushka cue and another, there are some shared features spanning Balabushka's fleeting 16-year career. Cue forearms were characteristically made with straight-grained maple, based on Balabushka's belief that a single-direction maple grain provided superior integrity to that of curly maple or birdseye maple. He used stainless steel joints and delrin butt caps almost exclusively. A small number of his cues feature ivory joints and ivory butt caps, making them highly valued collector's items. Balabushka used a distinguishing reddish-brown bumper, and employed Cortland Irish linen for many of his wraps, with the highly sought after leather wrap a rare departure for him and a distinct value enhancer. Unless a different length was specified, Balabushka made all his cues to a standard 57½ inches in length.

In addition to Bushka rings, various other decorative rings were commonly incorporated, including various colored plastics (often marbleized), and silver and contrasting wooden rings. For decoration, Balabushka often inlaid small mother-of-pearl dots and notched diamonds. Series of window-shaped maple pieces commonly adorned Balabushka butt sleeves, with each window usually featuring one burl for its aesthetic effect. Some other features common to many other cuemakers' lines from the same era are notably absent or mostly absent from Balabushka's, including ivory inlays and the signing of his cues. A long-standing controversy exists over what finish Balabushka used. One side argues that he used an oil finish on all his cues, while the other insists that his later cues were coated with a spray lacquer.

=== Titlist era ===
When Balabushka first started repairing cues while working at his pool room, he started converting house cues into custom cues. Many of these house cues were made by Brunswick. When he started building his own cues in 1959, he used blanks purchased from Brunswick for their "Titlist" cue line; the same used in the construction of the house cues he had been converting. Many of the fine cuemakers working during the same era as Balabushka did likewise, including Frank Paradise (Paradise cues), Eugene Balner (Palmer cues, named after Arnold Palmer) and Ernie Gutierrez (Ginacue), all following in the footsteps of earlier cuemaker, Herman Rambow.

Building a full spliced blank from scratch was an expensive and painstaking process, and the large manufacturing facilities of Brunswick turned out good quality blanks, with beautiful points, veneers and sound construction. In Balabushka's case, his entire workshop consisted of a single lathe and other woodworking equipment in the confines of his modest garage, and building his own full-splice butts would have been prohibitively difficult and expensive for him.

=== Burton Spain era ===
Balabushka used Titlist blanks until 1966 when he was contacted by Chicagoan Burton Spain. Spain had recently begun making handmade spliced blanks and was supplying them to Balabushka's closest rival, Frank Paradise. Spain had become fascinated by splicing technology when he came upon a Titlist cue split down the middle in 1965 and set out to perfect and even improve on the Titlist splice. Spain's original intent was to be predominantly a cuemaker in his own right using his proprietary spliced blanks. However, by 1966 Spain's superior blanks were in high demand and he instead turned to making blanks for other cuemakers full-time, which he continued until 1970.

Balabushka took Spain up on his offer after seeing the quality of his splices. Buying from Spain also had the advantage that he was able to have Spain customize the blanks to his specifications. During this period Balabushka began incorporating more elaborate details into his cues, including the eponymous Bushka rings innovation. Many later cuemakers would install Bushka rings both above the wrap and on the butt sleeve below the wrap. Balabushka used them only above the wrap, which is believed to have aided him in keeping the balance point higher on the cue. In 1970, Spain sold his cue business to tool and die maker John Davis, who had been assisting Spain for a number of years. Balabushka continued buying blanks from Davis until 1971.

=== Gus Szamboti era ===
In 1971, Balabushka met Penndel, Pennsylvania, native Gus Szamboti at a tournament. Szamboti had been working for RCA as a draftsman and designer, but RCA layoffs were common at the time, and he had started designing and selling pool cues as a more stable job path. Though he too started production with Titlist blanks as well as blanks manufactured by WICO of Chicago, Szamboti later began making his own. Balabushka was very impressed with Szamboti's blanks and, in addition to the two men becoming fast friends, he became Szamboti's first customer, buying blanks from him for $18 apiece.

Balabushka cues from the Gus Szamboti era are typified by straight grained maple forearms bearing four ebony points, with four veneers included, normally colored black, green, white and mahogany, or sometimes with an orange veneer in place of mahogany. Balabushka cues from this era, spanning the last five years of his life, are considered the finest of his career as a class. There have been unconfirmed rumors that some few cues made during this period included splices made by Balabushka himself.

== Prominence ==
It is estimated that Balabushka produced between 1,000 and 1,200 cues during his lifetime. However, by the mid-1960s, forged Balabushka cues started circulating in the market, as he was already recognized as the premier US cue maker of the era, referred to as "the Stradivarius of cuemakers". Balabushka and his cues achieved much wider recognition after being prominently featured in Martin Scorsese's 1986 film, The Color of Money (the sequel to the classic 1961 film The Hustler).

In the film, Tom Cruise’s character, Vincent Lauria, is presented with a cue by Paul Newman's character, Fast Eddie Felson. Vincent takes the cue, his reverence obvious, and whispers "a Balabushka..." After this, Balabushka's name became associated by the general public with highly valued and rare cues. The cue used in the film was, however, not a genuine Balabushka, but another cue was made to look like a Balabushka. The filmmakers feared that any cue used might get damaged during filming; especially in the scene set in a pool room where Cruise's character rapidly whirls the cue around in time to the song Werewolves of London. An original Balabushka was thus considered too valuable to be risked in the production.

Original Balabushka cues with verified provenance may realize tens of thousands of dollars at auction. In 1994, for example, a Balabushka was purchased by a collector for $45,000. In a 1998 Syracuse Herald-Journal article a collection of thirty original Balabushkas cues and six Gus Szamboti cues was estimated to be worth 2 million dollars, the cues said to be the equivalent in the cue collecting world of Rembrandts and van Goghs. There are, however, many fake Balabushka cues in existence. Complicating matters, in the 1980s with the permission and license of his surviving family, a line of Balabushka replicas began to be manufactured in large quantities by the Adam Custom Cue Company.
