= 1961 New York Film Critics Circle Awards =

27th New York Film Critics Circle Awards

27th New York Film Critics Circle Awards

January 20, 1962
(announced December 28, 1961)

West Side Story

The 27th New York Film Critics Circle Awards honored the best filmmaking of 1961.

== Winners ==
- Best Film:
  - West Side Story
- Best Actor:
  - Maximilian Schell - Judgment at Nuremberg
- Best Actress:
  - Sophia Loren - Two Women (La ciociara)
- Best Director:
  - Robert Rossen - The Hustler
- Best Screenplay:
  - Abby Mann - Judgment at Nuremberg
- Best Foreign Language Film:
  - La Dolce Vita • Italy/France
