= Robert Rossen =

American filmmaker (1908–1966)

- Rossen c. 1960
- Born: Robert Rosen; March 16, 1908; New York City, U.S.
- Died: February 18, 1966 (aged 57); New York City, U.S.
- Occupations: Film director; screenwriter; film producer
- Years active: 1932–1963
- Spouse: Sue Siegel (m. 1936)
- Children: 3
- Relatives: Daniel Rossen (grandson)

Robert Rossen (March 16, 1908 – February 18, 1966) was an American screenwriter, film director, and producer whose film career spanned almost three decades.

His 1949 film All the King's Men won Oscars for Best Picture, Best Actor and Best Supporting Actress, while Rossen was nominated for the Academy Award for Best Director. He won the Golden Globe for Best Director and the film won the Golden Globe Award for Best Picture. In 1961, he directed The Hustler, which was nominated for nine Oscars and won two.

After directing and writing for the stage in New York, Rossen moved to Hollywood in 1937. From there, he worked as a screenwriter for Warner Bros. until 1941, and then interrupted his career to serve until 1944 as the chairman of the Hollywood Writers Mobilization, a body to organize writers for the effort in World War II. In 1945, he joined a picket line against Warner Bros. After making one film for Hal B. Wallis's newly formed production company, Rossen made one for Columbia Pictures, another for Wallis and most of his later films for his own companies, usually in collaboration with Columbia.

Rossen was a member of the American Communist Party from 1937 to about 1947, and believed the Party was "dedicated to social causes of the sort that we as poor Jews from New York were interested in."

He ended all relations with the Party in 1949. Rossen was twice called before the House Un-American Activities Committee (HUAC), in 1951 and in 1953. He exercised his Fifth Amendment rights at his first appearance, refusing to state whether he had ever been a Communist. As a result, he found himself blacklisted by Hollywood studios as well as unable to renew his passport. At his second appearance he named 57 people as current or former Communists and his blacklisting ended. In order to repair finances he produced his next film, Mambo, in Italy in 1954. While The Hustler in 1961 was a great success, conflicts on the set of Lilith in 1964 so disillusioned him that it was his last film before his death two years later.

== Biography ==
=== Early life and career ===
Robert Rosen was born on March 16, 1908, and raised on the Lower East Side of New York City. His parents were Russian Jewish immigrants; his father, Philip Rosen, was a house painter. As a youth, he attended New York University, hustled pool and fought some prizefights – the latter two providing crucial background for his two greatest films, The Hustler and Body and Soul, respectively. He changed his name from Rosen to Rossen in 1931.

He started his theatrical career as a stage manager and director in stock and off-Broadway productions, mainly in the social and radical theaters that flourished in New York in the early and mid-1930s, as did John Huston, Elia Kazan and Joseph Losey. In 1932 Rossen directed John Wexley's Steel, about labor agitation, and Richard Maibaum's The Tree, about a lynching. A year later Rossen directed Birthright, in which Maibaum attacked Nazism, which had just triumphed in Germany with the dictatorship of Adolf Hitler in 1933.

In 1935, Rossen wrote and directed his first play, The Body Beautiful, a comedy about a naive burlesque dancer. Although the play closed after four performances, Warner Bros. director Mervyn LeRoy was so impressed that he signed Rossen to a personal screenwriting contract.

=== Marriage ===
In 1936, Rossen married Susan Siegal; the couple had three children: Carol, Stephen and Ellen.

=== Work in Hollywood ===
For his first credit in Hollywood, in 1937 Rossen co-wrote with Abem Finkel a script based on the prosecution of crime lord Lucky Luciano and eventually titled Marked Woman. Although some of Warner Bros. management saw Rossen as an unknown quantity, the result won praise from both Jack L. Warner and the Daily Worker. Rossen's first solo script was for They Won't Forget (1937), a fictionalized account of the lynching of Leo Frank, featuring Lana Turner in her debut performance.

Dust Be My Destiny, co-written in 1939 by Rossen, is the story of a fugitive from justice who is eventually acquitted with help from an attorney and a journalist, the latter arguing that "a million boys all over the country" were in a similar plight. Warner Bros. then ordered producer Lou Edelman to cut the script, adding that "This is the story of two people – not a group. It is an individual problem – not a national one." Rossen was one of three writers on the gangster melodrama The Roaring Twenties, released in 1939. A remake of the 1932 play and film Life Begins was written in 1939 by Rossen and released in 1940 as A Child Is Born. The plot recounted the experiences of six expectant mothers, and there was little scope to modify the original.

The Sea Wolf, released in 1941, was based on Jack London's novel. Although the film had a strong cast and production, Rossen's re-draft of the script may be the greatest influence on the film. While the character of Captain Larsen remained both victim and oppressed in a capitalist hierarchy, he became a symbol of fascism. He split the novel's idealist hero into an intellectual bosun and a rebellious seaman. Warner Bros. cut many political points during production.

Blues in the Night, written by Rossen and two colleagues and released in 1941, shows a group of jazz musicians traveling in the Depression. Their informal methods represent working-class culture rather than the commercialized music of the big bands. However, The New York Times' reviewer thought the soundtrack was "about all the film has to offer", and Warner was disappointed with the sales.

After the attack on Pearl Harbor on December 7, 1941, the Screen Writers Guild set up on December 8, 1941, the Hollywood Writers Mobilization, a body to organize writers for the war effort. Rossen served as the body's chairman until 1944 and advocated the opening of a Second Front to support West European resistance against the Nazis. His earnings were much greater than in 1937. However, his work for Hollywood Writers Mobilization and for the Communist Party forced him to abandon some partly developed film projects, including The Treasure of the Sierra Madre, which John Huston eventually directed in 1948.

In 1945 Rossen joined a picket line against Warner Bros, making an enemy of Jack Warner. Rossen signed a contract with an independent production company formed by Hal Wallis, who had previously been Warner Bros.' head of production. However Rossen wrote only two full scripts for this company, The Strange Love of Martha Ivers in 1946 and Desert Fury in 1947. In The Strange Love of Martha Ivers Rossen used a short story by John Patrick to introduce the main plot, which was set 15 years later and which Rossen wrote. The relationship between Rossen and Wallis broke down when Rossen received offers from other production companies.

Dick Powell had been a crooner but was making a new career as a dramatic actor. When Columbia Pictures agreed to make Johnny O'Clock for him in 1947, Powell successfully campaigned for Rossen to direct, and this became Rossen's debut in directing. As this crime melodrama proved a modest success, Roberts Productions signed Rossen to direct Abraham Polonsky's script of Body and Soul, described by Bob Thomas as "possibly the best prizefight film ever made." Rossen preferred an ending in which the hero wins a boxing match and then is killed by a gangster, but Polonsky insisted on his own ending, in which the hero escapes into obscurity before the fight. Following the success of Body and Soul, Rossen formed his own production company and signed with Columbia Pictures a contract that gave him wide autonomy over every second film that he made at the studio.

All the King's Men (1949) was based on the novel of the same name by Robert Penn Warren, which in turn was based on the career of politician Huey Long. Rossen introduced a new concept, that the defenders of the ordinary people can in turn become the new exploiters. As a requirement for his participation in the film, Rossen had to write to Columbia's Harry Cohn saying that he was no longer a Communist Party member. Cohn's critiques of the draft of Rossen's script included scrapping a framing structure that was difficult for audiences to follow and several improvements in the relationships and motivations of characters. A meeting of the Communist Party in Los Angeles severely criticized the film, and Rossen severed all relations with the Party. All the King's Men won the Academy Award for Best Picture, Broderick Crawford won the award for Best Actor and Mercedes McCambridge was honored as Best Supporting Actress. Rossen was nominated for the Academy Award for Best Director but lost to Joseph L. Mankiewicz for A Letter to Three Wives. Rossen won the Golden Globe for Best Director and the film won the Golden Globe for Best Picture. His next film, The Brave Bulls, was directed in 1950 and released in 1951. This was Rossen's last work before the studios blacklisted him. New York Times critic Bosley Crowther called this "the best film on bull-fighting yet."

=== Examinations by HUAC ===
After the end of World War II in 1945, the spread of Communism became the major concern in the United States. In 1946, the Republicans gained an overwhelming majority in the Congressional elections. and used this power to investigate Communist elements in the media. The Communist victory of China in 1949 and the start of the Korean War in 1950 reinforced the anti-communist concerns present at the time.

During hearings in 1947, Jack Warner included Rossen among the many openly leftist writers whom his studio Warner Bros. had hired as the earliest and most openly anti-Nazi studio in Hollywood. (Warner Bros. had made Confessions of a Nazi Spy [1939] and was criticized by the Republicans for their leftist writers at the time.) Warner reportedly accused Rossen of incorporating communist propaganda in scripts and fired him as a result, though some believe he was also unhappy with the writers’ union activities.

Rossen was one of 19 "unfriendly witnesses" subpoenaed in October 1947 by the House Un-American Activities Committee (HUAC) during the second Red Scare but was one of eight not called to testify. In 1951, Rossen was named as a Communist by several HUAC witnesses and he appeared before HUAC for the first time in June 1951. He exercised his rights under the Fifth Amendment against self-incrimination, taking what came to be known as the "augmented Fifth". He testified that he was not a member of the Communist Party and that he disagreed with the aims of the party, but when asked to state whether he had ever been a member of the party, Rossen refused to answer. He was placed on the unofficial blacklist by the Hollywood studios, and Columbia broke its production contract with him.

In a widespread practice during HUAC investigations, the U.S. State Department refused to renew Rossen's passport. This, and his inability to find work, brought Rossen, like his friend, ex-Communist Elia Kazan, back to the committee in May 1953, where he identified 57 people as Communists. He explained to the committee why he chose to testify: "I don't think, after two years of thinking, that any one individual can indulge himself in the luxury of personal morality or pit it against what I feel today very strongly is the security and safety of this nation." Stephen Rossen later shed light on his father's decision:

It killed him not to work. He was torn between his desire to work and his desire not to talk, and he didn't know what to do. What I think he wanted to know was, what would I think of him if he talked? He didn't say it in that way, though. Then he explained to me the politics of it—how the studios were in on it, and there was never any chance of his working. He was under pressure, he was sick, his diabetes was bad, and he was drinking. By this time I understood that he had refused to talk before and had done his time, from my point of view. What could any kid say at that point? You say, 'I love you and I'm behind you.'

Like Elia Kazan's testimony, Rossen's HUAC admissions destroyed many lifelong friendships, along with impacting the careers of many of Rossen's colleagues. Kazan's career flourished and Rossen's career also quickly regained the productivity he had enjoyed prior to the blacklist. He produced, directed and co-wrote The Hustler, in 1961, and he was nominated for Best Picture, Best Director, and Best Writing, Screenplay Based on Material from Another Medium Academy Awards, sharing the nomination with his co-writer Sidney Carroll.

=== Return to filmmaking ===
From 1952 to 1953, Rossen wrote Mambo, trying to repair his finances after almost two years without work following the 1951 HUAC hearing. He had to produce the film in Italy, and it was premiered in Italy in 1954 and the US in 1955. Rossen later said "Mambo was to be for fun only," but he "took it seriously, and it didn't come off." Critics dismissed the film. However, in 2001, Dorothea Fischer-Hornung concluded that the film achieved more than Rossen and contemporary critics realized. The female lead resolves her own conflicts by devoting herself to dance. Katherine Dunham's choreography highlights this process; and innovative cinematography intensifies the dance scenes.

Rossen hoped Alexander the Great (1956) would be a blockbuster, but the majority of the reviews criticized the film for failing to keep the audience's interest. However, the review from The New York Times wrote that "its moments of boredom are rare...an overlong but thoughtful and spectacular entertainment."

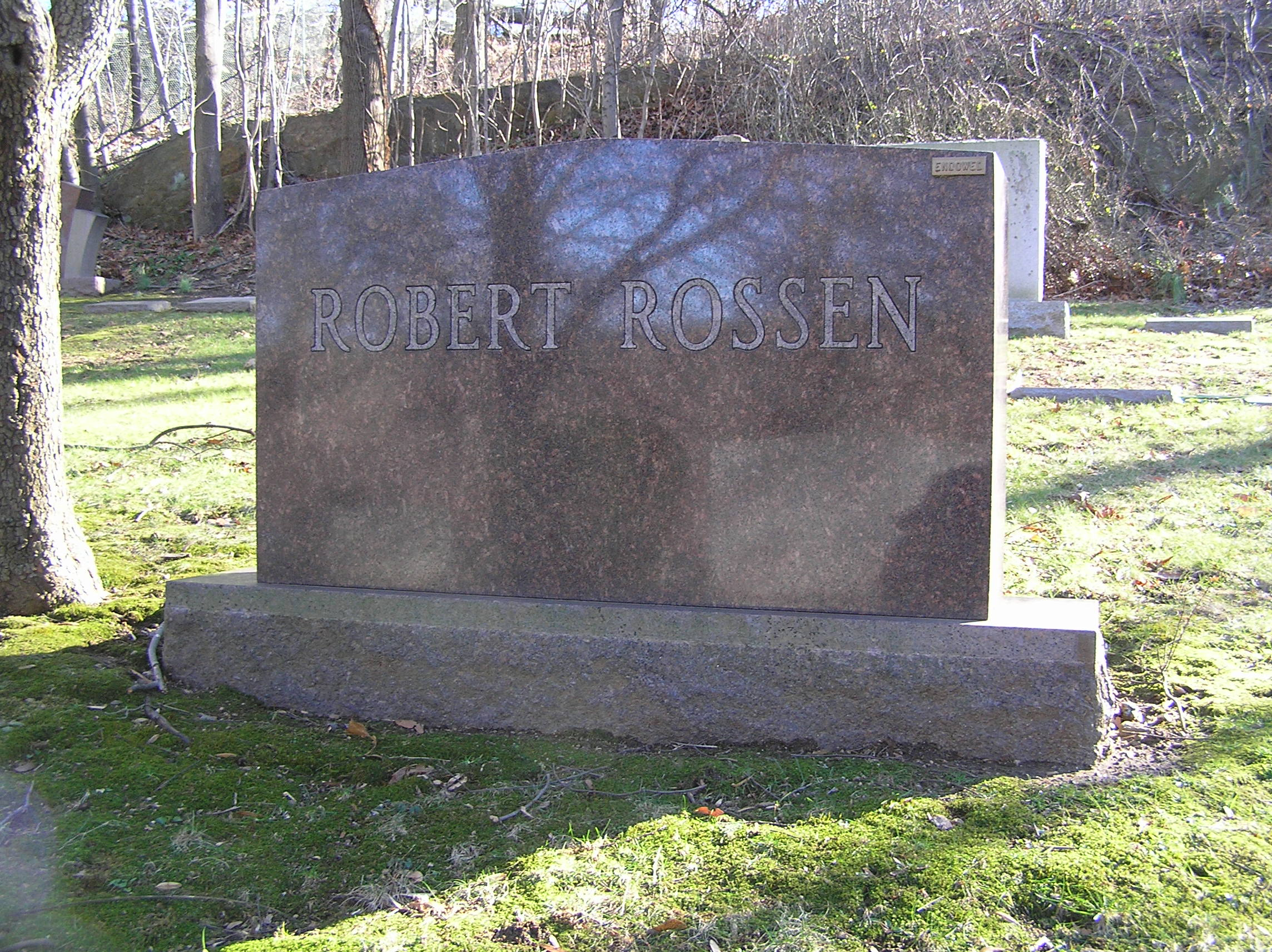
The gravesite of Robert Rossen

In 1961, Rossen co-wrote, produced and directed The Hustler. Drawing upon his own experiences as a pool hustler, he teamed with Sidney Carroll to adapt the novel of the same name for the screen. The Hustler was nominated for nine Academy Awards and won two. Rossen was nominated as Best Director, and with Carroll for Best Adapted Screenplay, but did not win either award. He was named Best Director by the New York Film Critics Circle and shared with Carroll the Writers Guild of America Award for Best Written Drama. The Hustler was an enormous popular success and is credited with sparking a resurgence in the popularity of pool in the United States, which had been on the decline for decades.

Rossen was already ill when he started on his final film, Lilith (1964), and it was poorly received in the United States. After it Rossen lost interest in directing, reportedly because of conflicts with the film's star, Warren Beatty. The filmmaker said, "It isn't worth that kind of grief. I won't take it any more. I have nothing to say on the screen right now. Even if I never make another picture, I've got The Hustler on my record. I'm content to let that one stand for me." However, at the time of his death Rossen was planning Cocoa Beach, a script he conceived in 1962, showing the hopes and struggles of transients in a local community and contrasting this with nearby Cape Canaveral, which Leftist writer Brian Neve described as a "symbol of America's imperial reach".

== Death ==
Rossen died in New York City at age 57 on February 18, 1966, following a series of illnesses and is interred at Westchester Hills Cemetery in Hastings-on-Hudson, New York. His grandchild, Daniel Rossen, is the guitarist/vocalist of alternative bands Grizzly Bear and Department of Eagles.

== Reception ==
Rossen was one of the directors who developed film gris (French for "grey film"). In his films for Warner Brothers between 1937 and 1944, consistent themes were the conditions of working people, the portrayal of gangsters and racketeers, and opposition to fascism. After Dust Be My Destiny, written by Rossen and released in 1939, Frank Nugent, who regularly reviewed for The New York Times, complained about Warner Brothers' long line of melodramas about boys from poor neighborhoods. Unlike filmmakers such as John Ford and Howard Hawks, Rossen was willing to explain his aims as a director: "The element common to many of my films is the desire for success, ambition, which is an important element in American life. It is an important element, and has become increasingly more important in what is known as Western Civilization." Polonsky commented that "Rossen's talent is force applied everywhere without let-up." Neve acknowledged that social concerns were central in most of Rossen's works, but commented that Lilith was different from Rossen's earlier films as it emphasized mood rather than narrative and examined through pictures and silences the nature of maladjustment and madness.

Farber noted the strong female characters of the 1930s and 1940s, and laments the replacement of them by all-male relationships from the 1950s onward. For the earlier pattern Farber cited Rossen's 1946 script The Strange Love of Martha Ivers, which was over melodramatic but portrayed a woman consumed by power, money and success. Lilith created one of the few strong women in the 1960s. Rossen generally destroyed the main character.

All of Rossen's playscripts were adaptations except Marked Woman, Racket Buster and Alexander the Great, based on real events. Before he was blacklisted in 1951, only two of Rossen's adaptions were of serious novels, and Rossen's early drafts of the script for All the King's Men received serious criticisms within Columbia.

While head of production at Warner, Hal Wallis considered that some of his best films – including The Roaring Twenties, Marked Woman and The Sea Wolf – were written by Rossen. Wallis was very pleased with Rossen's script in 1946 for The Strange Love of Martha Ivers, which was produced by Wallis own company. However, Rossen turned down Wallis's next two films. Both Wallis as producer and Rossen as writer-director wanted to operate as independents, rather than under the control of a studio.

All the King's Men was one of the later social "message" films as America turned conservative. Thomas Schatz regarded All the King's Men as possibly the best of the genre, as it examined alcoholism, adultery, political corruption and the influence of journalism. In 2001 the United States National Film Registry preserved the film as "culturally, historically, or aesthetically significant."

Rossen produced, directed and co-wrote The Hustler in 1961. At the time, Variety praised the cast, complained about the "sordid aspects" of the story and felt the film was far too long. The New Republic praised the cast and Rossen's "sure, economical" direction, but thought the script "strains hard to give an air of menace and criminality." The film won two Academy Awards and was nominated for another seven, was nominated in four of the Golden Globes' categories, and gained many other awards and nominations.

In 1997. the National Film Registry preserved The Hustler as "culturally, historically, or aesthetically significant." In 2002, Roger Ebert described the film as one "where scenes have such psychic weight that they grow in our memories" and praised Rossen's decision to develop all four main characters, and James Berardinelli listed the film in his All Time Top 100 for similar reasons. Ebert also praised Rossen's decision to shoot the film in the "stygian gloom of the billiard parlor" created by black-and-white. Other accolades appeared in the 2000s (decade).

Nina Leibman regarded Lilith as the most extreme of the American film industry's applications, or rather misapplications, of psychoanalytic concepts, as the patient is already psychotic and has a track record of previous conquests. In The New Biographical Dictionary of Film, David Thomson describes Lilith as "an oddity, the only one of [Rossen's] films that seems passionate, mysterious and truly personal. The other films will look increasingly dated and self-contained, but Lilith may grow."

== Preservation ==
The Academy Film Archive preserved several of Robert Rossen's films, including The Hustler, All the King's Men, and Lilith.

== Theater ==
=== Plays ===
Release	Title	Notes
1935	The Body Beautiful	director
1960	The Cool World	co-writer

=== Other theater work ===
Release	Title	Notes
1932	Steel	director
1932	The Tree	director
1933	Birthright	director

== Film ==
Year	Title	Director	Writer	Producer
1937	Marked Woman	No	Yes	No
1937	They Won't Forget	No	Yes	No
1938	Racket Busters	No	Yes	No
1939	Dust Be My Destiny	No	Yes	No
1939	The Roaring Twenties	No	Yes	No
1940	A Child Is Born	No	Yes	No
1941	The Sea Wolf	No	Yes	No
1941	Out of the Fog	No	Yes	No
1941	Blues in the Night	No	Yes	No
1943	Edge of Darkness	No	Yes	No
1945	A Walk in the Sun	No	Yes	No
1946	The Strange Love of Martha Ivers	No	Yes	No
1947	Johnny O'Clock	Yes	Yes	No
1947	Desert Fury	No	Yes	No
1947	Body and Soul	Yes	No	No
1949	The Undercover Man	No	No	Yes
1949	All the King's Men	Yes	Yes	Yes
1951	The Brave Bulls	Yes	No	Yes
1954	Mambo	Yes	Yes	No
1956	Alexander the Great	Yes	Yes	Yes
1957	Island in the Sun	Yes	No	No
1959	They Came to Cordura	Yes	Yes	No
1961	The Hustler	Yes	Yes	Yes
1964	Lilith	Yes	Yes	Yes

== See also ==
- List of Russian Academy Award winners and nominees

== Sources ==
- "101 Greatest Screenplays". Writers Guild of America West. Archived from the original on August 13, 2006.
- "A Walk in the Sun: Overview – AllMovie". Allmovie. Rovi Corporation.
- "A Walk in the Sun (1946)". Turner Classic Movies. Turner Sports and Entertainment Digital Network. Archived from the original on October 19, 2012.
- "Alexander the Great (1956)". Turner Classic Movies. Turner Sports and Entertainment Digital Network. Archived from the original on September 4, 2011.
- "Alexander the Great". allmovie.com. Rovi Corporation.
- Berardinelli, James (November 29, 2010). "Reelviews – All the King's Men". Reelviews.
- "All the King's Men (1950)". Turner Classic Movies. Turner Sports and Entertainment Digital Network. Archived from the original on October 29, 2020.
- "Blues in the Night (1941)". Turner Classic Movies. Turner Sports and Entertainment Digital Network. Archived from the original on November 2, 2012.
- "Body and Soul (1947)". Turner Classic Movies. Turner Sports and Entertainment Digital Network. Archived from the original on September 11, 2011.
- "The Brave Bulls (1951)". Turner Classic Movies. Turner Sports and Entertainment Digital Network. Archived from the original on October 22, 2012.
- "The Brave Bulls". allmovie.com. Rovi Corporation.
- Richard P. Krafsur, ed. (1997). The American Film Institute Catalog of Motion Pictures Produced in the United States: Feature Films, 1961–1970, Part 2. University of California Press. ISBN 978-0-520-20970-1.
- "Cool World (1964)". Turner Classic Movies. Turner Sports and Entertainment Digital Network. Archived from the original on November 29, 2010.
- "Dust Be My Destiny (1939)". Turner Classic Movies. Turner Sports and Entertainment Digital Network. Archived from the original on July 28, 2011.
- Deming, Mark. "Island in the Sun". allmovie.com. Rovi Corporation.
- "Island in the Sun (Production)". allmovie.com. Rovi Corporation.
- "The Hustler – Awards". allmovieguide.com. Rovi Corporation.
- "The Hustler (1961)". Turner Classic Movies. Turner Sports and Entertainment Digital Network. Archived from the original on August 11, 2011.
- Eric Bentley, ed. (1971). Thirty Years of Treason: Excerpts from Hearings before the House Committee on Un-American Activities, 1938–1968. New York: The Viking Press. ISBN 9780670701650.
- Cogley, John (1956). Report on Blacklisting I · Movies. Arno Press & The New York Times.
- "Desert Fury (1947)". Turner Classic Movies. Turner Sports and Entertainment Digital Network. Archived from the original on June 7, 2013.
- "The Fog(1)". Turner Classic Movies. Turner Sports and Entertainment Digital Network. Archived from the original on July 28, 2011.
- Dyer, R.A. (2003). Hustler Days: Minnesota Fats, Wimpy Lassiter, Jersey Red, and America's Great Age of Pool. New York: Muf Books. ISBN 1-56731-807-X.
- "Awards search – Robert Rossen". Hollywood Foreign Press Association. Archived from the original on 2009-12-15.
- "1949 Academy Awards". AMC filmsite. American Movie Classics Company LLC.
- "Lilith (1964)". Turner Classic Movies. Turner Sports and Entertainment Digital Network. Archived from the original on September 7, 2011.
- "Marked Woman (1937)". Turner Classic Movies. Turner Sports and Entertainment Digital Network. Archived from the original on September 15, 2011.
- "New York Film Critics Circle: 1961 Awards". New York Film Critics Circle. Archived from the original on May 7, 2006.
- Berardinelli, James (2002). "Hustler, The". ReelViews.
- Buhle, Paul; Wagner, Dave (2002). Radical Hollywood: The Untold Story Behind America's Favorite Movies. New York: The New Press. ISBN 1-56584-718-0.
- Casty, Alan (1966). "The Films of Robert Rossen". Film Quarterly. 20 (2): 3–12. doi:10.2307/1210689. JSTOR 1210689.
- Crowther, Bosley (April 21, 1949). "The Undercover Man (1949)". The New York Times.
- Crowther, Bosley (March 31, 1955). "'Mambo' Out of Step". The New York Times.
- Dick, Bernard F. (1993). "Harry's Hierarchy". The Merchant Prince of Poverty Row: Harry Cohn of Columbia Pictures. University Press of Kentucky. pp. 157–180. ISBN 0-8131-1841-7.
- Dick, Bernard F. (2004). "Interstellar Spaces". Hal Wallis: producer to the stars. Lexington, Kentucky: University Press of Kentucky. pp. 111–128. ISBN 0-8131-2317-8.
- Ebert, Roger (June 23, 2002). "The Hustler (1961)". Chicago Sun-Times. Archived from the original on September 23, 2012.
- Farber, Stephen (Autumn 1966). "New American Gothic". Film Quarterly. 20 (1). University of California Press: 22–27. doi:10.2307/1211159. JSTOR 1211159.
- Farber, Stephen (Winter 1974–1975). "The Vanishing Heroine". The Hudson Review. 27 (4). The Hudson Review, Inc.: 570–576. doi:10.2307/3850358. JSTOR 3850358.
- Fischer-Hornung, Dorothea (2001). "The Body Possessed: Katherine Dunham Dance Technique in Mambo". In Dorothea Fischer-Hornung, Alison D. Goeller (ed.). Embodying liberation: the Black body in American dance. Forum for European Contributions to African American Studies: FORECAAST. Vol. 4. Berlin-Hamburg-Münster: LIT Verlag. pp. 91–112. ISBN 3-8258-4473-0.
- "HFPA Awards Search: The Hustler". Hollywood Foreign Press Association.
- "Island in the Sun (1957)". Turner Classic Movies. Turner Sports and Entertainment Digital Network. Archived from the original on October 3, 2011.
- "Johnny O'Clock (1947)". Turner Classic Movies. Turner Sports and Entertainment Digital Network. Archived from the original on October 18, 2020.
- Kauffmann, Stanley (October 9, 1961). "The Talent of Paul Newman". The New Republic. p. 28.
- Leibman, Nina C. (Winter 1987). "Sexual Misdemeanor/Psychoanalytic Felony". Cinema Journal. 26 (2). University of Texas Press: 27–38. doi:10.2307/1225337. JSTOR 1225337.
- Mayer, Geoff (2007). "McCarthyism, the House on Un-American Activities, and the Caper Film". In Geoff Mayer and Brian McDonnell (ed.). Encyclopedia of film noir. Greenwood Publishing Group. pp. 62–69. ISBN 978-0-313-33306-4.
- "Mambo". allmovie.com. Rovi Corporation.
- "Mambo (1955)". Turner Classic Movies. Turner Sports and Entertainment Digital Network. Archived from the original on November 2, 2012.
- Millar, Daniel (1972). "The Method of Rossen's Late Films". Journal of American Studies. 6 (3): 309–316. doi:10.1017/s0021875800011890. JSTOR 27553014.
- "Racket Busters (1938)". Turner Classic Movies. Turner Sports and Entertainment Digital Network. Archived from the original on September 28, 2011.
- "The Roaring Twenties (1939)". Turner Classic Movies. Turner Sports and Entertainment Digital Network. Archived from the original on July 22, 2011.
- "The Sea Wolf (1941)". Turner Classic Movies. Turner Sports and Entertainment Digital Network. Archived from the original on November 26, 2011.
- "The Strange Love of Martha Ivers (1946)". Turner Classic Movies. Turner Sports and Entertainment Digital Network. Archived from the original on October 1, 2012.
- "They Won't Forget (1937)". Turner Classic Movies. Turner Sports and Entertainment Digital Network. Archived from the original on October 18, 2020.
- "National Film Registry, 2001". The Library of Congress Information Bulletin. Library of Congress. December 18, 2001. Archived from the original on September 23, 2009.
- "New to the National Film Registry". Library of Congress. December 1997.
- Neve, Brian (1992). "Into the Fifties". Film and politics in America: a social tradition. Routledge. pp. 170–171. ISBN 0-415-02619-9.
- Neve, Brian (2005). "The Hollywood Left: Robert Rossen and Postwar Hollywood" (PDF). Film Studies. 7: 54–65. doi:10.7227/FS.7.7. Archived from the original (PDF) on May 12, 2011.
- Weiler, A.H. (March 29, 1956). "Alexander the Great (1956)". The New York Times.
- Nugent, Frank S. (October 7, 1939). "Eternally Yours (1939) – Movie Review". The New York Times.
- Nugent, Frank S. (November 11, 1939). "The Roaring Twenties (1939) – Movie Review". The New York Times.
- Nugent, Frank S. (January 11, 1940). "A Child Is Born (1940) – Movie Review". The New York Times.
- "Paid Notice: Deaths: Rossen, Stephen, M." The New York Times. April 19, 2007.
- Brennan, Sandra (2012). "Robert Rossen – Biography". Movies & TV Dept. The New York Times. Archived from the original on October 26, 2012.
- "Rossen, Director of Many Movie Masterpieces, Dies". UPI. February 19, 1966.
- Sadoul, Georges; Peter Morris (1972). "Lilith". Dictionary of films. University of California Press. p. 193. ISBN 0-520-02152-5. "lilith rossen."
- Schatz, Thomas (1999). Boom and bust: American cinema in the 1940s. History of the American cinema. Vol. 6. University of California Press. ISBN 0-520-22130-3.
- "The Hustler – Awards". Allmovie.com. Rovi Corporation.
- Crowther, Bosley (April 19, 1951). "The Brave Bulls (1951)". The New York Times.
- T.M.P (December 12, 1941). "Blues in the Night (1941) – Movie Review". The New York Times.
- Tatara, Paul. "Alexander the Great". Turner Classic Movies. Time Warner Company.
- LoBianco, Lorraine. "Directed by Robert Rossen". Turner Classic Movies. A Time Warner Company.
- "They Came to Cordura (1959)". Turner Classic Movies. Turner Sports and Entertainment Digital Network. Archived from the original on July 28, 2011.
- Thomas, Bob (March 11, 1966). "Robert Rossen Thought About Impending Death". Ada (Oklahoma) Evening News. Associated Press. p. 11.
- Thomson, David (2002). The New Biographical Dictionary of Film. London: Little, Brown.
- "Top 10 Sports Films". American Film Institute. 2008.
- "The Undercover Man". Variety. Reed Elsevier Inc. January 1, 1949.
- Variety staff (January 1, 1961). "The Hustler". Variety. Reed Elsevier Inc.
- "The Undercover Man (1949)". Turner Classic Movies. Turner Sports and Entertainment Digital Network. Archived from the original on July 22, 2011.
- "Weddings; Ellen Rossen, Av Westin". The New York Times. October 25, 1992.
- Williams, Tony (1998). "From Novel to Film". In Rocco Fumento, Tony Williams (ed.). Jack London's The Sea Wolf: A Screenplay by Robert Rossen. SIU Press. pp. xvii–xxvi. ISBN 0-8093-2176-9.
