= Minnesota Fats =

Minnesota Fats may refer to:

- Rudolf Wanderone (1913–1996), commonly known as Minnesota Fats, an American professional pool player
- Minnesota Fats (character), or George Hegerman, a fictional pool hustler created by American novelist Walter Tevis
