= Johnny O'Clock =

1947 film by Robert Rossen

- Theatrical release poster
- Directed by: Robert Rossen
- Screenplay by: Robert Rossen
- Story by: Milton Holmes
- Produced by: Edward G. Nealis
- Starring: Dick Powell; Evelyn Keyes; Lee J. Cobb; Ellen Drew
- Cinematography: Burnett Guffey
- Edited by: Al Clark; Warren Low
- Music by: George Duning
- Color process: Black and white
- Production company: J.E.M. Productions
- Distributed by: Columbia Pictures
- Release date: January 21, 1947
- Running time: 96 minutes
- Country: United States
- Language: English
- Budget: more than $1 million
- Box office: $1,750,000

Johnny O'Clock is a 1947 American film noir crime film directed by Robert Rossen and starring Dick Powell, Evelyn Keyes, Lee J. Cobb and Ellen Drew. It was distributed by Columbia Pictures.

== Plot ==
Johnny O'Clock is a junior partner in an upmarket casino with Guido Marchettis. Complicating their longtime working relationship is Guido's wife Nelle, who is still in love with former boyfriend Johnny. She gives Johnny an expensive custom pocket watch, the twin of a birthday present she gave her husband, except Johnny's has a romantic inscription engraved on the back.

Johnny gives Harriet Hobson, a hat-check girl at the casino, the watch and a rejection note to return to Nelle. However, Harriet apparently commits suicide using gas. Her sister Nancy shows up wanting to find out what happened to cause her sister to kill herself. She becomes attracted to Johnny. They eventually learn from Police Inspector Koch that Harriet was killed by poison.

Harriet was dating Chuck Blayden, a crooked cop who is trying to persuade Guido to let him take Johnny's place. When Blayden also turns up dead, Koch suspects that either Johnny or Guido is responsible.

Though Johnny tries to resist, little by little, he falls for Nancy. When Koch shows both Johnny and Guido Johnny's watch and note, Johnny abruptly tells Nancy their relationship is over and takes her to the airport. As he is driving away, he narrowly survives a drive-by shooting, and Nancy realizes he was only trying to protect her. She refuses to leave him.

Johnny decides that he and Nancy will flee to South America, but not before brazenly cashing in his share of the casino. Guido pulls out a gun when Johnny's back is turned. They shoot it out; Guido is killed and Johnny wounded. Afterward, Nelle offers to testify it was self-defense, but only if he will come back to her. He refuses, so she tells Koch it was cold-blooded murder. Johnny tells Koch it was indeed self-defense but he knows he will not be believed. Koch suggests that if it s the truth, it will be believed and Nancy eventually convinces Johnny to give himself up.

== Cast ==
- Dick Powell as Johnny O'Clock
- Evelyn Keyes as Nancy Hobson
- Lee J. Cobb as Inspector Koch
- Ellen Drew as Nelle Marchettis
- Nina Foch as Harriet Hobson
- Thomas Gomez as Guido Marchettis (as S. Thomas Gomez)
- John Kellogg as Charlie
- Jim Bannon as Chuck Blayden
- Mabel Paige as slatternly woman tenant
- Phil Brown as Phil, hotel clerk
- Jeff Chandler as Turk (uncredited)
- Robin Raymond as hatcheck girl (uncredited)

== Production ==
The film was based on an original story by Milton Holmes. Rights were bought by Columbia, who originally tried to assign the project to Charles Vidor who refused (something which later came up when Vidor sued Columbia). Evelyn Keyes was given the female lead. Lee J. Cobb was borrowed from 20th Century Fox to play a support role. Thomas Gomez was borrowed from Universal.

Dick Powell acted on radio with Jeff Chandler and was impressed by the young actor. Chandler later recalled, "It was Dick who took me to Columbia and told everybody who would listen, 'This kid ought to be in pictures.' One executive finally kinda gave him a look which said: 'All right you –– ––, we'll put him in yours.' And that's how I came to play a gambler in a card playing sequence."

Filming started 10 July 1946.

== Critical reception ==
Kine Weekly said "The robust 'crooks fall out' is peopled with a colourful assortment of vital and arresting characters, and these, skilfully manipulated by author and director, enable the film to tread water effectively. It is only towards the finish that it begins to falter, but the slap-up finale rescues it from the 'red'. Excellently staged and smartly dialogued, it will have no great difficulty in living down its incredibly unattractive title."

Monthly Film Bulletin said "The film moves at a fast pace, the dialogue is slick and characterisations generally effective. Dick Powell and Evelyn Keyes head the cast expertly, while the detective is played with considerable aplomb by that individual personality, Lee J. Cobb."

Richard Brody from The New Yorker noted "This terse and taut film noir is centered on the romantic and professional conflicts of the title character, the criminal mastermind (played by Dick Powell) behind a posh illegal casino. The film's writer and director, Robert Rossen, sets up a multidimensional chess game, for mortal stakes, between Johnny, his boss (Thomas Gomez), his boss's wife (Ellen Drew), a cagey police inspector (Lee J. Cobb), and a scuffling actress (Evelyn Keyes) whose sister (Nina Foch) worked at the casino and dated a corrupt detective (Jim Bannon). The caustically epigrammatic script, the cast's suavely controlled gestures of love and menace, and Rossen's thrillingly restrained and stylishly assertive images (as well as his political conscience) make this pugnacious yet intricate spectacle a hidden classic of the genre."

Variety gave the film kudos, writing, "This is a smart whodunit, with attention to scripting, casting and camerawork lifting it above the average. Pic has action and suspense, and certain quick touches of humor to add flavor. Ace performances by Dick Powell, as a gambling house overseer, and Lee J. Cobb, as a police inspector, also up the rating ... Although the plot follows a familiar pattern, the characterizations are fresh and the performances good enough to overbalance. Dialog is terse and topical, avoiding the sentimental, phoney touch. Unusual camera angles come along now and then to heighten interest and momentarily arrest the eye. Strong teamplay by Robert Rossen, doubling as director-scripter, and Milton Holmes, original writer and associate producer, also aids in making this a smooth production."

Film critic Bosley Crowther gave the film a mixed review, criticizing it for slow pacing, writing, "But the slowness and general confusion of the plot for two-thirds of the film does not make for notable excitement, and the shallowness of the mystery as to who's doing all the killing relieves it of any great suspense. It is mainly a matter of watching Mr. Powell go through his paces stylishly while a large cast of actors and actresses give him customary support. Evelyn Keyes plays the good little lady who brings out the best in him and Ellen Drew is the sleek and slinky vixen who gets him into jams. Thomas Gomez is oily as the villain and Lee J. Cobb does another able tour as a weary police inspector who finally closes the case. A great deal of drinking and smoking is done by all concerned."

Philp French, writing in The Observer said: "This rarely shown film noir is the cool, controlled directorial debut of the left-wing writer who went on to make such classics as All the King's Men [1949] and The Hustler [1961]."
