= Eddie Parker (pool player) =

American pool player (c.1932–2001)

"Fast Eddie" Parker (c. 1932, Springfield, Missouri – February 2, 2001, Brownsville, Texas) was an American pool player, claimed by many to have been the inspiration for the character "Fast Eddie" Felson in the 1959 Walter Tevis novel The Hustler. In both the 1961 film adaptation and the 1986 sequel, Felson was played by Paul Newman who earned Oscar nominations for both performances, winning the Academy Award for Best Actor for the latter.

Parker started playing pool at the age of nine when his father, a school superintendent, bought a used pool table. In high school, he acquired the nickname "Fast Eddie" for his speed in football and basketball.

In Kansas City, he met six-time world champion Bennie Allen, who became the teenager's mentor. Parker later said, "I never had any idea I was going to turn professional and shoot for money until I started studying with Benny Allen." He made a living from the game, but did not get rich. According to him, his biggest win was $30,000 playing three-cushion billiards sometime in the 1950s, but his backer got $18,000 of that.

During his travels, in Louisville he befriended Walter Tevis, then a young man working his way through college. Parker stated, "When the [1961] movie came out, I didn't want to be associated with it. The movie would've blown my cover by the time I got to the next town." However, Tevis maintained that "Fast Eddie" and "Minnesota Fats" were fictitious, and he resented assertions that he had "created such memorable characters out of mere reportage". After his death in 1984, his widow debunked claims for years that the Fast Eddie character was based on a real person.

Parker retired either in the early 1970s or in 1980.

He died in 2001 at age 69 of a heart attack while attending the US Classic Billiards Eight-Ball Showdown tournament near Brownsville, Texas. He was survived by his wife of 50 years, and two children.
