= The Color of Money (novel) =

1984 novel by Walter Tevis

- Author: Walter Tevis
- Language: English
- Genre: Fiction
- Publication date: 1984
- Publication place: United States

The Color of Money is a 1984 novel by American novelist Walter Tevis. It is the sequel to his 1959 novel, The Hustler. It was his sixth and final book before his death in the year of publication.

== Synopsis ==
The novel is set in 1983, which is described in this book as twenty-two years after Fast Eddie defeated Minnesota Fats in Chicago. Eddie, now 50, runs a pool hall of his own in Lexington, Kentucky. He is long married but getting a divorce, and his ex-wife has gained possession of the pool room, and she is selling off its tables. Eddie has not played pool in many years, even though Burt Gordon, the gambler who had threatened him if he continued playing professionally, is long dead.

After being approached by a cable television production company to engage in a series of exhibition matches with Fats, he meets his old nemesis in the Florida Keys. Fats, now in his late sixties, is in poor health, but he is financially independent and spends his days photographing birds and fishing. Eddie persuades Fats to appear with him in the matches. Fats is reluctant to do so but agrees to do them for a higher fee. To win Fats's participation, Eddie agrees to give him a portion of his split of the fee. They go on tour, with Eddie getting advice from Fats along the way. Fats beats him in every match.

Eddie meets Arabella, an English woman, who moves in with him. With her encouragement, Eddie resumes playing pool, mostly nine-ball. He gains experience and confidence but struggles to overcome his years of inactivity and his experience with the techniques of straight pool, which is far different. Fats gives Eddie a list of small town pool rooms where he believes Eddie can win money. Eddie goes from town to town, challenging the best player in each poolroom. He wins, but winds up being cheated and beaten at one of them. He is continuing his exhibition matches with Fats, getting better. Fats dies just before their last match.

Eddie gets discouraged after the beating and obtains employment with a university, running a student recreation area that includes a pool hall. He hates the job, so with Arabella's help he sets up a store that sells folk art. The store begins promisingly but is the target of a malicious local youth who had made sexual advances to Arabella. He sets fire to the store and meticulously destroys everything in it.

Eddie participates in a nine-ball championship in Lake Tahoe. He wins, beating a number of younger players.

== Critical reaction ==
Publishers Weekly called the book "taut and evocative", and the Chicago Tribune said that "Tevis has added some of the glamor, but the grit remains."

The Washington Post called the novel a "very fine book", and said that from the beginning, "the staccato beat of the prose and finely drawn characters grab the reader and don't let go". The Post opined that "Tevis writes about pool with power and poetry and tension. He infuses the sport with the same kind of crowd excitement surrounding a fine horse race or football game. You don't have to like pool to like this book, to appreciate its sense of living on the edge."

In the Lexington Herald-Leader, reviewer Rick Bailey wrote: "Once more, as he did years ago, Tevis lays it on the line. Once more, he delivers."

== Film adaptation ==
The novel was adapted into a 1986 drama film directed by Martin Scorsese from a screenplay by Richard Price, based on Tevis' novel. The film differs greatly from the novel in terms of plot, and does not feature the Minnesota Fats character. Although Tevis did author a screenplay for the film, having adapted the storyline directly from his novel, the filmmakers decided not to use it, instead crafting an entirely different story under Tevis' title. Except for the Felson character, none of the characters in the novel appear in the film, and except for him the characters in the film are not in the novel.

The film stars Paul Newman and Tom Cruise, with Mary Elizabeth Mastrantonio, Helen Shaver, and John Turturro. The film featured an original score by Robbie Robertson.
