= Minnesota Fats (character) =

Fictional character

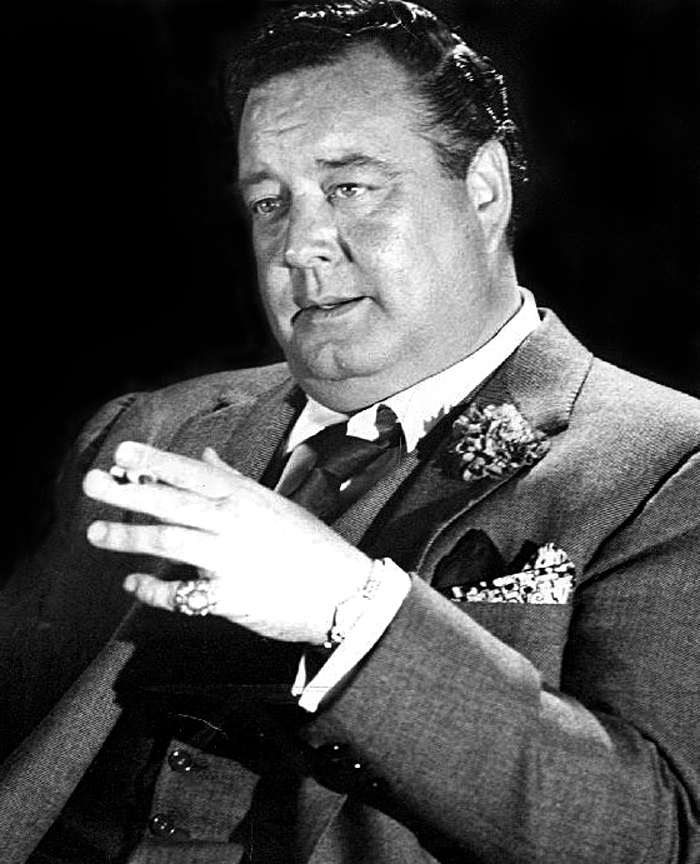
Jackie Gleason as Fats in The Hustler (1961)

Minnesota Fats, or George Hegerman, is a fictional pool hustler created by American novelist Walter Tevis.

The character appears in Tevis' novel The Hustler (1959) as the secondary antagonist. Jackie Gleason portrayed him in the 1961 film adaptation of The Hustler. Though a real pool hustler, Rudolf Wanderone, who began calling himself "Minnesota Fats" in 1961, claimed to be the inspiration, Tevis denied that claim and insisted that Minnesota Fats was fictional.

== Film ==
Jackie Gleason played Minnesota Fats in the 1961 adaptation of The Hustler. His performance earned Best Supporting Actor nominations for the Academy Award and the Golden Globe, and the Best Supporting Actor award by the National Board of Review of Motion Pictures. Although Minnesota Fats was a secondary character in the Color of Money novel, he did not appear in the 1986 film of that name, which had an entirely different storyline from the novel.

== Wanderone ==
Real-life pool hustler and entertainer Rudolf Wanderone was known as "New York Fats" (among other nicknames) when the book was published. Realizing there was money to be made from being associated with the success of the book and subsequent film, he changed his nickname to match the fictional name and later went on to play himself as the character "Minnesota Fats" in the film The Player (1971). Tevis consistently denied that Wanderone had anything to do with the author's character, writing in a subsequent printing of The Hustler: "I made up Minnesota Fats—name and all—as surely as Disney made up Donald Duck." However, upon examining the novel's original manuscript, competitive pool player Derek Kirunchyk (an employee of Eastern Kentucky University, to which Tevis had donated it) discovered that Tevis had originally given the character the nickname "New York", then struck this through and replaced it with "Minnesota", lending credence to Fats' claim that he was the inspiration for the character; journalist and billiards historian R. A. Dyer subsequently examined the manuscript as well and discovered that Tevis had done this multiple times.

Wanderone's association with the name started in 1961. That year, while at a drive-in movie theater owned by a friend of Wanderone's (George Jansco), in Johnston City, Illinois, showing The Hustler, Wanderone boasted that the author had based the character upon him, a story which was picked up by local news and subsequently by the national press outlets. Willie Mosconi – famed as the 19-time winner of the World Straight Pool Championship and technical adviser for The Hustler – disputed the claim, which had the paradoxical effect of giving it more notoriety. Wanderone capitalized on this, threatening to sue Tevis and 20th Century Fox. Tevis responded by denying he had ever met Wanderone. Meanwhile, the press covered it all, and the association became fixed. Wanderone's second wife later claimed that a financial settlement had been made by Tevis to avoid a lawsuit, which Wanderone's first wife denied.

== See also ==
- Minnesota Fats: Pool Legend, a 1995 Sega Genesis and Sega Saturn video game
