= Hustling =

Social practice

Hustling is the deceptive act of disguising one's skill in a sport or game with the intent of luring someone of probably lesser skill into gambling (or gambling for higher than current stakes) with the hustler, as a form of both a confidence trick and match fixing. It is most commonly associated with, and originated in pocket billiards (pool), but also can be performed with regard to other sports and gambling activities. Hustlers may also engage in "sharking"—distracting, disheartening, enraging, or even threatening their opponents—to throw them off. Hustlers are thus often called "pool sharks". Professional and semi-pro hustlers sometimes work with a "stakehorse"—a person who provides the money for the hustler to bet with (and who may assist in the hustling)—in exchange for a substantial portion of all winnings. Another form of hustling (often engaged in by the same hustlers who use the skill-disguising technique) is challenging "marks" (swindle targets) to bet on trick shots that seem nearly impossible but at which the hustler is exceptionally skilled. Chess hustlers are quite common in urban areas in the United States and elsewhere, often offering speed chess against any takers. Unlike most hustlers, chess hustlers are often assumed to be skilled and are seen as a challenge.

== Pool hustling techniques ==
Pool hustlers use deception and misdirection in order to win cash from inexperienced players (or skilled players inexperienced with the world of hustling). A skilled hustler:

- will usually play with a low-quality "house" cue stick provided by the pool hall, or an unadorned but high-quality personal cue that looks like one, known as a "sneaky pete" (or, with the nascence of local competitive league play in recent years, may play with a flashy-looking but evidently low-end personal cue, to give the impression that the hustler is a beginning league player);
- will typically play a game or two for "fun" or for low bets (a beer or equivalent amount of cash, for example) in order to check out the opponent and give the impression that money can easily be won, often losing on purpose (known as "sandbagging" or "dumping") – with the intent of winning a much larger wager later against a predictably overconfident opponent;
- will pocket some difficult and impressive shots or make surprisingly secure safety shots (ones crucial for winning), while missing many simple ones, thus making early victories appear to be sheer luck (a variant being the theatrical almost-making of shots that inexperienced players may think of as crucial mistakes, but which really give away very little advantage);
- may pretend to be intoxicated, unintelligent, or otherwise impaired (that is, until it is time to run the table or make a game-winning shot).
- when betting on trick shots, may intentionally miss the first or several times and lose a small amount, then raise the bet to an amount well beyond the loss and succeed at the well-practiced feat.

Many of these ploys can easily be mistaken for the honest faults of a less-than-exceptional player. The engendered doubt and uncertainty is what allows hustling to succeed, with the "faults" being dropped when a significant amount of money is at stake.

== In popular culture ==
Pool hustling is the subject of numerous works of popular culture. In Damon Runyon's short stories "Dream Street Rose" (More Than Somewhat, 1937) and "Madame La Gimp" (Furthermore, 1938), the fictional characters Frank and Judge Henry G. Blake respectively are pool hustlers. Other examples include films such as The Hustler (1961) and The Color of Money (1986) (both adapted from earlier novels, see "Books", below), among others (see "Films", below). An examplar in music is Jim Croce's 1972 song "You Don't Mess Around with Jim", in which the character Slim teaches a lesson to Big Jim about pool hustling. Pool hustling is also the principal subject of episodes of various television programs, including The Dick Van Dyke Show episode "Hustling the Hustler" (season 2, episode 5, 1962), the Quantum Leap episode "Pool Hall Blues" (sn. 2, ep. 18, 1990), The Fresh Prince of Bel-Air episode "Banks Shot" (sn. 1, ep. 22, 1991), The Steve Harvey Show episodes "Pool Sharks Git Bit" (sn. 1, ep. 12, 1996) followed up with "What You Won't Cue for Love" (sn. 3, ep. 6, 1998), and the Drake & Josh episode "Pool Shark" (sn. 2, ep. 5, 2004). Additionally, the main characters of the TV series Supernatural, Dean and Sam Winchester, are also pool hustlers as one of their sources of income (various episodes, 2005–2020).

== Notable real-life hustlers ==
- Danny "Kid Delicious" Basavich, former hustler turned top-ranking pool professional
- Billy "Cornbread Red" Burge, pool player from Detroit
- Keith McCready, a notorious pool hustler
- Efren Reyes, a Filipino pool player who hustled in the United States under the fake name "Cesar Morales" in the 1980s. Later won many international pool tournaments, and by acclamation considered to be the best pool player of all-time
- Alvin Clarence "Titanic Thompson" Thomas, a gambler, golfer, and hustler, from Arkansas
- Rudolf "Minnesota Fats" Wanderone, famous pool hustler and entertainer
- Jimmy "Pretty Boy Floyd" Mataya, actor
- Marty Reisman, former hustler turned top-ranking table tennis player and author
- Claude Bloodgood, a controversial American chess player and hustler who was later convicted of murdering his mother

== Notable books about and/or by hustlers ==
- Byrne, Robert; McGoorty, Danny. McGoorty: A Billiard Hustler's Life, also published as McGoorty: A Pool Room Hustler. (nonfiction; published in 1984/2003)
- Dyer, R.A. Dyer (2003). Hustler Days: Minnesota Fats, Wimpy Lassiter, Jersey Red, and America's Great Age of Pool. ISBN 1-59228-104-4. (nonfiction)
- Henning, Bob (1995). Cornbread Red: Pool's Greatest Money Player. ISBN 1-887956-34-4. (biography)
- Kennedy, William J. (1978). Billy Phelan's Greatest Game. ISBN 0-670-16667-7. (novel)
- LeBlanc, Robert "Cotton" (2010). Confessions of a Pool Hustler. ISBN 978-0-9823350-5-5. (autobiography)
- McCumber, David (1996). Playing off the Rail: A Pool Hustler's Journey. ISBN 0-679-42374-5. (non-fiction)
- Tevis, Walter (1959). The Hustler. ISBN 0-380-00860-2. (a novel)
- Tevis, Walter (1984). The Color of Money. ISBN 0-446-32353-5. (the sequel)

In a similar vein, but about other sports

- Reisman, Marty (1974). The Money Player: The Confessions of America's Greatest Table Tennis Champion and Hustler. ISBN 0-688-00273-0. (autobiography)

== Notable films about hustlers and hustling ==
- The Hustler (1961)
- The Color of Money (1986)
- Stickmen (2001)
- Poolhall Junkies (2003)
- Turn the River (2007; unusual in that it features a woman hustler)

In a similar vein, but about other sports:

- White Men Can't Jump (1992) – about basketball hustling
- Searching for Bobby Fischer (1993) – film about chess and hustlers in chess
- Kingpin (1996) – comedy about a bowling hustler
- Duets (2000) – features a karaoke bar hustler
- Striker (2010) – Bollywood drama about hustling in carrom, a billiards-related table game
- Marty Supreme (2025) – the titular character is a table tennis hustler

== Notable fictional hustlers ==
- "Cue Ball' Carl" (played by Ving Rhames) and "Jericho Hudson" (played by Freddie Prinze, Jr.) in Shooting Gallery
- "Johnny Doyle" (played by Mars Callahan) and "Brad" (played by Ricky Schroder) in Poolhall Junkies.
- "Minnesota Fats" in The Hustler (played by Jackie Gleason in the film version) – the smooth character whose moniker Rudolf Wanderone (above) lifted after publication of Tevis's novel
- "Edward 'Fast Eddie' Felson" in The Hustler and The Color of Money (played by Paul Newman in the film versions)
- "Vincent (Vince) Lauria" in The Color of Money (played by Tom Cruise in the film version)
- "Grady Seasons", said to be "the best money player in the world", in The Color of Money (played by Keith McCready, above, in the film version)
- "Charlie 'Black Magic' Walters" (played by Robert "Rags" Woods & Scott Bakula) in the Emmy Award-winning Quantum Leap episode "Pool Hall Blues"

== See also ==
- Advantage player § Comp hustling
