= The Color of Money =

1986 drama film by Martin Scorsese

- Theatrical release poster by Robert Tanenbaum
- Directed by: Martin Scorsese
- Screenplay by: Richard Price
- Based on: The Color of Money by Walter Tevis
- Produced by: Irving Axelrad; Barbara De Fina
- Starring: Paul Newman; Tom Cruise; Mary Elizabeth Mastrantonio; Helen Shaver
- Cinematography: Michael Ballhaus
- Edited by: Thelma Schoonmaker
- Music by: Robbie Robertson
- Production companies: Touchstone Pictures; Silver Screen Partners II
- Distributed by: Buena Vista Distribution Co.
- Release date: October 17, 1986 (U.S.)
- Running time: 119 minutes
- Country: United States
- Languages: English; Spanish
- Budget: $14.5 million
- Box office: $52.2 million

The Color of Money is a 1986 American sports drama film directed by Martin Scorsese. It is the sequel to the 1961 film The Hustler. Like the previous film, The Color of Money is based on a novel by Walter Tevis.

The film stars Paul Newman reprising his role as "Fast Eddie" Felson, for which he won the Academy Award for Best Actor. The film also stars Tom Cruise playing a pool hustler, and features Mary Elizabeth Mastrantonio as the girlfriend of Cruise's character. The plot follows the trio as they hustle pool halls and make their way to a nine-ball tournament in Atlantic City. The Color of Money was released by Buena Vista Distribution Co. on October 17, 1986. It received positive reviews from critics, though some considered it inferior as a sequel to The Hustler.

As of 2026, Newman is the last actor from the Golden Age of Hollywood (1920s-1960s) to win an Academy Award for Best Actor as he did in 1987 for his performance in this film.

== Plot ==
Former pro-pool player "Fast Eddie" Felson has given up the game and is now a successful liquor salesman in Chicago. However, he partners with pool players, including a hustler named Julian, who is outmatched at nine-ball by the young and charismatic Vincent Lauria. Recognizing Vincent's skill, and his girlfriend Carmen's inexperience at luring players to lose money, Eddie tells the couple of their excellent potential for hustling.

Carmen visits Eddie alone to inquire about his interest in Vincent. Finding him working at Child World, Eddie invites Vincent to leave the next day for six weeks of hustling on the road, culminating in a nine-ball tournament in Atlantic City. Manipulating Vincent's insecurities about Carmen and giving him a valuable Balabushka cue stick, Eddie persuades him to accept his offer. Eddie's abrupt departure upsets Julian, as well as Eddie's girlfriend, Janelle.

Vincent and Carmen hit the road with Eddie in his Cadillac, visiting a series of pool halls, with Eddie taking most of any winnings and absorbing losses. Eddie attempts to teach him the art of hustling, but Vincent balks at having to play below his ability. While at a pool hall run by his old acquaintance, Orvis, Eddie becomes fed up with Vincent's arrogance, and leaves him. In Vincent's absence, Eddie reminds Carmen that they are partners with a mutual business interest in Vincent. Eddie returns to find Vincent grandstanding, beating the pool hall's best player but scaring off a wealthier mark. Eddie and Vincent talk frankly, agreeing that Vincent must curb his ego if they are to succeed.

Eddie and Carmen struggle to rein in Vincent's showboating. After a string of successful games, Vincent plays the famed Grady Seasons, but is directed by Eddie to dump the game to inflate the odds against Vincent in Atlantic City. Goaded by Grady, Vincent nearly fails to throw the game, and Eddie is inspired to play again. After some success, Eddie is beaten by Amos, a hustler. Humiliated, Eddie leaves Vincent and Carmen with enough money to make it to Atlantic City.

Eddie enters the Atlantic City tournament, in which he triumphs against Vincent. Vincent surprises Eddie in his room and explains that, after boosting his odds by beating Grady, he bet on Eddie and dumped their match. Before leaving, Vincent and Carmen give Eddie $8,000, his "cut" of their winnings.

In his semifinal match, Eddie forfeits the game and returns Vincent's money. Determined to win legitimately, Eddie faces Vincent in a private match, declaring, "I'm back!"

== Cast ==
- Paul Newman as Eddie "Fast Eddie" Felson
- Tom Cruise as Vincent Lauria
- Mary Elizabeth Mastrantonio as Carmen
- Helen Shaver as Janelle
- John Turturro as Julian
- Bill Cobbs as Orvis
- Forest Whitaker as Amos
- Keith McCready as Grady
- Iggy Pop as Skinny Player on Road
- Elizabeth Bracco as Diane at Bar
- Bruce A. Young as Moselle
- Steve Mizerak as Duke, Eddie's First Opponent
- Paul Herman as Player in Casino Bar
- Ron Dean as Guy in Crowd

== Production ==
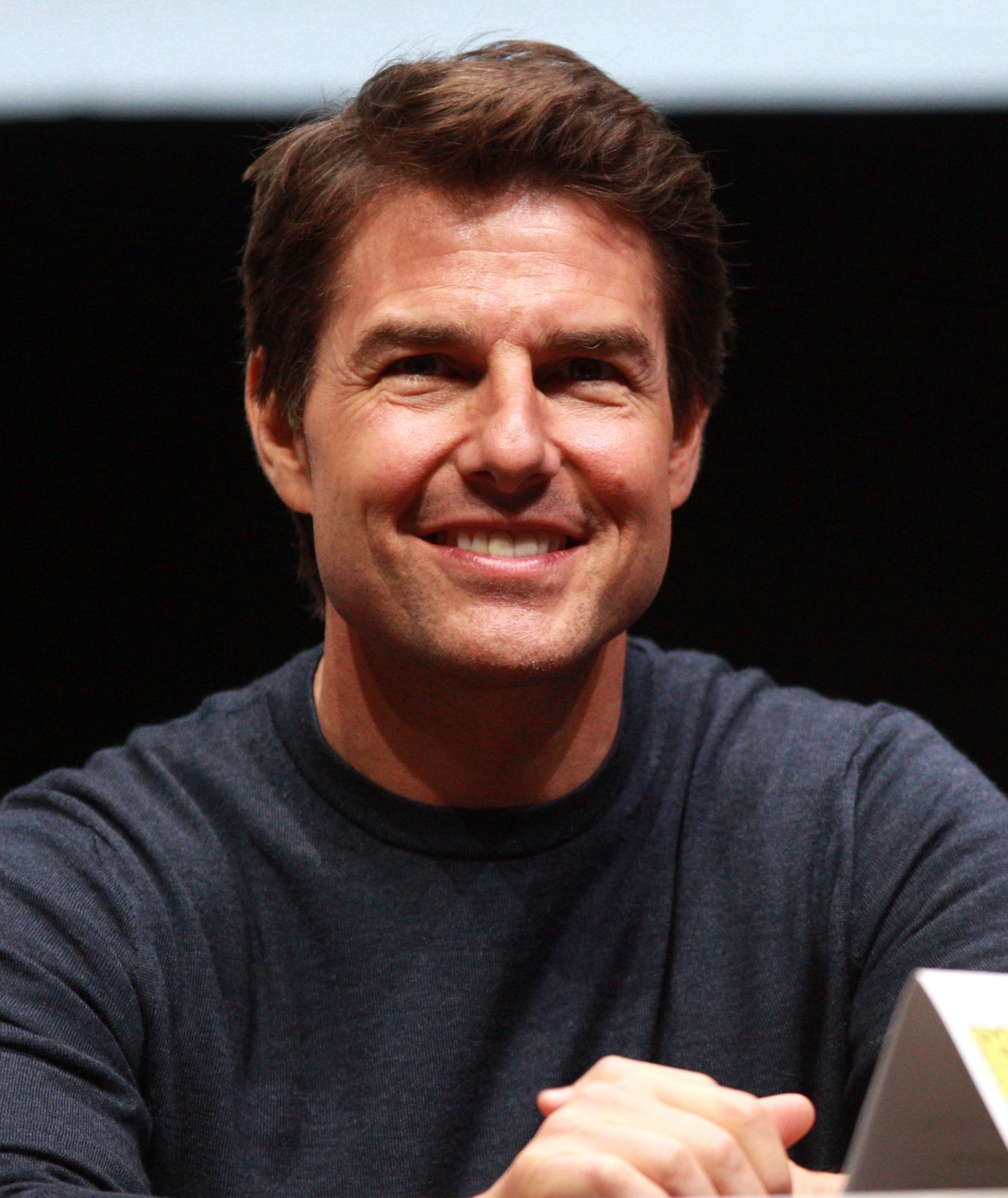
To perform his own pool shots, Tom Cruise practiced for hours on end.

Paul Newman called Martin Scorsese in September 1984 and asked him if he was interested in directing a sequel to The Hustler. The original screenplay sent to Scorsese was written by Darryl Ponicsan and it "incorporated the first twelve minutes of the original film" according to Scorsese. Walter Tevis wrote a sequel to his novel The Hustler, called The Color of Money, and died the same day producer Irving Axelrad received galley proofs of the book.

Scorsese shot the film in 49 days at a cost of $14.5 million, $1.5 million under budget. Michael Ballhaus was the cinematographer for the film. The Color of Money was released by Touchstone Pictures, after both 20th Century Fox and Columbia Pictures declined. Richard Price adapted Tevis's novel. Although it features some characters from the novel, it was not written to be a sequel. A screenplay was written by Tevis, but the filmmakers decided not to use it. Jean-Pierre Léaud was briefly considered for the role of Vincent. It was shot in and around Chicago, with much of the filming taking place in pool and billiard halls, rather than in built sets, including FitzGerald's Nightclub. The film was edited by Thelma Schoonmaker, who used closeup shots of pool balls being played, as well as wider visuals of the players, to get across the visual of a pool hall.

Scorsese considered shooting the film in black and white. He cited the influence of techniques and lighting in the 1947 Powell-Pressburger film, Black Narcissus, when making The Color of Money. In particular, he stated that the extreme closeups of Tom Cruise around the pool table were inspired by those of the nuns in that film.

Newman said that the best advice he was given by Scorsese was to "try not to be funny". Cruise performed most of his own pool shots. An exception was a jump shot over two balls to pot another. Scorsese believed that Cruise could learn the shot, but that it would take too long, so the shot was performed for him by professional player, Mike Sigel. Cruise mentioned that, to prepare for the role, he bought a pool table for his apartment and practiced for hours on end. Standing in for the valuable Balabushka cue in the movie is a Joss J-18 (which became the Joss 10-N7), made to resemble a classic Balabushka.

Sigel was a technical director, and he and fellow player, Ewa Mataya Laurance, served as technical consultants and shot performers in the film. Absent from the film is the character Minnesota Fats, played by Jackie Gleason in The Hustler. Newman said that he had wanted the character to appear, but that none of the attempts to include him fit well into the story that was being written. According to Scorsese, Gleason apparently agreed with Newman's opinion that Minnesota Fats was not essential to the film's story. Scorsese said that Gleason was presented with a draft of the script that had Fats worked into the narrative, but after reading it, Gleason declined to reprise the role because he felt that the character seemed to have been added as "an afterthought".

== Release ==
The Color of Money had its world premiere at the Ziegfeld Theater in New York City October 8, 1986. The film went into wide release in the United States October 17, 1986. The American release was limited to select theaters throughout the country, with the film opening in more theaters during the next four weeks of its initial release. After its run, the film grossed $52,293,982 domestically. The film was released on DVD January 3, 2000, and on Blu-ray June 5, 2012.

== Reception ==
=== Critical response ===
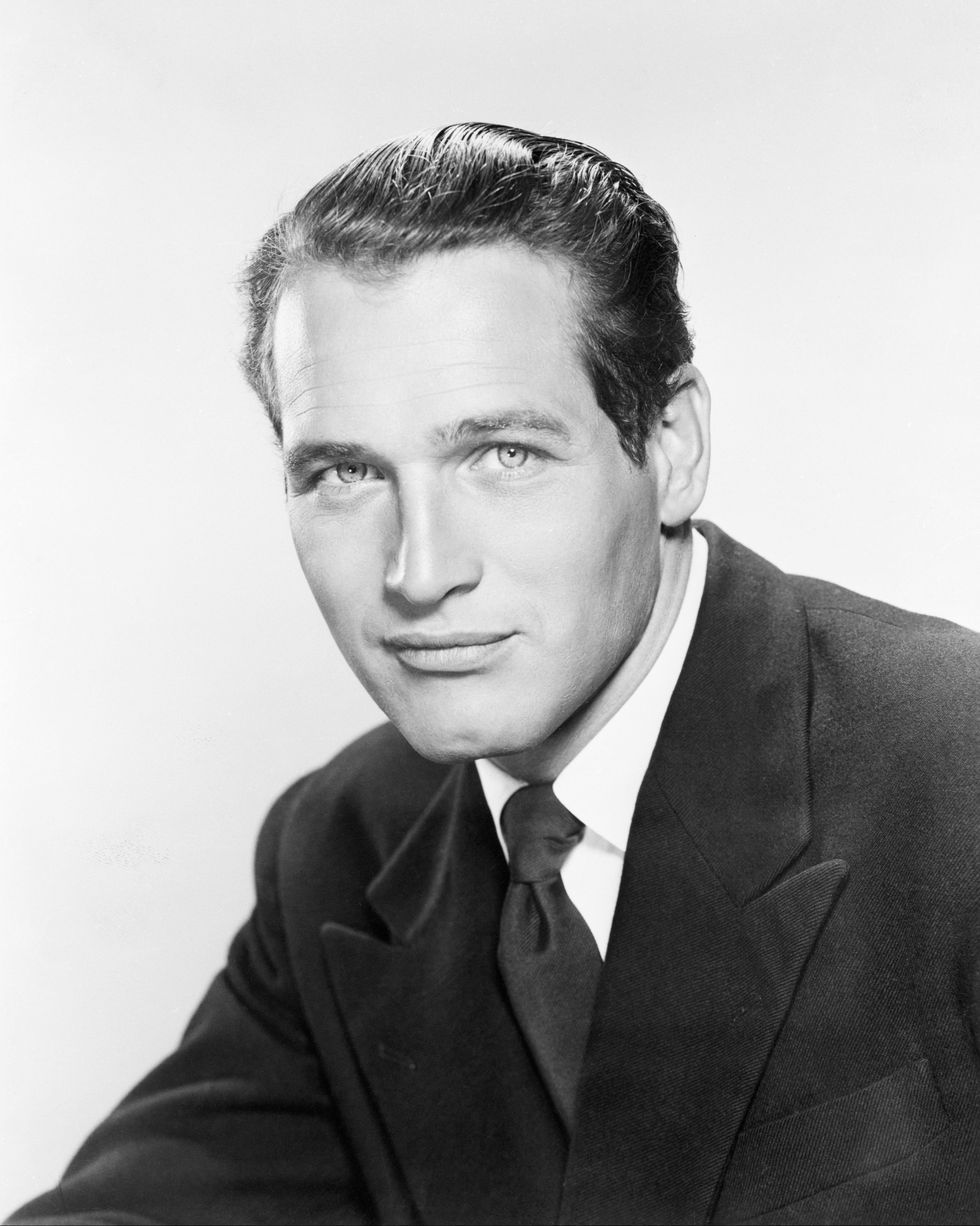
Paul Newman's performance received positive reviews, earning him the Academy Award for Best Actor.

The Color of Money received a generally positive critical response on its release, although some critics thought that the film was an inferior followup to The Hustler. Based on 48 reviews collected by Rotten Tomatoes, the film received an 88% approval rating from critics, with an average score of 7.10/10. The site's consensus reads: "That it's inferior to the original goes without saying, but Paul Newman and Tom Cruise are a joy to watch, and Martin Scorsese's direction is typically superb." Review aggregator website Metacritic reported a weighted average score of 77 out of 100, based on 17 critics, indicating "generally favorable reviews". Audiences polled by CinemaScore gave the film an average grade of "B−" on a scale of A+ to F.

The film was praised for the major cast. Vincent Canby, writing for The New York Times, commented on the "three fully realized" main characters, and that the journey with them throughout the film is "most satisfying". Canby, however, also commented that it "lacks in narrative shapeliness", before giving the film 9 out of 10.

Sheila Benson of the Los Angeles Times called these characters an "electrifying unholy trio", and praised the metaphors between hustling and pool.

Miami Herald writer Bill Cosford, however, commented that "whatever Scorsese and Price have to say about these marvelous characters, it is not anything interesting".

Tom Hutchingson of Radio Times said that Newman "deserved" to win an Oscar for his performance.

Reviewers compared The Color of Money with other Scorsese films. Jason Bailey, writing for Flavorwire, described the film as only "mid-level" for the director, but that it was so "overpowering ... jazzy and boisterous" that he could not help but enjoy.

The Chicago Tribune's Gene Siskel commented that the "grit is gone", for Scorsese was not backed up by a veteran contributor, as in his other works.

People commented that the film benefited from the cast of characters, and Scorsese's choice of actors.

=== Accolades ===
For The Color of Money, Newman received the Academy Award for Best Actor, his first Academy Award and his seventh nomination.

Award	Category	Nominee(s)	Result	Ref.
Academy Awards	Best Actor	Paul Newman	Won	
Academy Awards	Best Supporting Actress	Mary Elizabeth Mastrantonio	Nominated	
Academy Awards	Best Screenplay – Based on Material from Another Medium	Richard Price	Nominated	
Academy Awards	Best Art Direction	Boris Leven and Karen O'Hara	Nominated	
Cahiers du cinéma	Best Film	Martin Scorsese	Nominated	
Golden Globe Awards	Best Actor in a Motion Picture – Drama	Paul Newman	Nominated	
Golden Globe Awards	Best Supporting Actress – Motion Picture	Mary Elizabeth Mastrantonio	Nominated	
MTV Video Music Awards	Best Video from a Film	Eric Clapton – "It's in the Way That You Use It"	Nominated	
National Board of Review Awards	Top Ten Films		6th Place	
National Board of Review Awards	Best Actor	Paul Newman	Won	
National Society of Film Critics Awards	Best Actor	Paul Newman	3rd Place	
New York Film Critics Circle Awards	Best Actor	Paul Newman	2nd Place	
New York Film Critics Circle Awards	Best Supporting Actress	Mary Elizabeth Mastrantonio	3rd Place	

== Soundtrack ==
The soundtrack album of the motion picture was released by MCA Records in 1986. Robbie Robertson produced the score for the film.

Track listing:

1. "Who Owns This Place?" (Don Henley/Danny Kortchmar/JD Souther) – Don Henley (4:55)
2. "It's in the Way That You Use It" (Eric Clapton/Robbie Robertson) – Eric Clapton (4:00)
3. "Let Yourself in for It" (Robert Palmer) – Robert Palmer (5:20)
4. "Don't Tell Me Nothin'" (Willie Dixon) – Willie Dixon (4:42)
5. "Two Brothers and a Stranger" (Mark Knopfler) – Mark Knopfler (2:42)
6. "Standing on the Edge of Love" (Jerry Lynn Williams) – B.B. King (3:59)
7. "Modern Blues" (Robbie Robertson) – Robbie Robertson (2:57)
8. "Werewolves of London" (L. Marinell/Waddy Wachtel/Warren Zevon) – Warren Zevon (3:24)
9. "My Baby's in Love with Another Guy" (H. Brightman/L. Lucie) – Robert Palmer (2:30)
10. "The Main Title" (Robbie Robertson) – Robbie Robertson (2:46)

== Legacy ==
A line in the film spoken by Tom Cruise — "In here? Doom" — inspired the title of the popular 1993 video game, Doom.

The 1996 nine-ball challenge match between Efren Reyes and Earl Strickland was named "The Color of Money" in honor of the film. The second challenge, which took place in 2001, was titled "The Color of Money II".

The 1995 Sega Saturn video game Minnesota Fats: Pool Legend (released in Japan as Side Pocket 2) features a similar plotline to the film, in which the player controls the titular pool player in a quest to challenge against rival pool hustlers.

== Works cited ==
- Wilson, Michael (2011). Scorsese On Scorsese. Cahiers du Cinéma. ISBN 9782866427023.
