= The Hustler (novel) =

American novel about gambling

- First edition
- Author: Walter Tevis
- Publisher: Harper & Brothers
- Publication date: 1959

The Hustler is a 1959 debut novel by American writer Walter Tevis. It tells the story of a young pool hustler, Edward "Fast Eddie" Felson, who challenges the legendary Minnesota Fats. The novel was well-received by critics, and was adapted into a 1961 film of the same title, starring Paul Newman as Fast Eddie, Jackie Gleason as Minnesota Fats, and Piper Laurie as Sarah. A sequel, The Color of Money, was published in 1984.

== Synopsis ==
Eddie "Fast Eddie" Felson is a young pool hustler from Oakland, California, who travels the country with his middle-aged partner Charlie Fenniger, pretending to be a worse pool player than he actually is to win bets. He goes with Charlie to Chicago, where he plays the legendary pool player George Hegerman, known as Minnesota Fats, at Bennington’s pool hall. After beating Fats in a number of games, at one time being ahead of him by $18,000, he gets drunk and proceeds to lose to Fats, collapsing exhausted after 40 hours of playing over and over again. Eddie leaves Charlie without saying goodbye and returns to hustling.

Eddie meets a college student, Sarah, at a bus station. They commence an affair and begin to live together. Returning to Bennington’s he encounters Bert, a professional gambler, who tells Eddie that despite his talent he lost to Fats due to lack of character, as well as an ingrained eagerness to lose. Nevertheless he offers to back him in a game with a rich pool player in Kentucky named Findlay, taking 75 percent of any winnings while absorbing all losses and paying expenses. Eddie turns him down and resumes hustling. Disregarding Bert's advice, he hustles pool at a pool hall patronized by tough migrants from Appalachia. They break his thumbs.

After recuperating at Sarah's apartment, he accepts Bert's offer. Leaving Sarah behind in Chicago, they travel to Kentucky and Eddie plays Findlay at his home in Lexington. It turns out that Findlay plays billiards, not pool, which puts Eddie at a disadvantage. During the game he realizes that Findlay is a billiard hustler. Though chagrined that he is being "hustled," Eddie has an epiphany. Watching Findlay falter, he realizes the validity of what Bert had been telling him about winning being everything, how people crave an excuse to lose, and how character is as important as skill. Despite continual pain in his thumbs, he wins against Findlay. He and Bert drive back to Chicago, where Eddie reunites with Sarah but does not move back in with her. He returns to Bennington’s where he sees Charlie, who says that he had been worried about him and flew out from Oakland to find him. He confesses that he had held out $5,000 in winnings and pays it to him. Eddie proceeds to play Minnesota Fats with his own money, and beats him.

Bert demands thirty percent of his winnings and says that he is his manager. Charlie backs him up. Eddie rejects paying Bert any money and shrugs off Bert's threat to have his thumbs and an arm broken, and ridicules Bert's intimation that he has criminal connections. As the novel ends, Eddie and Bert are at a stalemate.

== Critical reception ==
New York Times critic Rex Lardner called the book "a tense, jolting trip to the tough, dusty, smoky, ball-clackety, money-filled world of the pool shark," and wrote that Tevis "writes like a streak, making straight pool as exciting as a Stanley Ketchell fight. This is a fine, swift, wanton, offbeat novel."

An unsigned review in Time said that The Hustler "has its faults as a novel, but opens the door on a world that books have not yet made commonplace". It went on to say that: "The moral of The Hustler is obviously sententious, the love story is a cliche, and author Tevis' writing is sometimes too painfully exact. What remains is a succession of scenes in which a smoky, seedy world becomes sharply alive, and where crises are intense even though the scene is grubby and the game is only pool."

Kirkus Reviews called it a "compact, tidy novel", and said: "Through a language of casual statement which does not disguise the seriousness of its intent, this exploration of moral experience is a pithy and competent performance."

== Background ==
Tevis grew up in Kentucky, and became good friends with a youth whose father bought him a pool table to keep him out of trouble. He was introduced to gambling when he was in the Navy, and a writer for Kentucky Monthly observed in 2019 that "The combination of pool and gambling started the clock ticking toward what was to come." He called himself as a "B-minus" pool player who could not play professionals with any hope of winning.

The pool rooms described in the book were fictionalized by Tevis, and he insisted that despite claims by Rudolf Wanderone to be the model of the character, Minnesota Fats was entirely fictional. He told an interviewer in 1981: "A lot of people ask me, 'When did you first meet Minnesota Fats?' And I feel like Walt Disney being asked, 'When did you meet Donald Duck?' Come on, I made him up. One of my contributions to American folklore." Tevis has described Fast Eddie's hometown of Oakland as a "disguised autobiographical reference" to San Francisco, where Tevis was born.

A pool player named Eddie Parker asserted that he was the basis for the Fast Eddie character. But Tevis maintained that Fast Eddie was fictitious, and he resented assertions to the contrary, that he had "created such memorable characters out of mere reportage". After his death in 1984, his widow debunked claims for years that the Fast Eddie character was based on a real person.

In 2019, a researcher examined the novel's original manuscript and found that Tevis had changed the character name from "New York Fats" to "Minnesota Fats," lending credence to the claim of Rudolf Wanderone, who called himself "New York Fats," that he was the inspiration for the character.

== Printing history ==
Available editions include:

- 1976: ISBN 0380008602
- 1979: ISBN 1568490445
- 2006: ISBN 1560254734
