= The Queen's Gambit (soundtrack) =

The Queen's Gambit: Music from the Netflix Limited Series

Soundtrack album by Carlos Rafael Rivera
- Released: October 23, 2020
- Recorded: 2018–2020
- Genre: Soundtrack
- Length: 1:30:07
- Label: Maisie Music Publishing
- Producer: Tom Kramer

Carlos Rafael Rivera chronology
Godless (2017)	The Queen's Gambit (2020)	Just Beyond (2021)

The Queen's Gambit: Music from the Netflix Limited Series is the soundtrack album to the period drama miniseries The Queen's Gambit, based on the 1983 novel of the same name by Walter Tevis. The original score composed by Carlos Rafael Rivera, known for his previous collaborations with the showrunner Scott Frank in A Walk Among the Tombstones (2014), and the miniseries Godless (2017). Following production on the latter, Frank pitched the one-liner from the source material for its television adaptation, in April 2018 and agreed to work on the musical score, with scoring beginning in August 2018. The series consisted of orchestral music, to focus on the "instrumental depth and color" for each episode, progressing on Beth Harmon's life.

The score album was released on October 23, 2020 through Maisie Music Publishing label, coinciding with the release on Netflix. In addition to the 38-track score, an original song entitled "I Can't Remember Love" was composed for the series, performed by Anna Hauss and written by Robert Wienröder and William Horberg, the series' executive producer. The track was released as a single on November 11, 2020, and the music video was released later in August 2021. While the soundtrack was not released in physical formats, Mondo released a two-disc vinyl set, consisting two editions of the package, unveiled on October 22, 2021.

The score was positively received with praise towards Rivera's composition. He would later win the Outstanding Music Composition for a Limited or Anthology Series, Movie, or Special at the 73rd Primetime Creative Arts Emmy Awards, in addition to two other nominations at the same ceremony. At the 64th Annual Grammy Awards, Rivera's score shared the Best Score Soundtrack for Visual Media award with Trent Reznor, Atticus Ross and Jon Batiste's score for Soul.

== Background ==
Carlos Rafael Rivera worked for three years to score the series. He was first involved in the project in April 2018, when Scott Frank, the show-runner of the series, whom Rivera worked in A Walk Among the Tombstones (2014). By then, he progressed for a research work, the following month and began scoring that August 2018. According to Frank, in an interview to Variety magazine, he felt that Rivera's music was crucial as "the chess sequences had to somehow feel emotional, even if one wasn't familiar with the game. The score also did a lot of heavy lifting when it came to the interior of Beth Harmon. While the camera was often very close, Carlos’ music somehow conveyed this inner ruin when she was at the bottom, or this soaring release when she found connection or happiness. I can't imagine the show working as well as it did without that score."

Frank initially wanted the score to be piano-based only, but later decided to go on with a classical and orchestral score, to add more "instrumental depth and color". Speaking to Variety, Rivera explained that "The piano was very present in the first episode. By the time she moves out of that world of grays and browns, it becomes a more colorful world, so we had to add instrumentation. It started to hit me: What if her reality in the orphanage is all piano, but when she looks up and plays the games on the ceiling, it's fully orchestral, like a dream?"

Rivera split the main theme for the character Beth Harmon, as "the whole story is told from Beth's point of view. It's a single character point of view story. We only see what she sees, and what that generates is a very complex character." He felt like a single theme for her as a character is "very constraining in a way, and put her in one color" and further added that, "the idea was to create music that would support her. For her addiction, it fills her and the theme fills her around. There was a musical theme for that. There was a musical theme for when she wins, or if she's up to something, if she was feeling cool, or if she makes a really interesting move in the game. I tried to use little motifs that would help generate material to be able to dress up the story as much as possible." According to Rivera, scoring for chess sequences was like "scoring 20 games differently". He further explained "It was scoring her emotional state. The games were contextual. If she was going to battle it out with Benny [one of her mentors], then there was going to be battle music."

The main title theme was written within December 2018. Rivera described that "it is not only the two people playing against each other, it's each individual playing against time. That clock is ever-present in the games. I had to let go of being at ‘quarter note equals 60’ or the tempo of an actual clock. At some point, the music just has to service the story." Discussing with Wiley Stateman, was the sound designer of the series, Rivera described about the clock-ticking sound balancing with the music, but also skeptic about the sound as "it may feel annoying to some people as the clock has its own tempo and then the music has another tempo". Rivera avoided percussive instruments to write the main theme, because he felt that "the clock is a percussion instrument in its own way. It was complicated to weave around without it becoming insanity-inducing." He also scored a theme for Beth's biological mother, and also Rivera added that through the music, he wanted to show Beth's pain, adding:

"Beth didn't know how to love in those first eight years of her life — her father was absent and her mother was unstable — and she doesn't understand that part of life. She does, however, understand chess, because she feels like she can control it. There was an empathy machine trigger that wasn't activated in the first stage of her life, to no fault of her own; the music for these flashbacks are a variation that is darker and lower. There was this melodic idea that was actually slowed down and you'd hear it in the cello, to resonate that stoned point-of-view."

== Reception ==
The soundtrack was critically acclaimed, with music critic Jonathan Broxton, calling it as "his best to date". He further compared his music to James Horner's Searching for Bobby Fischer (1993), James Newton Howard's Pawn Sacrifice (2014), and Alexandre Desplat's The Luzhin Defence (2000). Paste's Allison Keene called the score as "exceptional" as the show.

== Awards and nominations ==
Award	Date of ceremony	Category	Recipient(s)	Result	Ref.
Hollywood Music in Media Awards	January 27, 2021	Best Original Score in a TV Show/Limited Series	Carlos Rafael Rivera	Won	
Hollywood Music in Media Awards	January 27, 2021	Best Main Title Theme – TV Show/Limited Series	Carlos Rafael Rivera	Nominated	
MPSE Golden Reel Awards	April 17, 2021	Outstanding Achievement in Sound Editing – Music Score and Musical for Episodic Long Form Broadcast Media	Tom Kramer (music editor) (for "Adjournment")	Won	
Primetime Creative Arts Emmy Awards	September 11 – 12, 2021	Outstanding Music Composition for a Limited or Anthology Series, Movie, or Special	Carlos Rafael Rivera (for "End Game")	Won	
Primetime Creative Arts Emmy Awards	September 11 – 12, 2021	Outstanding Original Music and Lyrics	"I Can't Remember Love" – Anna Hauss, Robert Weinröder and William Horberg (for "Adjournment")	Nominated	
Primetime Creative Arts Emmy Awards	September 11 – 12, 2021	Outstanding Music Supervision	Randall Poster (for "Adjournment")	Nominated	
Grammy Awards	April 3, 2022	Best Score Soundtrack for Visual Media	Carlos Rafael Rivera	Won (Note: Tied with Jon Batiste, Trent Reznor and Atticus Ross for Soul.)	

== Track listing ==
All tracks are written by Carlos Rafael Rivera.

No.	Title	Length
1.	"Main Title"	1:49
2.	"Beth's Story"	2:07
3.	"Methuen Home For Children 1957"	1:14
4.	"The Scholar's Mate"	1:18
5.	"You're Gloating"	1:06
6.	"Training With Mr. Schaibel"	3:04
7.	"Am I Good Enough Now?"	1:18
8.	"Playing Mr. Ganz"	1:36
9.	"Ceiling Games"	2:17
10.	"First Day At School"	1:12
11.	"The Green Pills"	1:30
12.	"Kentucky State Championship 1963"	1:12
13.	"Top Boards"	1:01
14.	"Playing Townes"	3:45
15.	"Playing Beltik"	3:10
16.	"The Lake – Cincinnati"	1:48
17.	"Playing Benny – Las Vegas 1966"	4:28
18.	"Two Sides Of The Same Coin"	2:47
19.	"Mexico City Invitational 1966"	1:21
20.	"Playing Girev I"	2:01
21.	"Playing Girev II"	2:23
22.	"Borgov I"	3:37
23.	"Beth Alone"	2:02
24.	"Ohio US Championship 1967"	1:40
25.	"New York"	1:09
26.	"Training With Benny"	2:15
27.	"Paris Tournament 1967"	2:26
28.	"Borgov II"	2:27
29.	"Jolene!"	1:55
30.	"Returning To Methuen"	1:10
31.	"Point"	2:05
32.	"USSR"	1:06
33.	"Moscow Invitational 1968"	7:27
34.	"Close Your Eyes"	2:31
35.	"Borgov III"	3:09
36.	"The Final Game"	7:23
37.	"Take It, It's Yours"	2:07
38.	"Sygrayem (Let's Play)"	2:11
Total length:		90:17

Songs featured in the series:

- "Finale/Hallelujah" – Alfred Newman and Mike McDonald
- "You're the One" – The Vogues
- "Comin' Home Baby" – Quincy Jones
- "Somewhere I Belong" – Gabor Szabo
- "Bert's Blues" – Donovan
- "Along Comes Mary" – The Association
- "The Gift" – Storefront Church
- "Fever" – Peggy Lee
- "Bye-ya" – Thelonious Monk
- "Classical Gas" – Mason Williams
- "(I'm Not Your) Steppin' Stone" – The Monkees
- "Teach Me Tonight" – Nancy Wilson and Ron McMaster
- "Stop Your Sobbing" – The Kinks
- "Pink Champagne" – Georgie Fame and the Blue Flames
- "Yeh, Yeh" – Georgie Fame and the Blue Flames
- "Tut tut tut tut" – Gillian Hills
- "Venus" – Shocking Blue
- "Jimmy Mack" – Laura Nyro and LaBelle
- "Ave Maris Stella" – Our Lady of Perpetual Help Chant Choir
- "String Quartet No. 3 in F Major, Op. 73: IV Adagio" – Dmitri Shostakovich and Eder Quartet

== Charts ==
Chart (2020)	Peak position
UK Soundtrack Albums (OCC)	23

== Personnel ==
Credits adapted from Allmusic

- Carlos Rafael Rivera – composer, producer
- Asuka Ito, David Randal Stal – additional music
- Joy Adams – cello (track: 31)
- Shea Kole – cello (tracks: 2, 3, 6, 15, 17, 23, 34)
- Siobhan Cronin – violin (tracks: 2, 6, 17, 23)
- The Budapest Art Orchestra – orchestra
- Miklos Lukacs – orchestra conductor
- Jeremy Levy – orchestration
- Gill Humphrey, Tim Ryan – additional orchestration
- Tom Kramer – music editor
- Gabor Buczko – recording engineer
- Dávid Lukács – pro-tools engineer
- Lawrence Manchester – mixing
- Pejtsik Péter – music conductor
- Tori Fillat – music contractor
- Eric Hoehne – music consultant
- Mark Cally – music preparation
- Alan Hynes – packaging, design and art direction
