= Russell Lewis (disambiguation) =

Russell Lewis (born 1963) is an English television writer and former actor.

Russell Lewis may also refer to:

- Russell A. Lewis (1895–1966), American college football coach
- Russell Dennis Lewis, American twin brother of actor Matthew Dennis Lewis
- Russell Lewis (chairman), former chairman of the Bow Group
- Russell Lewis (choreographer) (1908–1992), American choreographer, dancer, and theatre producer
- Russell Lewis (footballer) (born 1956), Welsh footballer
- Russell T. Lewis (born 1947), CEO of the New York Times Company
