= Hollywood Music in Media Award for Best Main Title Theme – TV Show/Limited Series =

Annual award

The Hollywood Music in Media Award for Best Main Title Theme – TV Show/Limited Series is one of the awards given annually to composers working in the television industry by the Hollywood Music in Media Awards (HMMA). It is presented to the songwriters who have composed the best "original" song, written specifically for an animated film. The award was first given in 2014, during the fifth annual awards.

== Winners and nominees ==
=== 2010s ===
Best Main Title Theme – TV Show/Digital Streaming Series

| Year | Series | Composer | Network |
|---|---|---|---|
(2014); 5th
| (2014); 5th | The Leftovers | Max Richter | HBO |
| (2014); 5th | Black Sails | Bear McCreary | Starz |
| (2014); 5th | Cosmos: A Spacetime Odyssey | Alan Silvestri | Fox |
| (2014); 5th | Sleepy Hollow | Brian Tyler and Robert Lydecker | Fox |
| (2014); 5th | Vitro | David Alonso Garzón | |
(2015); 6th
| (2015); 6th | Tyrant | Jeff & Mychael Danna | FX |
| (2015); 6th | The Dovekeepers | Jeff Beal | CBS |
| (2015); 6th | Marco Polo | Daniele Luppi | Netflix |
| (2015); 6th | Penny Dreadful | Abel Korzeniowski | Showtime |
| (2015); 6th | Texas Rising | Bruce Broughton & John Debney | History |
| (2015); 6th | Transparent | Dustin O’Halloran | Amazon |
| (2015); 6th | The Whispers | Robert Duncan | ABC |
(2016); 7th
| (2016); 7th | The Night Manager | Victor Reyes | AMC |
| (2016); 7th | The Crown | Hans Zimmer | Netflix |
| (2016); 7th | Luke Cage | Adrian Younge & Ali Shaheed Muhammad | Netflix |
| (2016); 7th | Narcos | Rodrigo Amarante | Netflix |
| (2016); 7th | Stranger Things | Michael Stein & Kyle Dixon | Netflix |

Best Main Title Theme –TV Show/Limited Series

| Year | Series | Composer | Network |
|---|---|---|---|
(2017); 8th
| (2017); 8th | A Series of Unfortunate Events | Nick Urata and Daniel Handler | Netflix |
| (2017); 8th | Feud: Bette and Joan | Mac Quayle | FX |
| (2017); 8th | Genius | Hans Zimmer & Lorne Balfe | Nat Geo |
| (2017); 8th | The Good Fight | David Buckley | CBS All Access |
| (2017); 8th | Luke Cage | Adrian Younge & Ali Shaheed Muhammad | Netflix |
| (2017); 8th | The Orville | Bruce Broughton | Fox |
(2018); 9th
| (2018); 9th | Godless | Carlos Rafael Rivera | Netflix |
| (2018); 9th | Altered Carbon | Jeff Russo | Netflix |
| (2018); 9th | Howards End | Nico Muhly | Starz |
| (2018); 9th | The Kominsky Method | Jeff Cardoni | Netflix |
| (2018); 9th | The Last Tycoon | Mychael Danna | Amazon |
| (2018); 9th | The Putin Interviews | Jeff Beal | Showtime |
(2019); 10th
| (2019); 10th | Our Planet | Steven Price | Netflix |
| (2019); 10th | Killing Eve | Unloved | BBC America |
| (2019); 10th | NOS4A2 | Mike Patton | AMC |
| (2019); 10th | Seis Manos | Carl Thiel | Netflix |
| (2019); 10th | Tom Clancy's Tom Ryan | Ramin Djawadi | Amazon |

=== 2020s ===
| Year | Series | Supervisor(s) | Network |
|---|---|---|---|
(2020); 11th
| (2020); 11th | Hollywood | Nathan Barr | Netflix |
| (2020); 11th | Hunters | Trevor Gureckis | Amazon |
| (2020); 11th | Marvel's 616 | Jeremy Turner | Disney+ |
| (2020); 11th | P-Valley | Jucee Froot & Katori Hall | Starz |
| (2020); 11th | The Queen's Gambit | Carlos Rafael Rivera | Netflix |
| (2020); 11th | The Witcher | Sonya Belousova & Giona Ostinelli | Netflix |
(2021); 12th
| (2021); 12th | The Wonder Years | Scotty Granger, Roahn Hylton & Jacob Yoffee | ABC |
| (2021); 12th | Allen v. Farrow | Michael Abels | HBO |
| (2021); 12th | BMF | Curtis "50 Cent" Jackson ft. Charlie Wilson | Starz |
| (2021); 12th | Heels | Ben Bridwell & Jeff Cardoni | Starz |
| (2021); 12th | Schmigadoon! | Cinco Paul | Apple TV+ |
| (2021); 12th | Yasuke | Flying Lotus & Thundercat | Netflix |
(2022); 13th
| (2022); 13th | Yellowjackets | Craig Wedren and Anna Waronker | Showtime |
| (2022); 13th | 1883 | Brian Tyler and Breton Vivian | Paramount+ |
| (2022); 13th | Dangerous Liaisons | Anne Nikitin | Starz |
| (2022); 13th | Slow Horses | Mick Jagger and Daniel Pemberton | Apple TV+ |
| (2022); 13th | Wednesday | Danny Elfman | Netflix |
(2023); 14th
| (2023); 14th | Shrinking | Benjamin Gibbard and Tom Howe | Apple TV+ |
| (2023); 14th | Dear Edward | Benj Pasek, Justin Paul, and Lizzy McAlpine | Apple TV+ |
| (2023); 14th | My Kind of Country | Zach Dawes and Reyna Roberts | Apple TV+ |
| (2023); 14th | Percy Jackson and the Olympians | Bear McCreary | Disney+ |
| (2023); 14th | Queen Charlotte: A Bridgerton Story | Kris Bowers | Netflix |
| (2023); 14th | The Rising | Carly Paradis | Sky Studios |
(2024); 15th
| (2024); 15th | Masters of the Air | Blake Neely | Apple TV+ |
| (2024); 15th | Hotel Cocaine | Swizz Beatz | MGM+ |
| (2024); 15th | Manhunt | Danielle Ponder | Apple TV+ |
| (2024); 15th | Palm Royale | Jeff Toyne | Apple TV+ |
| (2024); 15th | Sweetpea | Isobel Waller-Bridge and Chinchilla | Sky Atlantic |
| (2024); 15th | The Legend of Vox Machina | Neal Acree | Amazon Prime Video |
(2025); 16th
| (2025); 16th | Your Friends & Neighbors | Dominic Lewis and Hamilton Leithauser | Apple TV+ |
| (2025); 16th | Chief of War | Hans Zimmer, James Everingham and Kaumakaiwa Kanaka'ole | Apple TV+ |
| (2025); 16th | Étoile | Sons of Raphael | Amazon Prime Video |
| (2025); 16th | Government Cheese | Pharrell Williams | Apple TV+ |
| (2025); 16th | Outlander: Blood of My Blood | Bear McCreary and Julie Fowlis | Starz |
(2026); 17th
| (2026); 17th | Pluribus | Dave Porter (writer); Kenya Hathaway (performer) | Apple TV |
| (2026); 17th | Fightland | Curtis Jackson III and Ky Miller (writers); Curtis "50 Cent" Jackson featuring Jeremih (performers) | Starz |
| (2026); 17th | Lucky | Fiona Apple (writer/performer) | Apple TV |
| (2026); 17th | Spider-Noir | Sebastian Kole, Warren "Oak" Felder and Jayme Silverstein (writers); Kirby (performer) | MGM+/Amazon Prime Video |
| (2026); 17th | The Greatest | Wyclef Jean and Ben Watkins (writers); Kofi Black (performer) | Amazon Prime Video |
| (2026); 17th | The Vampire Lestat | Daniel Hart (writer); Sam Reid (performer) | AMC |
