= Scott Frank =

American screenwriter and director (born 1960)

- Scott Frank at Bloody Scotland 2026
- Born: March 10, 1960 (age 66); Fort Walton Beach, Florida, U.S.
- Education: University of California, Santa Barbara (BA); American Film Institute (MFA)
- Occupations: Film director, producer, screenwriter, author

A. Scott Frank (born March 10, 1960) is an American film director, producer, screenwriter, and author. Frank has received two Academy Award nominations for Best Adapted Screenplay, the first for Out of Sight (1998) and the second for Logan (2017). His film work, credited and uncredited, extends to dozens of films. In recent years, he has worked for Netflix on television miniseries, most prominently writing and directing Godless, The Queen's Gambit and Dept. Q.

== Early life and education ==
Frank was born to a Jewish family in Fort Walton Beach, Florida, on March 10, 1960. His family moved to Los Gatos, California where he attended high school while his father worked as a pilot for Pan Am. He attended the University of California, Santa Barbara, graduating in 1982 with a Bachelor of Arts in film studies.

== Career ==
While a student at the University of California, Frank first had the idea for what would become the script for Little Man Tate in 1981, thinking that, in the aftermath of the Iran hostage crisis there was "a slight petulance to world events at the time" and envisioning "an eight year old who was making more sense of the world than Ted Koppel." After graduation he worked as a bartender while attempting to sell the script, which eventually led to his hiring an agent, and subsequently being hired by Paramount Pictures in 1984. It would take several years before the script was produced, with Frank's first filmed work being the 1987 film Plain Clothes, which he would later describe as "terrible." Little Man Tate was ultimately made in 1991 as the directorial debut of Jodie Foster.

In the years to follow, Frank's filmography included scripts for Dead Again, Malice, Heaven's Prisoners, and Get Shorty. The last earned him his first award nominations with both the Writers Guild and the Golden Globes. He credited the success of Get Shorty with reviving his interest in the job after a bad experience on Malice, and was particularly pleased as a longtime fan of Elmore Leonard's novels that he felt had not received satisfactory film adaptations previously. This success led to his being asked to work on another Elmore Leonard adaptation, Steven Soderbergh's 1998 film Out of Sight starring George Clooney and Jennifer Lopez. The film was not a commercial success but earned critical plaudits. Frank won both the Writers Guild of America Award for Best Adapted Screenplay and the Edgar Award from the Mystery Writers of America, and was nominated for the Academy Award for Best Adapted Screenplay.

Frank was recruited by Steven Spielberg to work on the script for Minority Report, a Philip K. Dick adaptation, which he would later say was "a very difficult screenplay to write because it was loaded with so much technical detail." He performed second unit directing duties for one segment of the film, an area of filmmaking he had contemplated moving into for some time. Minority Report earned him the Saturn Award for Best Writing and several other nominations, including for Hugo and Nebula awards. Other credits from this period included The Interpreter and Marley & Me, the latter described as a film he would not have imagined himself working on but which he developed "a big soft spot for." By 2024, Frank had worked on nearly 60 films, including uncredited rewrites on films such as Saving Private Ryan, Entrapment, Dawn of the Dead, Night at the Museum and Gravity.

Frank made his directorial debut in 2007 on The Lookout, whose script he had begun in 1998 and which was originally meant to be directed by Sam Mendes, who eventually departed the project to make Road to Perdition while encouraging Frank to take on the task himself. He had also attempted to recruit Sydney Pollack, the director of The Interpreter whom he considered a mentor, to direct the project. He won the Independent Spirit Award for Best First Feature for his work on the film. His second film as a director, 2014's A Walk Among the Tombstones, had a more mixed reception. In January 2016, Frank published his first novel, Shaker, a crime mystery published by Penguin Random House. He also worked in the burgeoning superhero genre, making two films with director James Mangold, The Wolverine (2013) and Logan (2017). For the latter, he received his second Academy Award nomination.

Having had previous experience working for network television, Frank had begun to develop Godless, previously intended as a film, into a miniseries for HBO. However, Netflix outbid HBO for the project, which Frank wrote and directed. The miniseries earned Frank numerous award nominations, including from the Directors Guild and three Primetime Emmy Awards. The success of Godless led Frank to pitch further projects to Netflix, several of which were rejected, until they expressed interest in The Queen's Gambit, an adaptation of a Walter Tevis novel that Frank had previously attempted to make as a film. Frank said that he viewed the novel as exploring "the cost of genius", a theme that he had first intended to explore in Little Man Tate but "didn't quite get there with it."

Frank won the 2021 Emmy for Outstanding Directing for a Limited or Anthology Series or Movie.

== Filmography ==
=== Film ===
Screenwriter

Year	Title	Director	Notes
1988	Plain Clothes	Martha Coolidge	
1991	Dead Again	Kenneth Branagh	
1991	Little Man Tate	Jodie Foster	
1991	The Walter Ego	John Putch	Short film
1993	Malice	Harold Becker	
1995	Get Shorty	Barry Sonnenfeld	
1996	Heaven's Prisoners	Phil Joanou	
1998	Out of Sight	Steven Soderbergh	
2002	Minority Report	Steven Spielberg	Also second unit director (uncredited)
2004	Flight of the Phoenix	John Moore	
2005	The Interpreter	Sydney Pollack	
2008	Marley & Me	David Frankel	
2013	The Wolverine	James Mangold	
2017	Logan	James Mangold	

Director

Year	Title	Director	Writer	Notes	Ref
2007	The Lookout	Yes	Yes		
2014	A Walk Among the Tombstones	Yes	Yes		

Producer

Year	Title	Director	Notes
2001	The Caveman's Valentine	Kasi Lemmons	
2022	No Exit	Damien Power	

=== Television ===
Year	Title	Director	Writer	Executive producer	Creator	Notes
1988	The Wonder Years	No	Yes	No	No	Episode "The Phone Call"
1993	Fallen Angels	No	Yes	No	No	Episode "Dead End for Delia"
1994	Birdland	No	Yes	Yes	Yes	Episodes "Pilot" and "Plan B"
2004	Karen Sisco	No	Yes	No	No	Episode "He Was a Friend of Mine"
2011	Shameless	Yes	No	No	No	Episode "It's Time to Kill the Turtle"
2017	Godless	Yes	Yes	Yes	Yes	Miniseries
2020	The Queen's Gambit	Yes	Yes	Yes	Yes	Miniseries
2024	Monsieur Spade	Yes	Yes	Yes	Yes	Miniseries
2025	Dept. Q	Yes	Yes	Yes	Yes	

== Awards and nominations ==
Year	Award	Category	Work	Result	Ref.
1992	Edgar Awards	Best Motion Picture Screenplay	Dead Again	Nominated	
1996	Writers Guild of America Awards	Best Adapted Screenplay	Get Shorty	Nominated	
1996	USC Scripter Awards	Film	Get Shorty	Nominated	
1996	Edgar Awards	Best Motion Picture Screenplay	Get Shorty	Nominated	
1996	Golden Globe Awards	Best Screenplay	Get Shorty	Nominated	
1998	Boston Society of Film Critics Awards	Best Screenplay	Out of Sight	Won	
1999	Writers Guild of America Awards	Best Adapted Screenplay	Out of Sight	Won	
1999	Online Film Critics Society Awards	Best Adapted Screenplay	Out of Sight	Won	
1999	National Society of Film Critics Awards	Best Screenplay	Out of Sight	Won	
1999	Edgar Awards	Best Motion Picture Screenplay	Out of Sight	Won	
1999	Academy Awards	Best Adapted Screenplay	Out of Sight	Nominated	
2002	Bram Stoker Awards	Best Screenplay	Minority Report	Nominated	
2003	Online Film Critics Society Awards	Best Adapted Screenplay	Minority Report	Nominated	
2003	Hugo Awards	Best Dramatic Presentation — Long Form	Minority Report	Nominated	
2003	Saturn Awards	Best Writing	Minority Report	Won	
2004	Nebula Awards	Best Script	Minority Report	Nominated	
2007	Satellite Awards	Best Adapted Screenplay	The Lookout	Nominated	
2008	Independent Spirit Awards	Best First Feature	The Lookout	Won	
2008	Edgar Awards	Best Motion Picture Screenplay	The Lookout	Nominated	
2017	Chicago Film Critics Association Awards	Best Adapted Screenplay	Logan	Nominated	
2018	Writers Guild of America Awards	Best Adapted Screenplay	Logan	Nominated	
2018	Writers Guild of America Awards	Long Form – Original	Godless	Nominated	
2018	USC Scripter Awards	Film	Logan	Nominated	
2018	Directors Guild of America Awards	Outstanding Directing – Miniseries or TV Film	Godless	Nominated	
2018	Academy Awards	Best Adapted Screenplay	Logan	Nominated	
2018	Nebula Awards	Outstanding Dramatic Presentation	Logan	Nominated	
2018	Primetime Emmy Awards	Outstanding Limited or Anthology Series	Godless	Nominated	
2018	Primetime Emmy Awards	Outstanding Directing for a Limited Series	Godless	Nominated	
2018	Primetime Emmy Awards	Outstanding Writing for a Limited Series	Godless	Nominated	
2018	Saturn Awards	Best Writing	Logan	Nominated	
2021	Golden Globe Awards	Best Miniseries or Television Film	The Queen's Gambit	Won	
2021	Writers Guild of America Awards	Long Form – Adapted	The Queen's Gambit	Won	
2021	Producers Guild of America Awards	Best Limited Series Television	The Queen's Gambit	Won	
2021	Directors Guild of America Awards	Outstanding Directing – Miniseries or TV Film	The Queen's Gambit	Won	
2021	USC Scripter Awards	Television	The Queen's Gambit (Episode: "Openings")	Won	
2021	Primetime Emmy Awards	Outstanding Limited or Anthology Series (together with William Horberg and Allan Scott)	The Queen's Gambit	Won	
2021	Primetime Emmy Awards	Outstanding Directing for a Limited or Anthology Series or Movie	The Queen's Gambit	Won	
2021	Primetime Emmy Awards	Outstanding Writing for a Limited or Anthology Series or Movie	The Queen's Gambit	Nominated	
