= Schloss Schulzendorf =

Manor house in Berlin, Germany

Coordinates: 52°21′35″N 13°34′23″E

Schloss Schulzendorf is a Berlin-based manor house from 1889, located in the Brandenburg district of Dahme-Spreewald in Schulzendorf. It was built for a Jewish owner and ultimately usurped by the Third Reich. It is one of the filming sites of the Netflix series The Queens Gambit.

== History and location ==
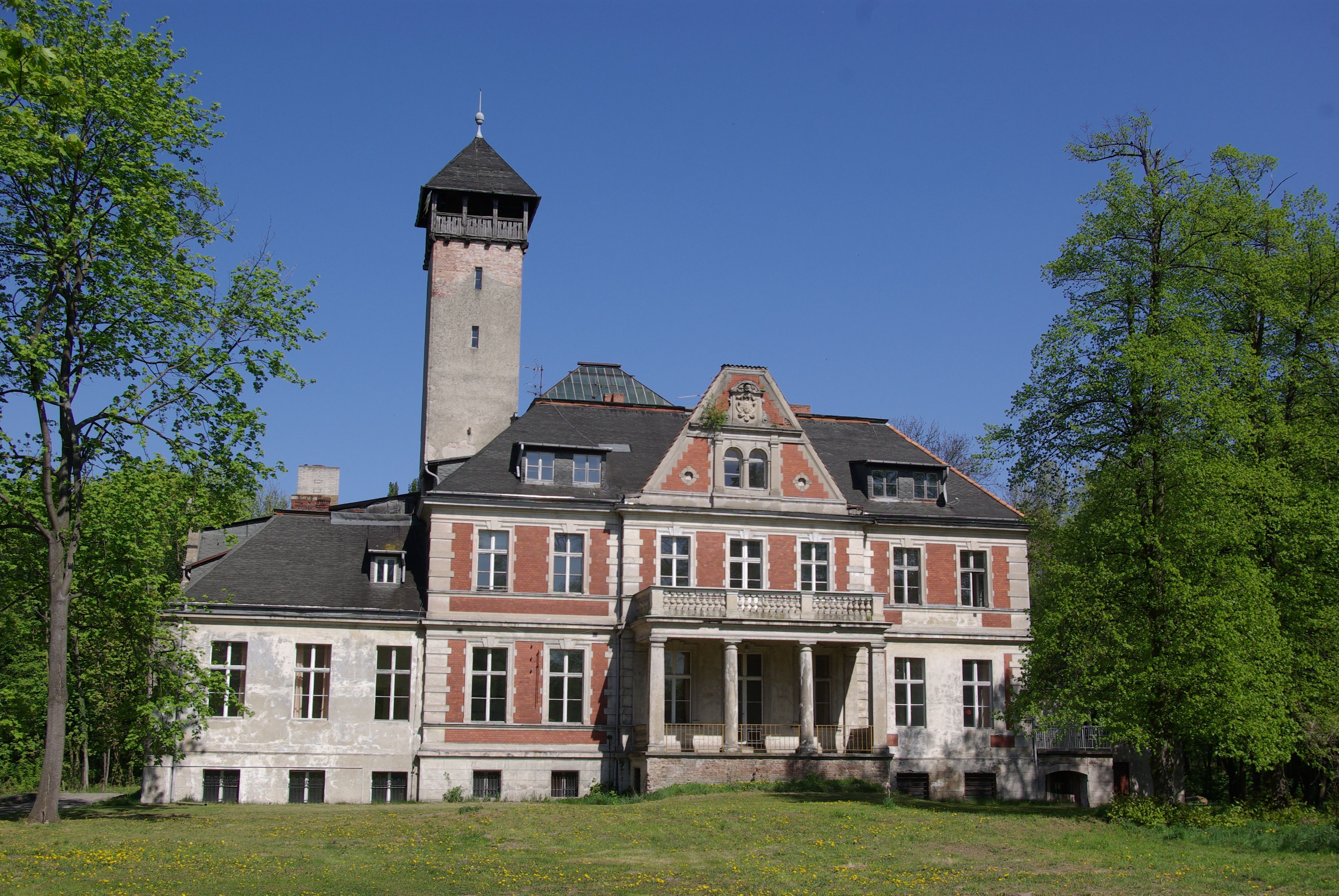
Schloss Schulzendorf

The castle is at the center of the Schulzendorf village, built on a former knight's estate. The first castle at the site, built during the 17th or 18th century, was owned by David Gottlob von Gersdorf.

Over subsequent years, the castle was owned by King Frederick William I of Prussia, then by Eberhard von der Recke, the civil governor of Saxony and then by Meyer Jacobson. In 1889, Jewish businessman Moritz Israel, heir of the Nathan Israel Department Store, bought the site after selling the shares in the store to his brother. He then constructed the current castle. It was Moritz Israel's gift to his son Richard for his wedding to Bianca Cohn.

According to The Times of Israel, "for three decades, [Richard and Bianca] generously funded developments in town, from providing access to clean drinking water to building schools. They also paid for the town to have electrical lines installed".

During the early years of Nazi rule, much of the family was able to leave Germany. In 1939, Richard Israel was dispossessed of Schloss Schulzendorf. The couple was transported to Theresienstadt, a hybrid ghetto-concentration camp where Richard died in 1943. Bianca survived the war and lived for another 20 years in Hanover.

After 1945, the Schloss Schulzendorf was in East Germany where it was used as a "resettlement home" and for teaching mechanical workshops. In 1993, after German reunification, the government retook ownership of the castle and restored it to descendants of the Israel family. The property has not been maintained since that time.

=== On television ===
Some outdoor scenes for The Queens Gambit were filmed for Netflix at this building, which stood in for the fictional Methuen Home, a girls' orphanage in Kentucky. The article published in Israel explained how the Schloss became the orphanage in the TV series:

"Built in neo-Renaissance style, the castle has an imposing central tower and glass-roofed greenhouse, or winter garden. For “The Queen’s Gambit,” digital editing helped the medieval-looking tower perfectly match the historic building façade. The crumbling roof received dozens of new, CGI-generated shingles, among other alterations."

All of the scenes for the Netflix series were filmed in Germany and in Ontario, Canada.
