= Bow Group =

British conservative think tank

The Bow Group
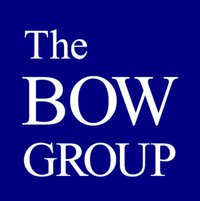
- Formation: 7 February 1951; 75 years ago
- Type: Public policy think tank
- Headquarters: London
- Official language: English
- Chairman: Ben Harris-Quinney
- Key people: Geoffrey Howe, Norman Lamont, Roger Scruton, David Starkey, Norman Tebbit
- Website: www.bowgroup.org

The Bow Group is a UK-based think tank promoting conservative opinion. Founded in 1951, it is the oldest group of its kind, counting many senior Conservative Party MPs and peers among its members. It represents a forum for political debate with its varied programme of events and official journal.

== Profile ==
Although often associated with the Conservative Party, the group is now perhaps better categorised as a right-wing think tank. The Bow Group exists to publish and promote the research and policy proposals of its members, through policy papers, policy briefs and larger collaborative projects.

The group's journal, Crossbow, usually published four times a year, and the group's programme of meetings during the parliamentary year also provide its members and guest speakers and writers with a forum for political debate.

The Bow Group accepts applications for membership. It also accepts outside donations, sponsorship and advertising.

The chairman of the Bow Group has been Ben Harris-Quinney since 2011. In 2015, he was disowned by four of the Bow Group's patrons and suspended from the Conservative Party. In 2016, he was accused by Andrew Neil on BBC's Daily Politics show of being a "Walter Mitty figure" and dismissed by Lord Heseltine as being "of no account". The commentator Iain Dale has accused him of having turned the Bow Group into an "impotent and irrelevant vehicle for Harris-Quinney to seek airtime for himself".

== History ==
The Bow Group was founded by a group of students with the aim of providing an effective counter to socialism and the Fabian Society. Since then, it has expanded under chairmen such as Geoffrey Howe, Leon Brittan, Norman Lamont, Michael Howard, Peter Lilley, Christopher Bland, and David Campbell Bannerman.

Much of the group's thought can be categorised as conservatism supporting both a market economy and social responsibility. The reputation of the group was founded on the need for innovative conservative thinking to address the pressing problems of the day. In keeping with this trend, it was The Bow Group which promoted the idea of a World Refugee Year in the late 1950s. In the 1960s, the group attracted significant controversy in Conservative circles over its support for Kenyan independence. In the 1970s and early 1980s, the group was closely associated with the development of post-Keynesian economics and government policy for the Arts etc. The publication in 1973 of Peter Lilley's Alternative Manifesto marked the beginnings of the intellectual shift from the policies of the Heath government. The group was later in the vanguard of developing policy on privatisation and new enterprise zones, and promoting the extension of share ownership. The group continued to publish pamphlets on a wide range of issues during the 1980s, 1990s and 2000s.

In July 2012, the Bow Group, reflecting on 60 years of its history in British politics, appointed former British Prime Minister John Major as its President and Lords Howe, Howard and Lamont as its Senior Patrons to serve on the advisory board of the organisation. In 2014 the conservative academics David Starkey and Roger Scruton joined the advisory board, with Scruton addressing the Group on the difference between modern Conservatism and ideological conservatism. In 2015 Norman Tebbit, former Conservative Party chairman and long-term confidant of Margaret Thatcher, also joined the board. Addressing the organisation at a lecture prior to his appointment he criticised the centrism and lack of ideological clarity in the modern Conservative Party, and called for an end to the "Bedroom Tax".

In May 2015, with polls pointing to a hung Parliament in the run up to the 2015 general election, the Bow Group chairman, Ben Harris-Quinney, called on voters in marginal constituencies to support the values of conservatism by voting UK Independence Party (UKIP) where Conservative Party candidates could not win, and the Conservatives where UKIP could not win. However, this suggestion of tactical voting was opposed by Bow Group patrons Lords Heseltine, Howard and Lamont, in a joint statement.

In 2015, Lord Tebbit was appointed as the Bow Group's President, replacing Sir John Major who had stepped down in 2014.

=== Policies ===
The Bow Group was a supporter of Brexit and worked with both pro-Brexit campaigns to support Britain's exit from the EU.

In 2016, long-standing member Heseltine was removed from the organisation on the basis that he did not support conservative ideals. He was criticised by the group's then-President, Lord Tebbit, for being a "backstabber" and betraying Britain in favour of the European Union.

== Chairmen of the Bow Group ==
Years	Chairman
1951–52	Bruce Griffiths
1952–53	James Lemkin (first term)
1953–54	Richard Stone
1954–55	Robin Williams
1955–56	Geoffrey Howe
1956–58^{[A]}	James Lemkin (second term)
1958–59	Russell Lewis
1959–60	David Hennessy (first time)
1960–61	Tom Hooson
1961–62	David Howell
1962–63	David Hennessy (second time)
1963–64	John MacGregor
1964–65	Leon Brittan
1965–66	Henry Bosch
1966–67	Julian Critchley
1967–68	Reginald Watts
1968–69	Christopher Brocklebank-Fowler
1969–70	Christopher Bland
1970–71	Michael Howard
1971–72	Norman Lamont
1972–73	Peter Lloyd
1973–75^{[A]}	Peter Lilley
1975–76	Patricia Hodgson
1976–77	Ian Clarke
1977–78	Michael Stern
1978–79	Douglas French
1979–80	Richard Barber
1980–81	Richard Simmons
1981–82	Nirj Deva
1982–83	Colin Coulson-Thomas
1983–84	David Shaw
1984–85	Michael Lingens
1985–86	Nick Perry
1986–87	Nigel Waterson
1987–88	Cheryl Gillan
1988–89	Marie-Louise Rossi
1989–90	Ian Donaldson
1990–91	David Harvey
1991–92	Dexter Jerome Smith
1992–93	Nick Hawkins
1993–94	David Campbell Bannerman
1994–95	Alexander Nicoll
1995–96	Nick Button
1996–97	Jeremy Bradshaw
1997–98	Nick Green
1998–99	Nick Edgar
1999–2000	Andrew Jones
2000–01	Guy Strafford
2001–02	Damian Hinds
2002–03	Jocelyn Ormond
2003–04	Giles Taylor
2004–05	Chris Philp
2005–06	Kwasi Kwarteng
2006–07	Sam Gyimah
2007–08	Chris Skidmore
2008–10^{[A]}	Annesley Abercorn
2010–11	Brian Cattell
2011–	Ben Harris-Quinney
^A Two consecutive terms.

== Recent contributions ==
In March 2012, the Bow Group released a report opposing the Government's plans to trial badger culling in England, stating that the findings of the previous Labour government's major badger culling trials several years earlier were that culling does not work. The paper was authored by Graham Godwin-Pearson with a foreword by Brian May and contributions by leading tuberculosis scientists, including Lord Krebs.

In April 2012, at a Bow Group debate with David Starkey, Shami Chakrabarti and Kwasi Kwarteng, Starkey described Scottish First Minister Alex Salmond as a "Caledonian Hitler".

In May 2013, the Bow Group warned MPs of the dangers of privatising Royal Mail, including the potential for stamps to increase in price, the threat to rural Post Offices and the political danger to the Conservative Party. The Bow Group also warned that Royal Mail was being significantly under-valued by the Government in its flotation by over £1 billion, which proved to be accurate.

In April 2014 Priti Patel, writing in the Bow Group's Crossbow magazine, called for the coalition to come to an end stating that the country wanted to see "more Conservative policies", and with growth figures of 2.7% the reasons for the existence of the Coalition Government had "effectively expired". These calls were echoed by the Chairman of the 1922 Committee Graham Brady, at a Bow Group debate in July 2014.

In October 2015 the Bow Group joined the Leave.EU organisation and declared it would be campaigning for Britain's exit from the European Union.

== See also ==
- List of UK think tanks
