= Nathan Israel Department Store =

Former department store in Berlin, Germany

Coordinates: 52.517636°N 13.408731°E

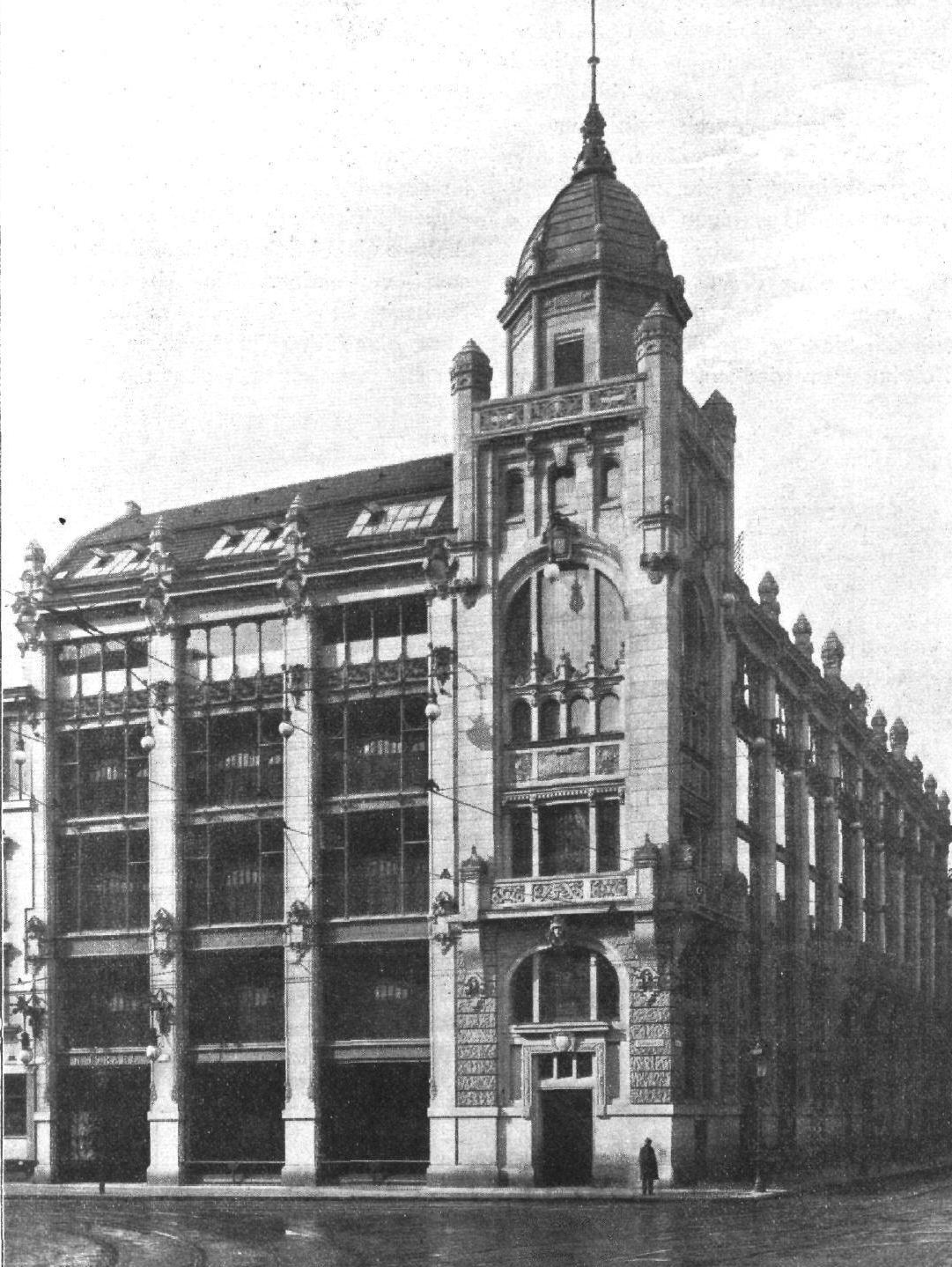
Kaufhaus N. Israel

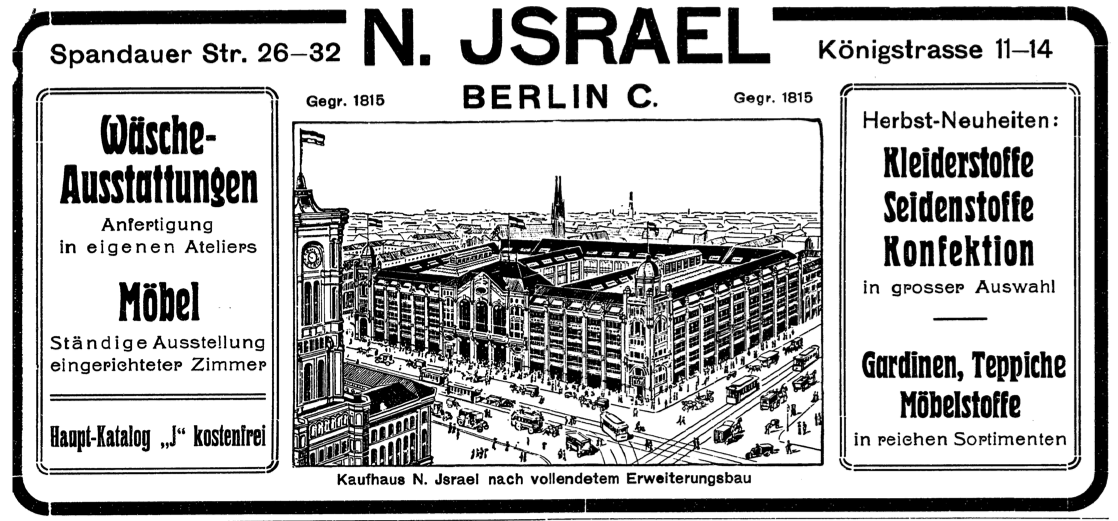
Advertisement, in: Ost und West. Illustrierte Monatsschrift für das gesamte Judentum, October 1912.

The Nathan Israel Department Store (German: Kaufhaus Nathan Israel or Kaufhaus N. Israel) was a department store in Berlin. The business was started in 1815 by Nathan Israel as a small second-hand store in the Molkenmarkt. By 1925, it employed over 2,000 people and was a member of the Berlin Stock Exchange, and in the 1930s was one of the largest retail establishments in Europe. Because it was owned by Jews, the store was boycotted by the German government when the Nazi Party came to power in 1933. It was ransacked during the Kristallnacht in 1938 and then handed over to a non-Jewish family by the Nazis. The descendants of the original owners began to receive compensation for their losses after the fall of the Berlin Wall in 1989. The last owner and manager from the Israel family, Wilfrid Israel, was active in the rescue of thousands of Jews from Nazi Germany and played a significant role in the initiation of the Kindertransport.

== Takeover by German Nazis ==
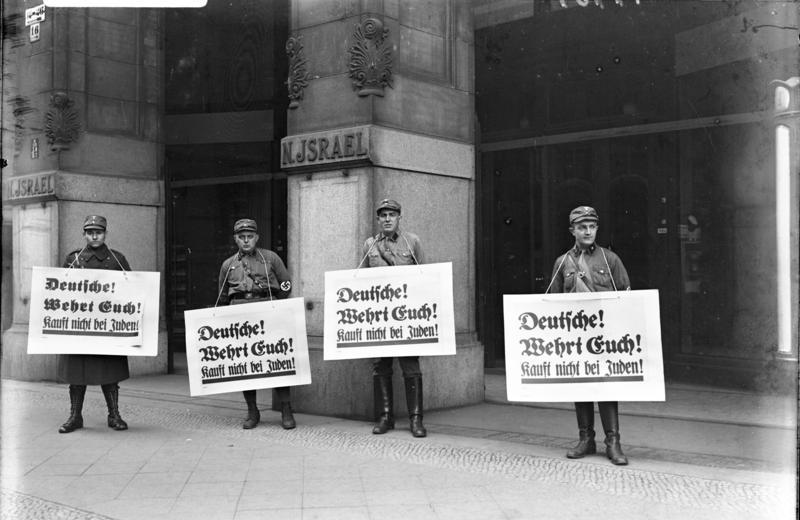
Nazi SA paramilitaries outside the store on April 1, 1933, holding signs: "Germans! Defend yourselves! Don't buy from Jews!" (Deutsche! Wehrt Euch! Kauft nicht bei Juden!)

At 10 a.m. on 1 April 1933, Nazi SA paramilitaries (Sturmabteilung) positioned themselves outside Jewish-owned businesses all over Germany to deter customers. Stormtroopers stood next to the main doors of the department store on Alexanderplatz, holding placards with the words: "Germans! Defend yourselves! Don't buy from Jews" (Deutsche! Wehrt Euch! Kauft nicht bei Juden!).

The building was ransacked and set on fire during the Kristallnacht on 10 November 1938, during which thousands of Jewish homes and businesses were ransacked or set alight, though firemen were able to put out the blaze in this department store. Later that year the company was handed over by the Nazis to the non-Jewish Emil Köster AG, and in 1939 it reopened as Das Haus im Zentrum, its "Aryanization" complete, according to the Israel family's papers. The family helped most of the store's Jewish employees, especially their children, leave Germany before the war began.

The home of Richard Israel, son of Moritz Israel, a previous partner in the store, was also taken by the Nazis. Schloss Schulzendorf was in East Berlin after World War II but in 1993 it was repossessed by the German government and returned to descendants of the Israel family.

== After the takeover ==
Following the takeover of the store, Wilfrid Israel, who had run the business with his brother, emigrated to England, where he took up a research position at Balliol College, Oxford. From there, he tried to establish contact with the German underground through Sir Stafford Cripps, Britain's foreign minister, and organized ship transports for Jewish children escaping from Europe. He died in 1943 along with the actor Leslie Howard, when their civilian plane BOAC Flight 777 was shot down by the Luftwaffe over the Bay of Biscay.

The store was very badly damaged during the bombing of Berlin in World War II, and its ruins were removed in the 1950s.

The store was situated in what became East Berlin, East Germany, a country which did not provide reparations to Jews for Nazi-era forced take-overs of their businesses. Thus the Israel family, the previous owners, began to receive compensation for their financial losses only after the Fall of the Berlin Wall in 1989 and German reunification.
