= William Horberg =

American film producer

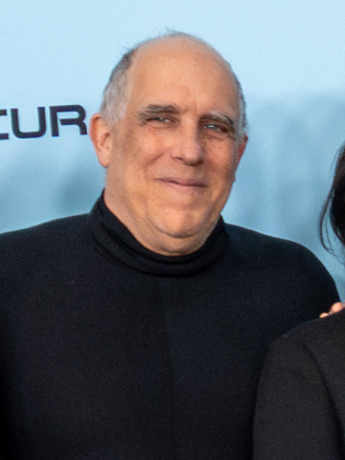
- Horberg in 2025
- Born: Chicago, Illinois, U.S.
- Education: Latin School of Chicago
- Occupation: Film producer

William Horberg is an American film producer and chair emeritus of the Producers Guild of America on the East coast. He is executive producer of The Queen's Gambit, a television miniseries released on Netflix for streaming on October 23, 2020. Some of Horberg's films include Anthony Minghella's adaptations of the novels The Talented Mr. Ripley and Cold Mountain. He also produced the Fallen Angels series for Showtime from 1993 to 1995.

== Early career ==
Horberg was born in Chicago, Illinois, where, in his first venture into film, he owned and operated the downtown repertory Sandburg Movie Theatre from 1979 to 1981. Earlier, he graduated high school from the Latin School of Chicago in 1976.

He moved into production starting his company, FutureVision, Inc., and was a producer on Cheap Trick: Live At ChicagoFest for MTV, Chicago Blues, a 13-part series featuring legendary blues performers for subscription TV, and was an Associate Producer on Miami Blues, and Executive Producer on A Rage in Harlem for Miramax Films.

Horberg began his career in 1987 as a creative executive at Paramount Pictures and later a Senior Vice President of Production. While at Paramount he oversaw the development and production of such films as Ghost, The Naked Gun 2½: The Smell of Fear, Dead Again, Regarding Henry, Soapdish, The Addams Family and The Godfather Part III.

In 1993, Horberg joined producer/director Sydney Pollack's company, Mirage, where he produced such films as Cold Mountain based on the best-selling novel by Charles Frazier, The Talented Mr. Ripley, based on the novel by Patricia Highsmith, The Quiet American based on the novel by Graham Greene, Heaven and Searching for Bobby Fischer, the directorial debut of Oscar-winning screenwriter (Schindler's List) Steven Zaillian.

During that time, he also created and produced the Showtime anthology series Fallen Angels which featured Tom Hanks, Tom Cruise, Steven Soderbergh and Alfonso Cuaron. He also produced the HBO film Poodle Springs based on the unfinished novel by Raymond Chandler and adapted by Tom Stoppard, along with Charlie Countryman.

== Later career ==
In 2005, Horberg became President of Production at Sidney Kimmel Entertainment, where he produced or executive produced Talk to Me, Death at a Funeral, Married Life, Lars and the Real Girl, Synecdoche, New York the directorial debut of Oscar-winning screenwriter Charlie Kaufman, The Kite Runner based on the best-selling book by Khaled Hosseini, and Milk. Most recently he founded an independent company, Wonderful Films, which in 2010 co-produced Death at a Funeral and Don't Be Afraid of the Dark. He also announced plans to co-produce, with Marc Forster, the drama film Disconnect directed by Henry Alex Rubin.

== Filmography ==
He was a producer in all films unless otherwise noted.

=== Film ===
| Year | Film | Credit |
|---|---|---|
| 1990 | Miami Blues | Associate producer |
| 1991 | A Rage in Harlem | Executive producer |
| 1993 | Searching for Bobby Fischer | |
| 1998 | Sliding Doors | |
| 1999 | The Talented Mr. Ripley | |
| 2001 | Blow Dry | |
| 2002 | Heaven | |
| 2002 | The Quiet American | |
| 2003 | Cold Mountain | |
| 2007 | Death at a Funeral | Executive producer |
| 2007 | Breach | Executive producer |
| 2007 | Talk to Me | Executive producer |
| 2007 | Charlie Bartlett | Executive producer |
| 2007 | Married Life | Executive producer |
| 2007 | Lars and the Real Girl | Executive producer |
| 2007 | The Kite Runner | |
| 2008 | Synecdoche, New York | Executive producer |
| 2008 | Management | Executive producer |
| 2008 | Milk | Executive producer |
| 2009 | Adventureland | Executive producer |
| 2010 | Death at a Funeral | |
| 2010 | Don't Be Afraid of the Dark | Executive producer |
| 2012 | Disconnect | |
| 2013 | Charlie Countryman | |
| 2013 | In Secret | |
| 2013 | Black Nativity | |
| 2015 | Parched | Co-executive producer |
| 2016 | The Promise | |
| 2017 | Crash Pad | |
| 2019 | The Burnt Orange Heresy | |
| 2021 | Flag Day | |
| 2023 | The Monk and the Gun | Executive producer |
| 2023 | Ezra | |
| 2023 | In Restless Dreams: The Music of Paul Simon | Executive producer |
| 2025 | Couture | |
| 2025 | The History of Sound | Executive producer |
| 2025 | An Eye for an Eye | Executive producer |
| 2025 | Orwell: 2+2=5 | Executive producer |
| 2025 | Teenage Wasteland | Executive producer |
| 2025 | Last Days | Executive producer |
| 2026 | Musk | Executive producer |
| TBA | Useful Idiots | |

As an actor

| Year | Film | Role |
|---|---|---|
| 2013 | Black Nativity | Church Band Pianist |

Thanks

| Year | Film | Role |
|---|---|---|
| 1995 | Sense and Sensibility | Thanks |
| 2008 | Killshot | Thanks |
| 2009 | The Messenger | Special thanks |

=== Television ===
| Year | Title | Credit | Notes |
|---|---|---|---|
| 1993−95 | Fallen Angels | | |
| 1998 | Muddy Waters at Chicagofest | | Documentary |
| 1998 | Poodle Springs | Executive producer | Television film |
| 2020 | The Queen's Gambit | Executive producer | |
| TBA | Flavia de Luce | Co-producer | |

As writer

| Year | Title |
|---|---|
| 1993−95 | Fallen Angels |

As an actor

| Year | Title | Role |
|---|---|---|
| 2020 | The Queen's Gambit | Toby |

Soundtrack

| Year | Title | Role | Notes |
|---|---|---|---|
| 2020 | The Queen's Gambit | Performer: "I Can't Remember Love" Writer: "I Can't Remember Love" | Uncredited |

== Personal life ==
He lives in New York with his wife, Cuban-born artist, Elsa Mora, and their children.
