= Hollywood Music in Media Award for Best Original Score in a TV Show/Limited Series =

American media music award

The Hollywood Music in Media Award for Best Main Title Theme – TV Show/Limited Series is one of the awards given annually to composers working in the television industry by the Hollywood Music in Media Awards (HMMA). It is presented to the musicians who have composed the best score, written specifically for a television series, or limited series. The award was first given in 2014, during the fifth annual awards.

== Winners and nominees ==
=== 2010s ===
Best Original Score – TV Show/Digital Streaming Series

Year	Series	Composer	Network
(2014); 5th
(2014); 5th	Cosmos: A Spacetime Odyssey	Alan Silvestri	Fox
(2014); 5th	Game of Thrones	Ramin Djawadi	HBO
(2014); 5th	The Knick	Cliff Martinez	Cinemax
(2014); 5th	Matador	Juan Carlos Rodríguez	El Rey Network
(2014); 5th	Orange Is the New Black	Scott Doherty, Brandon Jay & Gwendolyn Sanford	Netflix
(2014); 5th	Parallels	Corey Allen Jackson	Netflix
(2014); 5th	True Detective	T Bone Burnett	HBO
(2015); 6th
(2015); 6th	House of Cards	Jeff Beal	Netflix
(2015); 6th	Empire	Fil Eisler	Fox
(2015); 6th	Narcos	Pedro Bromfman	Netflix
(2015); 6th	Outlander	Bear McCreary	Starz
(2015); 6th	Penny Dreadful	Abel Korzeniowski	Showtime

Best Original Score – TV Show/Miniseries

Year	Series	Composer	Network
(2016); 7th
(2016); 7th	Roots	Alex Heffes and Phillip Miller	History
(2016); 7th	All the Way	James Newton Howard	HBO
(2016); 7th	Fargo	Jeff Russo	FX
(2016); 7th	Minority Report	Sean Callery	Fox
(2016); 7th	Mr. Robot	Mac Quayle	USA
(2016); 7th	Stranger Things	Michael Stein & Kyle Dixon	Netflix

Best Original Score – TV Show/Limited Series

Year	Series	Composer	Network
(2017); 8th
(2017); 8th	Underground	Laura Karpman & Raphael Saadiq	WGN America
(2017); 8th	BoJack Horseman	Jesse Novak	Netflix
(2017); 8th	The Crown	Rupert Gregson-Williams	Netflix
(2017); 8th	Fargo	Jeff Russo	FX
(2017); 8th	Get Shorty	Antonio Sánchez	Epix
(2017); 8th	Graves	Mateo Messina	Epix
(2017); 8th	Queen Sugar	Meshell Ndegeocello	OWN
(2017); 8th	Transparent	Dustin O'Halloran	Amazon
(2018); 9th
(2018); 9th	Succession	Nicholas Britell	HBO
(2018); 9th	Black Mirror: USS Callister	Daniel Pemberton	Netflix
(2018); 9th	Castle Rock	Thomas Newman and Chris Westlake	Hulu
(2018); 9th	Howards End	Nico Muhly	Starz
(2018); 9th	Once Upon a Time	Mark Isham, Cindy O'Connor, Michael D. Simon	ABC
(2018); 9th	Westworld	Ramin Djawadi	HBO
(2019); 10th
(2019); 10th	When They See Us	Kris Bowers	Netflix
(2019); 10th	Chernobyl	Hildur Guðnadóttir	HBO
(2019); 10th	Star Trek: Discovery	Jeff Russo	CBS All Access
(2019); 10th	Succession	Nicholas Britell	HBO
(2019); 10th	This Is Us	Siddhartha Khosla	NBC

=== 2020s ===
Year	Series	Supervisor(s)	Network
(2020); 11th
(2020); 11th	The Queen's Gambit	Carlos Rafael Rivera	Netflix
(2020); 11th	Bridgerton	Kris Bowers	Netflix
(2020); 11th	The Crown	Martin Phipps	Netflix
(2020); 11th	Lovecraft Country	Laura Karpman & Raphael Saadiq	HBO
(2020); 11th	Star Trek: Discovery	Jeff Russo	CBS All Access
(2020); 11th	Ted Lasso	Tom Howe & Marcus Mumford	Apple TV+
(2021); 12th
(2021); 12th	Squid Game	Jung Jae-il	Netflix
(2021); 12th	Halston	Nathan Barr	Netflix
(2021); 12th	Loki	Natalie Holt	Disney+
(2021); 12th	Maid	Chris Stracey & Este Haim	
(2021); 12th	The Morning Show	Carter Burwell	Apple TV+
(2021); 12th	Physical	Isabella Summers	Apple TV+
(2021); 12th	Ted Lasso	Tom Howe & Marcus Mumford	Apple TV+
(2021); 12th	WandaVision	Christophe Beck	Disney+
(2021); 12th	Who Killed Sara?	David Murillo	Netflix
(2022); 13th
(2022); 13th	1883	Brian Tyler & Breton Vivian	Paramount+
(2022); 13th	The Man Who Fell to Earth	Jeff Russo	Showtime
(2022); 13th	Yellowjackets	Craig Wedren & Anna Waronker	Showtime
(2022); 13th	Ice Age: Scrat Tales	Batu Sener	Disney+
(2022); 13th	The Lord of the Rings: The Rings of Power	Bear McCreary	Amazon Prime Video
(2022); 13th	Severance	Theodore Shapiro	Apple TV+
(2022); 13th	Obi-Wan Kenobi	Natalie Holt & John Williams	Disney+
(2023); 14th
(2023); 14th	Succession	Nicholas Britell	HBO
(2023); 14th	American Horror Stories: "Tapeworm"	Mac Quayle	FX on Hulu
(2023); 14th	Beef	Bobby Krlic	Netflix
(2023); 14th	Godfather of Harlem	Mark Isham	MGM+
(2023); 14th	Loki	Natalie Holt	Disney+
(2023); 14th	Silo	Atli Örvarsson	Apple TV+
(2023); 14th	Swagger	Terence Blanchard	Apple TV+
(2023); 14th	The Gilded Age	Harry Gregson-Williams & Rupert Gregson-Williams	HBO
(2024); 15th
(2024); 15th	Shōgun	Atticus Ross, Leopold Ross & Nick Chuba	FX/FX on Hulu
(2024); 15th	Disclaimer	Finneas O'Connell	Apple TV+
(2024); 15th	Feud: Capote vs. The Swans	Julia Newman	FX on Hulu
(2024); 15th	Masters of the Air	Blake Neely	Apple TV+
(2024); 15th	Shardlake	Alex Heffes	Disney+
(2024); 15th	Slow Horses	Daniel Pemberton & Toydrum	Apple TV+
(2024); 15th	The Tattooist of Auschwitz	Kara Talve & Hans Zimmer	Peacock
(2025); 16th
(2025); 16th	Severance	Theodore Shapiro	Apple TV+
(2025); 16th	Adolescence	Aaron May and David Ridley	Netflix
(2025); 16th	The Studio	Antonio Sánchez	Apple TV+
(2025); 16th	Andor	Brandon Roberts and Nicholas Britell	Disney+
(2025); 16th	Wednesday	Chris Bacon	Netflix
(2025); 16th	The Last of Us	David Fleming	HBO
(2025); 16th	Your Friends & Neighbors	Dominic Lewis	Apple TV+
(2025); 16th	Landman	Andrew Lockington	Paramount+
(2025); 16th	Chad Powers	Natalie Holt	Hulu
(2025); 16th	The Gilded Age	Harry Gregson-Williams and Rupert Gregson-Williams	HBO
(2026); 17th
(2026); 17th	Widow's Bay	David Fleming	Apple TV
(2026); 17th	A Knight of the Seven Kingdom	Dan Romer	HBO
(2026); 17th	The Lord of the Rings: The Rings of Power season 3	Bear McCreary	Amazon Prime Video
(2026); 17th	Slow Horses	Daniel Pemberton	Apple TV
(2026); 17th	Spider-Noir	Kris Bowers and Michael Dean Parsons	MGM+/Amazon Prime Video
(2026); 17th	Pluribus	Dave Porter	Apple TV
