= Matthew Dennis Lewis =

American actor

- Born: Harpursville, New York, U.S.
- Occupation: Actor
- Years active: 2012–present

Matthew Dennis Lewis is an American actor notable for appearing in the Netflix Western series Godless (2017) and chess prodigy series The Queen’s Gambit (2020).

He appears with his twin brother Russell Dennis Lewis in several shows.

== Early life ==
Matthew Dennis Lewis was born and raised in the town of Binghamton in the Southern Tier of New York and has three brothers, one of whom is fellow actor twin Russell. He worked at a tanning salon, as a fitness and swimwear model, before deciding to pursue acting. His brother Russ was already a student at an acting conservatory in New York City. Lewis moved to New York City and trained and competed in the martial art of Muay Thai. He has said having a martial arts background helped him secure parts. Lewis lived in New York City for six years before moving to Los Angeles where he currently (April 2020) resides and works. He has stated that he would have considered studying marine biology or kinesiology if he had not become an actor.

== Career ==
Lewis and his brother have played twins Seth and Steve Rhodes in the CBS series Blue Bloods (2019), and again as Charlie and Big Joe in the supernatural thriller Burning Shadow (2018), In 2017, Lewis and Russell had recurring roles as twin brothers Donnie and Daryl Devlin, in the Netflix Western series Godless (2017).

In 2020, they once again had recurring roles as Matt and Mike in the chess prodigy series The Queen’s Gambit (2020).

In 2022, Lewis and his brother Russell modelled for HUF magazine for a project named 'The King's Gambit'. They appeared together as the McPhail twins in an episode of Interview with the Vampire. Again in 2022, they played twins Colby and Carrington Reed in an episode of So Help Me Todd.

== Filmography ==
=== Film ===
Year	Title	Role
2014	Off the Grid	Matt
2016	Scripted (Short)	Chaz
2016	The Tale of a Pusher	Policeman
2016	Happy Hour (Short)	Sam
2017	For God and Country (Short)	Noah Adams
2018	Burning Shadow	Charlie
2019	D-Day: Battle of Omaha Beach	Robbins
2019	Midway	Frank O'Flaherty
2020	There's No Such Thing as Vampires	Cameron
2020	Sins Unveiled (Short)	Henry

=== Television ===
Year	Title	Role	Notes
2012	On the Case with Paula Zahn	Kevin Green	Season 7 - Episode 2 - "Painful Memories"
2013	Couples Who Kill	Casey Ledbetter	Season 6 - Episode 8 - "A Mother's Worst Nightmare"
2013	My Boring Life	Man	1 Episode - Tuesday
2013	Scorned: Love Kills	Peter Giffin / J.R. Taylor	Season 2 - Episode 2 - "Blood on the Boardwalk" & 12 - "Addicted to Sex"
2014	Murder Book (TV Series documentary)	Carson Shack	Episode - "Snake in the Grass"
2015	Unusual Suspects (TV Series documentary)	Jesse Coolridge	1 Episode - "Nightmare Field"
2016	Married with Secrets (TV Series documentary)	DJ Gliniewicz	Episode - "A Darker Shade of Blue"
2016	Chasing Foxes (TV Series)	Wynn Bishop (2016)	
2017	Godless	Donnie Devlin	7 episodes
2019	Blue Bloods	Seth Rhodes	Season 9 - Episode 21 – "Identity"
2019	I Am the Night	Officer Jennings	Episode 3 - "Dark Flower"
2020	The Queen’s Gambit	Mike	4 episodes - "End Game", "Middle Game", "Doubled Pawns", "Exchanges"
2022	Interview with the Vampire	Matthew McPhail	S1 episode 7 - "The Thing Lay Still"
2022	So Help Me Todd	Colby Reed	S1 episode 8 - "Big Bang Theories"
