= Dead Again =

1991 neo-noir romantic thriller film by Kenneth Branagh

- Theatrical release poster
- Directed by: Kenneth Branagh
- Written by: Scott Frank
- Produced by: Lindsay Doran
- Starring: Kenneth Branagh; Andy García; Derek Jacobi; Hanna Schygulla; Emma Thompson
- Cinematography: Matthew F. Leonetti
- Edited by: Peter E. Berger
- Music by: Patrick Doyle
- Distributed by: Paramount Pictures
- Release date: August 23, 1991 (United States)
- Running time: 108 minutes
- Countries: United States; United Kingdom
- Language: English
- Budget: $15 million
- Box office: $38 million (United States)

Dead Again is a 1991 neo-noir romantic thriller film directed by Kenneth Branagh and written by Scott Frank. It stars Branagh and Emma Thompson, with Andy García, Derek Jacobi, Hanna Schygulla, Wayne Knight, and Robin Williams appearing in supporting roles.

A woman with amnesia is taken in by a Los Angeles orphanage, which enlists private eye Mike Church to track down her identity. However, a past life connection they may share could endanger their lives.

Dead Again was a moderate box-office success, and received positive reviews from the majority of critics. Jacobi was nominated for a BAFTA Award for Best Actor in a Supporting Role, and Patrick Doyle, who composed the film's music, was nominated for a Golden Globe for Best Original Score.

== Plot ==
Newspapers detail the 1948 murder of Margaret Strauss, who was stabbed during a robbery; her anklet is missing. Her husband, composer Roman Strauss, is found guilty of the crime and condemned to death. Before his execution, Roman is visited by reporter Gray Baker. Asked if he killed Margaret, Roman appears to whisper something in Baker's ear. Baker does not disclose Roman's answer.

Forty-three years later, private detective Mike Church investigates the identity of a woman who has appeared at the orphanage where he grew up. She has amnesia, cannot speak, and has nightmares. Mike takes her in and asks his friend Pete Dugan to publish her picture and his contact info. Antiques dealer and hypnotist Franklyn Madson approaches Mike, suggesting that hypnosis may help her to recover her memory.

When the session is unsuccessful, Madson suggests that they experiment with past life regression. Mike is skeptical, but the woman details Margaret and Roman's lives in the third person. When the session ends, she can speak but still has amnesia. Mike and the woman bear a striking resemblance to Roman and Margaret.

Mike nicknames the woman "Grace" and falls in love with her. A man named Doug appears, claiming she is his fiancée Katherine, but Mike discovers that he is lying and chases him off. When hypnotized, Grace remembers that Roman suffered from writer's block and was broke, despite his earlier wealth. He believes that Margaret is flirting with Baker. Margaret cannot convince him that she is faithful and catches Frankie, the son of their housekeeper Inga, looking through her jewelry box. She asks Roman to dismiss Inga, but Roman refuses, saying she had saved his life in Nazi Germany.

Grace sees Mike standing over Margaret with scissors and is convinced he intends to kill her. He insists that he would never hurt her, but when he accidentally calls her "Margaret", he agrees to let Madson regress him. During his regression, he realizes that he was actually Margaret (and that Grace was actually Roman), but is unable to tell Madson or Grace.

Pete tells Mike that he has identified Grace as artist Amanda Sharp. It is discovered that she lost her memory after getting mugged. Grace/Amanda, still afraid of Mike, accompanies Pete and Madson to her apartment; her artwork focuses on scissors. Madson gives her a gun to protect herself.

Mike visits Gray Baker in a nursing home and asks him about Roman's secret. He insists that Roman said nothing to him but rather leaned over and kissed him. Baker is convinced that Roman did not kill his wife and urges Mike to find Inga, who might know what truly happened. When Baker tells Mike that Inga and Frankie started an antiques shop, Mike realizes that Madson is actually Frankie.

Mike breaks into Madson's shop, where he finds and questions Inga. She reveals that in 1948, she declared her love to Roman, but he rebuffed her. Frankie blamed Margaret for his mother's unhappiness, killed her with scissors, and stole her anklet. Roman was found covered in his wife's blood and holding the murder weapon.

After Roman's execution, Inga took Frankie to London, where he learned about hypnotherapy and past-life regression. After returning to Los Angeles, Frankie was convinced that Margaret's spirit would seek revenge. Seeing Grace/Amanda's photo in the newspaper, he knew that she had returned. He hired the actor Doug to separate Mike and Grace/Amanda until he could kill her. Inga apologizes for her role in Margaret's death and gives Mike the anklet. After Mike leaves to find Grace/Amanda, Frankie smothers Inga with a pillow.

Mike tries to tell Grace/Amanda the truth. Terrified, she shoots him. Madson arrives and reveals that he is Frankie. He puts the scissors that he used to kill Margaret in Mike's hand and tries to make it look like Grace/Amanda killed him. Mike revives and stabs Madson in the leg with the scissors. Pete arrives, misconstrues the scene, and tackles Mike. As Madson reaches for the pistol, Grace/Amanda stabs him in the back with the scissors. In a rage, Madson charges Mike, but Mike positions Grace/Amanda's scissor sculpture so that Madson impales himself.

== Cast ==
- Kenneth Branagh as Mike Church/Roman Strauss
- Emma Thompson as "Grace"/Amanda Sharp/Margaret Strauss
- Andy García as Gray Baker
- Derek Jacobi as Franklyn Madson
- Wayne Knight as "Piccolo" Pete Dugan
- Robin Williams as Dr. Cozy Carlisle
- Hanna Schygulla as Inga
- Campbell Scott as Doug O’Malley
- Jo Anderson as Sister Madeleine/Masquerade Party Guest
- Lois Hall as Sister Constance
- Richard Easton as Father Timothy
- Gregor Hesse as Frankie
- Obba Babatundé as Sid
- Vasek Simek as Otto Kline
- Christine Ebersole as Lydia Larson
- Raymond Cruz as supermarket clerk
- Miriam Margolyes as hypnotic subject in shop (uncredited)

== Production ==
Kenneth Branagh said he was compelled to make Dead Again the moment he read Scott Frank's script as its affection for a time when movies were a bit more "audacious", particularly when it came to the Alfred Hitchcock films Branagh grew up watching on television such as Vertigo and Notorious, resonated with him. Stylistically, Branagh modeled Dead Again not only on Hitchock's filmography, but also Citizen Kane and the works of Edgar Allan Poe as he wanted the film's plot involving outlandish elements like reincarnation to have a gothic look removed from reality. In order to achieve the right tone, Branagh directed his composer Patrick Doyle to model the score off the works Bernard Herrmann scored for Hitchcock's films, something big and bold and melodramatic.

=== Post-production ===
According to Branagh, the film went through five different edits over the course of six months as he struggled with finding the right balance of humor, suspense, and romance during test screenings with some cuts coming out too silly while others were either too weird or bleak. Paramount Pictures grew nervous over Branagh's usage of black and white for the flashbacks with Branagh crediting Sydney Pollack for persuading Paramount on his behalf to allow them. Branagh did however credit Paramount with their patience as despite the studio's apprehension when the film didn't work right away, they were patient enough to give him the time he needed to find the right combination.

Dead Again is an international co-production between the United States and the United Kingdom. According to the director's commentary on the DVD, the movie was filmed entirely in color. After test screenings, it was decided to use black-and-white for the "past" sequences to help clear audience confusion. The final frame, when the mystery is solved, blooms from black-and-white to color.

== Release ==
Dead Again was released August 23, 1991, in the United States, and October 25, 1991, in the United Kingdom. It was entered into the 42nd Berlin International Film Festival in February 1992.

=== Home media ===
The film was released on VHS on March 12, 1992, by Paramount Home Entertainment. It proved successful in the video rental market, becoming the 13th most-rented film in the United States for 1992. It was released on DVD June 27, 2000, through Paramount Home Entertainment. The DVD special features include two audio commentaries and a theatrical trailer.

It was released for the first time on Blu-ray October 5, 2021, on the film's 30th anniversary.

== Reception ==
=== Critical response ===
Dead Again was well received by most critics. On Rotten Tomatoes, it has an approval rating of 82%, based on reviews from 55 critics. The consensus reads: "Even if the somewhat convoluted plot falls apart upon close inspection, Dead Again proves Kenneth Branagh has a solid knack for enjoyable pulp." On Metacritic, the film has a weighted average score of 66 out of 100, based on reviews from 19 critics. Audiences surveyed by CinemaScore gave the film a grade of "A-" on scale of A+ to F.

Chicago Sun-Times film critic, Roger Ebert, gave the film a glowing four-star review, drawing comparisons to the works of Orson Welles and Alfred Hitchcock, stating, "Dead Again is Kenneth Branagh once again demonstrating that he has a natural flair for bold theatrical gesture. If Henry V, the first film he directed and starred in, caused people to compare him to Olivier, Dead Again will inspire comparisons to Welles and Hitchcock - and the Olivier of Hitchcock's Rebecca. I do not suggest Branagh is already as great a director as Welles and Hitchcock, although he has a good start in that direction. What I mean is that his spirit, his daring, is in the same league. He is not interested in making timid movies."

James Berardinelli also gave the film a four-star review, praising Branagh's direction and all levels of the production, from the screenplay by Scott Frank to Patrick Doyle's score, stating, "...Branagh has combined all of these cinematic elements into an achievement that rivals Hitchcock's best work and stands out as one of the most intriguing and memorable thrillers of the 1990s."

Peter Travers of Rolling Stone viewed the film negatively, praising some elements of Branagh's direction, while criticizing the romance, saying, "In his efforts to crowd the screen with character and incident, Branagh cheats on the one element that might have given resonance to the mystery: the love story. Branagh and Thompson (married in real life) are sublime actors, but they never develop a convincing ardor as either couple. How could they when the director is so busy playing tricks? Dead Again isn't a disaster, merely a miscalculation from a prodigious talent who has forgotten that you squeeze the life out of romance when you don't give it space to breathe."

Vincent Canby of The New York Times gave the film a lukewarm review, calling it "a big, convoluted, entertainingly dizzy romantic mystery melodrama", and concluding, "Dead Again is eventually a lot simpler than it pretends to be. The explanation of the mystery is a rather commonplace letdown, but probably nothing short of mass murder could successfully top the baroque buildup. In this way, too, the film is faithful to its antecedents, while still being a lot of fun."

In 2016, Jason Bailey at Flavorwire repeated Roger Ebert's initial directorial comparisons, writing that, "Dead Again is one of the most Hitchcockian thrillers this side of De Palma, with easily traceable influences of Olivier-fronted Rebecca (in the creepy, needy housekeeper), Psycho (the mysterious old mother in the next room), Dial M for Murder (the scissors as murder weapon), and Spellbound (the therapeutic elements, plus a quickie reference to Salvador Dalí, who advised on that film’s dream sequences)."

=== Box office ===
Dead Again grossed $3,479,395 during its opening weekend, playing on 450 screens. It grossed more than $38 million by the end of its theatrical run.

=== Accolades ===
Award	Category	Recipients	Result
British Academy Film Awards	Best Actor in a Supporting Role	Derek Jacobi	Nominated
Berlin International Film Festival	Golden Bear	Kenneth Branagh	Nominated
Edgar Allan Poe Awards	Best Motion Picture Screenplay	Scott Frank	Nominated
Golden Globe Awards	Best Original Score	Patrick Doyle	Nominated
Young Artist Award	Best Young Actor Co-starring in a Motion Picture	Gregor Hesse	Nominated

== Media ==
Dead Again was one of several influences on the 1999 conceptual album, Metropolis pt. 2: Scenes From a Memory, by the American progressive metal band, Dream Theater.
