= The Queen's Gambit (miniseries) =

2020 American television miniseries

- Promotional poster
- Genre: Coming-of-age; Period drama
- Created by: Scott Frank; Allan Scott
- Based on: The Queen's Gambit by Walter Tevis
- Written by: Scott Frank
- Directed by: Scott Frank
- Starring: Anya Taylor-Joy; Bill Camp; Moses Ingram; Isla Johnston; Christiane Seidel; Rebecca Root; Chloe Pirrie; Akemnji Ndifornyen; Marielle Heller; Harry Melling; Patrick Kennedy; Jacob Fortune-Lloyd; Thomas Brodie-Sangster; Marcin Dorociński
- Music by: Carlos Rafael Rivera
- Country of origin: United States
- Original language: English
- No. of episodes: 7

Production
- Executive producers: William Horberg; Allan Scott; Scott Frank
- Producers: Marcus Loges; Mick Aniceto
- Cinematography: Steven Meizler
- Editor: Michelle Tesoro
- Running time: 46–67 minutes
- Production companies: Flitcraft Ltd; Wonderful Films

Original release
- Network: Netflix
- Release: October 23, 2020

The Queen's Gambit is a 2020 American coming-of-age period drama television miniseries based on the 1983 eponymous novel by Walter Tevis. The title refers to the "Queen's Gambit", a chess opening. The series was written and directed by Scott Frank, who created it with Allan Scott, who owns the rights to the book. Beginning in the mid-1950s and proceeding into the 1960s, the story follows the life of Beth Harmon (Anya Taylor-Joy), a fictional American chess prodigy on her rise to the top of the chess world while struggling with a drug and alcohol addiction.

Netflix released The Queen's Gambit on October 23, 2020. Within four weeks it became Netflix's most-watched scripted miniseries, making it Netflix's top program in 63 countries. The series received critical acclaim, with particular praise for Taylor-Joy's performance, the cinematography, and production values. It also received a positive response from the chess community for its often accurate depictions of high-level chess, and data suggests that it increased public interest in the game.

The Queen's Gambit won eleven Primetime Emmy Awards, including Outstanding Limited or Anthology Series, becoming the first show on a streaming service to win the category. The series also won two Golden Globe Awards: Best Limited Series or Television Film and Best Actress – Miniseries or Television Film for Taylor-Joy. She also won the Screen Actors Guild Award for Outstanding Performance by a Female Actor in a Miniseries or Television Movie.

== Overview ==
The Queen's Gambit follows the life of an orphan chess prodigy, Elizabeth Harmon, during her quest to become an elite chess player while struggling with emotional problems, drugs and alcohol dependency. The title of the series refers to a chess opening of the same name. The story is set in the mid-1950s and 1960s.

In the 1950s in Lexington, Kentucky, nine-year-old Beth, having lost her mother in a car crash, is taken to an orphanage where she is taught chess by the building's custodian, Mr. Shaibel. As was common at the time, the orphanage dispenses daily tranquilizer pills to the girls to "balance their disposition", which turns into an addiction for Beth. She quickly becomes a strong chess player due to her visualization skills. A few years later, Beth is adopted by childless suburban couple Alma and Allston Wheatley.

As she adjusts to her new home, Beth enters a chess tournament and wins despite having no prior experience in competitive chess. Alma is initially resistant to Beth's interest in chess, but after Beth wins a tournament with a substantial cash prize, Alma fully supports her adoptive daughter's sojourns to enter chess competitions. Beth develops friendships with several people, including former Kentucky State Champion Harry Beltik, United States National Champion Benny Watts, and journalist and fellow player D.L. Townes.

As Beth rises to the top of the chess world and reaps the financial benefits of her success, her drug and alcohol dependency worsens. With help from her oldest friend Jolene, with whom she grew up in the orphanage, she prepares for a major international chess tournament against the world's best players in Moscow.

== Cast and characters ==
=== Main ===
- Anya Taylor-Joy as Beth Harmon, an orphan who matures into a competitive young adult fueled by a desire to become the greatest chess player in the world while masking a growing addiction to the drugs and alcohol that allow her to function.
  - Isla Johnston as nine-year-old Beth
  - Annabeth Kelly as five-year-old Beth
- Bill Camp as William Shaibel, the custodian at the Methuen Home for Girls and an experienced chess player who teaches Beth how to play the game at age 9
- Moses Ingram as Jolene, a rebellious teenager at the Methuen Home who becomes Beth's closest childhood friend. She secures a Physical Education scholarship to attend Kentucky State University but switches her major to Political Science, later working as a paralegal and saving for law school. Jolene utilizes her savings for law school to fund Beth's travel to Russia.
- Christiane Seidel as Helen Deardorff, director of Methuen Home for Girls
- Rebecca Root as Miss Lonsdale, the chaplain and choir director at Methuen
- Chloe Pirrie as Alice Harmon, Beth's deceased mother (seen only in flashbacks) who earned a Ph.D. in mathematics at Cornell University before experiencing a downward spiral in her mental health
- Akemnji Ndifornyen as Mr. Fergusson, the orderly at Methuen, who among other roles administers state-mandated pills to the girls
- Marielle Heller as Alma Wheatley, who with her husband Allston adopts Beth as a young teenager and later acts as a manager for Beth's chess career. Alma's biological child died sometime before Beth's adoption, and she develops a worsening alcoholism that begins to influence Beth.
- Harry Melling as Harry Beltik, Kentucky State Champion, whom Beth defeats in her first tournament
- Patrick Kennedy as Allston Wheatley, Alma's husband, a travelling salesman and Beth's estranged adoptive father
- Jacob Fortune-Lloyd as D.L. Townes, a chess player and journalist who befriends Beth and with whom she is infatuated, but whom she later finds to be gay
- Thomas Brodie-Sangster as Benny Watts, a brash young New Yorker who is the reigning United States Chess Champion, later Beth's mentor, lover and friend
- Marcin Dorociński as Vasily Borgov, Soviet World Champion and Beth's biggest challenge

=== Recurring ===
- Sergio Di Zio as Beth's biological father
- Dolores Carbonari as Margaret, Beth's classmate at Fairfield high School and bully
- Eloise Webb as Annette Packer, a friendly teenager who becomes Beth's first tournament opponent
- Matthew and Russell Dennis Lewis as Matt and Mike, twin brothers, students at the University of Cincinnati who serve as event organisers and tournament directors at Beth's first tournament and go on to become her friends
- Richard Waugh as Mr. Bradley, a local newsagent
- Janina Elkin as Borgov's wife, who is also his interpreter
- Max Krause as Arthur Levertov, a grandmaster and friend of Benny's who assists Beth with her training
- Ryan Wichert as Hilton Wexler, a strong player and chess problem enthusiast, friend of Benny

=== Guest ===
- Jonjo O'Neill as Mr. Ganz, a teacher and coach of the local high school chess team who invites a young Beth to play at his school
- Louis Ashbourne Serkis as Georgi Girev, a 13-year-old Soviet chess prodigy
- Millie Brady as Cleo, a French Parisian model who had a brief affair with Benny. She quickly befriends Beth.
- Bruce Pandolfini as Ed Spencer, a tournament director
- John Schwab as Mr. Booth, Beth's minder from the State Department
- Marcus Loges as Luchenko, a veteran former world chess champion and still a formidable player
- Sophie McShera as Miss Graham

== Episodes ==
No.	Title	Directed by	Teleplay by	Original release date
1	"Openings"	Scott Frank	Scott Frank	October 23, 2020
Elizabeth Harmon is orphaned at age nine when her mother dies in a car crash on New Circle Road in Lexington, Kentucky. She is taken to Methuen Home for Girls, where the children are given tranquilizing pills to make them more compliant. While dusting erasers in the basement, Beth discovers the custodian, Mr. Shaibel, studying chess on his own. After repeated requests and demonstrating that she has already learned how the pieces move by observing him, he reluctantly agrees to teach her the game. She improves quickly, thanks to her spatial intelligence and tranquilizer abuse, which allow her to focus and visualize chess games on the ceiling above her bed. When she is able to beat him regularly, Shaibel introduces Beth to the local high school chess club teacher, Mr. Ganz, whom she also beats. Ganz invites her to play a simultaneous exhibition against his entire club. After the state passes a law outlawing the use of tranquilizers on children, Beth begins to suffer from withdrawal. Given tranquilizer pills by her friend Jolene, Beth beats Ganz's entire class easily. Still suffering from withdrawal, she is caught stealing a jar of the tranquilizers and passes out after swallowing several mouthfuls of pills.
2	"Exchanges"	Scott Frank	Scott Frank	October 23, 2020
Beth is adopted as a teenager by Lexington couple Alma and Allston Wheatley. Alma is unhappy, while Allston is emotionally distant and frequently absent. At her new high school, Beth is bullied by the popular girls from the "Apple Pi Club" for her drab clothes and intelligence. Beth steals tranquilizers from her mother and again begins to visualize chess positions on the ceiling. She also steals a chess magazine and learns about the upcoming Kentucky State Championship. Short of money, she writes to Mr. Shaibel, who sends her $5 for the entrance fee. She surprises the organizers by cruising through her early games, and develops a crush on a young man named Townes, who she plays against shortly after. After their game, Beth becomes flustered when she learns she has started menstruating, though she receives help from her first round opponent Annette Packer in the bathroom, and from Allston once she arrives home. After the second day of the tournament, Beth comes home to find that Allston has deserted her and Alma, but the two women agree to lie so Beth can stay. During her final game of the tournament against state champion Harry Beltik, Beth becomes flustered by his late arrival and runs to the restroom to reprimand herself, after which she regains composure and takes a tranquilizer to help win the game. Alma takes an interest in chess after seeing Beth's winnings and plans to take Beth to a tournament in Cincinnati.
3	"Doubled Pawns"	Scott Frank	Scott Frank	October 23, 2020
Beth wins the tournament in Cincinnati. She continues to skip school while traveling to tournaments and quickly gains national recognition for her achievements. She also begins dressing more stylishly as her winnings increase. At school, Beth is invited to a meeting of the "Apple Pi Club" by the girls who had initially shunned her. She soon realizes she has nothing in common with them and, stealing a bottle of gin, escapes back home. In 1966, Beth heads to Las Vegas for the U.S. Open where she is reunited with Townes, now a journalist covering the event for the Lexington newspaper. They return to his hotel room where Townes takes pictures of her. The two play chess and share a brief, intimate moment, but are interrupted by Townes's roommate, who Beth suspects is also his boyfriend. Beth runs into the current U.S. national champion, Benny Watts, who points out an error in her game against Beltik. Beth is taken aback and replays her earlier game, losing her confidence. She experiences her first professional loss against Benny the next day and they finish the tournament as co-champions.
4	"Middle Game"	Scott Frank	Scott Frank	October 23, 2020
Beth takes night classes in Russian at a local college. She attends a party where she smokes marijuana and has sex with one of the students. Left alone in the empty apartment for the weekend, she indulges herself with more alcohol and drugs. After graduating from high school, Beth travels to an international tournament in Mexico City with Alma. Beth competes against several international players, including 13-year-old Soviet prodigy Georgi Girev, whom she defeats in a tough game lasting two days. While in a crowded elevator, Beth overhears a discussion between Soviet world champion Vasily Borgov and two associates about her playing style and potential weaknesses. Beth then plays Borgov and loses to him in an intense game after he surprises her with an offbeat opening. Back in the hotel room, Beth discovers Alma has died of suspected hepatitis, likely worsened by her excessive drinking. Beth manages to contact Allston in Denver, who wants nothing to do with the burial arrangements. However, he agrees to let Beth keep the house. Beth buys more tranquilizers from a pharmacy before flying home to arrange Alma's burial.
5	"Fork"	Scott Frank	Scott Frank	October 23, 2020
Beth returns home to Kentucky and reconnects with Beltik, who is attending college and has romantic feelings for her. At Beth's suggestion, he moves into Alma's house to accompany the now lonely Beth. The two spend time training and occasionally having sex until Beltik realizes Beth's obsession with chess will always overshadow any relationship they may have. The two part ways, as Beltik admits his passion for the game has waned. Beth travels to the 1967 U.S. Championship in Ohio, where she reunites with Benny Watts. The evening before they are scheduled to face each other in the final game, Benny challenges Beth to several rounds of speed chess. An experienced speed chess hustler, he beats her consistently. The next day, however, Beth defeats Benny to become the U.S. champion. The two discuss Beth's future in international competition. Benny, recognizing that Beth needs both a role model and a trainer, invites Beth to train for the Paris Invitational with him in New York City.
6	"Adjournment"	Scott Frank	Scott Frank	October 23, 2020
Beth travels to New York with Benny, where he trains her for the Paris Invitational. He invites two strong players, Hilton Wexler and Arthur Levertov to assist, along with a model named Cleo, who quickly befriends Beth. Beth repeatedly beats Benny, Wexler, and Levertov at simultaneous speed chess. After the others leave, Beth and Benny have sex, but Benny ruins the mood by talking chess strategy afterwards. At the Paris Invitational, Beth advances to the finals against Borgov. Cleo, who is also in Paris, invites Beth out for drinks, resulting in a late-night bender. Hungover, Beth oversleeps the final and can't focus, losing to Borgov again. Devastated, Beth declines Benny's offer to continue training with him for the Moscow Invitational. She returns to Kentucky, where her lawyer informs her that Allston now has issues with her living in his house. He demands she vacate, but Beth buys the house from him, removes all his belongings, and redecorates. Soon after, she plunges into a days-long drug and alcohol bender, ignoring the outside world. She reluctantly honors her commitment to visit the Kentucky State Championship, where Beltik confronts her about her alcoholism. The next day, Beth finds Jolene at her front door.
7	"End Game"	Scott Frank	Scott Frank	October 23, 2020
In a flashback to 1957, Beth and her mother visit Beth's biological father, who refuses to take Beth in. In the present of 1968, Jolene and Beth attend Mr. Shaibel's funeral. Afterwards, Beth revisits the orphanage and breaks down when she discovers Shaibel followed her career up until his death. Jolene helps her quit drinking with a physical fitness regimen and loans her the money to attend the Moscow Invitational. Beth wins several games, gaining many Russian fans. In the final game against Borgov, Beth plays the Queen's Gambit. The game is adjourned after forty moves. Beth reconnects with Townes, who is covering the tournament for the Lexington Herald-Leader. Beth receives a phone call from Benny, who has assembled Harry, Matt, Mike, Wexler, and Levertov to analyze her game with Borgov. When play resumes that evening, Beth is able to visualize the game without tranquilizer pills and beats Borgov after refusing a draw offer. Beth is celebrated widely by the locals gathered outside the venue. On the drive back to the airport, Beth exits the car and heads for a park where local men play chess. They recognize her and greet her warmly, inviting her to play.

== Production ==
=== Development ===
On March 19, 2019, Netflix gave the production a series order consisting of six episodes. The series was written and directed by Scott Frank, who also created the series with Allan Scott. The two also served as executive producers alongside William Horberg. Allan Scott had been involved in attempts to get the book on screen since 1992, when he purchased the screenplay rights from Walter Tevis's widow.

The series was released on October 23, 2020, with seven episodes instead of the original six-episode order.

=== Writing ===
Former World Chess Champion Garry Kasparov and chess coach Bruce Pandolfini acted as consultants. Pandolfini had consulted with Tevis prior to the novel's publication some 38 years earlier, coming up with the title "The Queen's Gambit".

Pandolfini, together with consultants John Paul Atkinson and Iepe Rubingh, devised several hundred chess positions to be used for various situations in the script. Kasparov developed critical moments in the story, such as when a real 1998 game between grandmasters Arshak Petrosian and Vladimir Akopian was improved to showcase Beth's skill, or a 1993 game between Vasyl Ivanchuk and Patrick Wolff became the prototype for the decisive game in the last episode.

=== Casting ===
Alongside the series order announcement, it was announced that Anya Taylor-Joy was set to star as the lead. In January 2020, it was reported Moses Ingram had joined the cast of the series. Upon the miniseries premiere date announcement, it was announced that Bill Camp, Thomas Brodie-Sangster, Harry Melling and Marielle Heller were cast in starring roles. Because the majority of the filming was carried out in Berlin, the minor roles were filled mostly by British and German actors.

=== Production design and filming ===
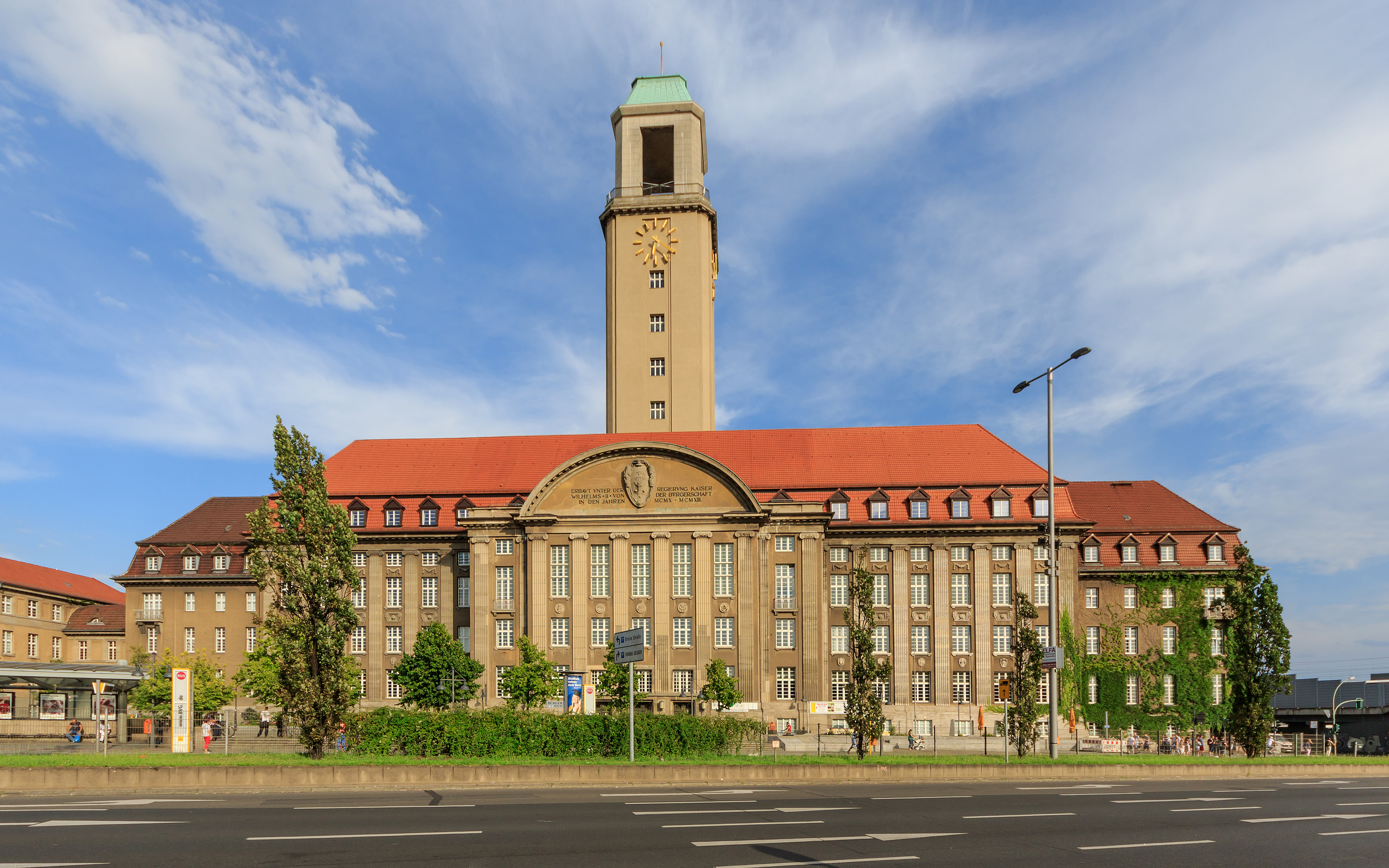
The interior of the Spandau Rathaus stood in for a hotel in Cincinnati, Ohio

Production designer Uli Hanisch developed the series' sets to evoke the aesthetic of the 1950s and 1960s. Much of the series was filmed in Berlin because interiors found there could stand in for a large number of the show's locations, including Las Vegas, Cincinnati, Mexico City, Moscow, and Paris.

Locations used in and near Berlin included the Kino International (for a restaurant, actually the Panorama Bar), the Berlin Zoo (for the zoo scene in Mexico City), the vintage clothes store Humana (for Ben Snyder's Department in Louisville, Kentucky), Schloss Schulzendorf (for the Methuen Home orphanage), the Rathaus Spandau (for a hotel lobby in Cincinnati), the Meistersaal in Kreuzberg (for the Cincinnati tournament), Palais am Funkturm (for the Hotel Mariposa in Las Vegas), the Protestant University of Applied Sciences in Zehlendorf (for the US Championship games location), Haus Cumberland and its Café Grosz (for the Paris tournament), the Bode Museum (for scenes that take place in Paris), Karl-Marx-Allee (exterior of a hotel in Moscow); the final scene of Beth walking in Moscow was filmed at Rosengarten Square, also on Karl-Marx-Allee. The Bärensaal (aka Bear hall) in the Altes Stadthaus was used for scenes set at the Moscow Tournament. The Friedrichstadt-Palast stood in for the Aztec Palace Hotel. The exterior of Henry Clay High School in Lexington was actually filmed at Max Taut Schule.

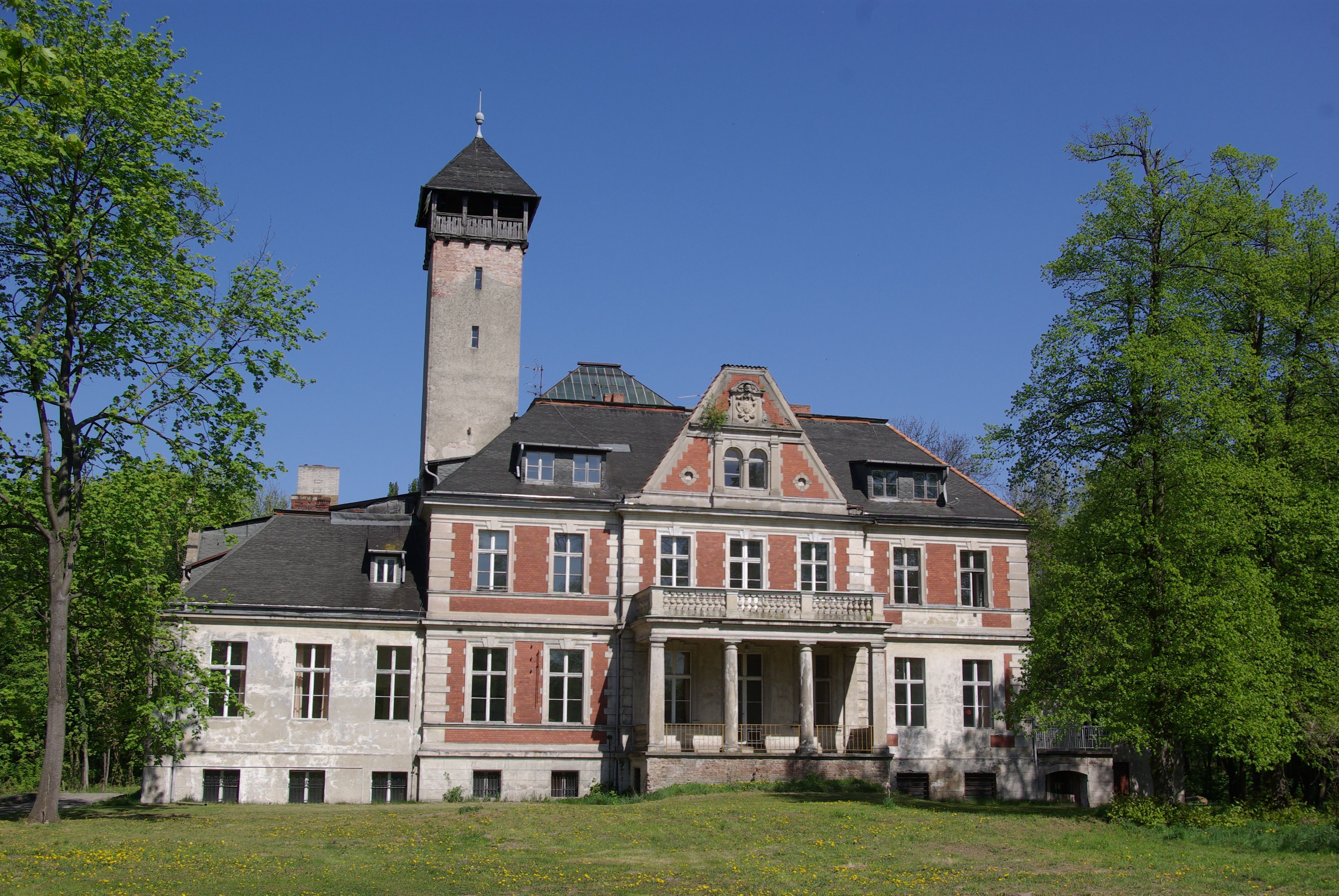
The exterior of Schloss Schulzendorf in Berlin was used for the orphanage

Some scenes were filmed in Canada; principal photography began in August 2019 in Cambridge, Ontario. For example, the Wheatley family home is a house on Brant Road in the city. Other houses where some filming was done are on Salisbury Ave. in Cambridge and on Blenheim Road; the latter is a mansion built in the 19th century. The exterior of St. Andrew's College, Aurora (Ontario) was used for the Ohio Championship facility but the interior was actually a Berlin facility. The exterior of the fictional Ben Snyder Department store in Kentucky was filmed at the Winners department store (Front Street and Berczy Park) in Toronto, Ontario, the rural bridge is the Meadowvale Road Bridge in Toronto and the Fairfield High School in the show is actually Western Technical-Commercial School in Toronto. The fictional Bradley's pharmacy was actually an outdoor set built at Walnut and King streets in Hamilton, Ontario.

=== Music ===
The musical score was composed by Carlos Rafael Rivera. Frank initially wanted the score to be piano-based only, but in the end decided with Rivera for a full orchestral score for more "instrumental depth and color". Rivera also described how he learned of the executive producer William Horberg's love of flute, and added prominent flute sections to the orchestral pieces. Rivera found scoring for chess a challenging task, having been warned by Frank that "music would be doing a lot of heavy lifting". He decided to reflect Beth's growth – both as a person and a chess player – by adding more and more instrumentation over time.

== Reception ==
=== Audience viewership ===
In October 2020, the series was the most watched show on Netflix in the United States. On November 23, 2020, Netflix announced that the series had been watched by 62 million households since its release, becoming "Netflix's biggest scripted limited series to date." Of this, Scott Frank stated "I am both delighted and dazed by the response" while several outlets characterized it as an "unlikely success". The series topped the Nielsen's U.S. streaming rankings for the weeks of October 26 to November 1, November 2 to 8, and November 9 to 15, 2020, making it the first series to do so for three weeks straight.

The Queen's Gambit eventually ranked third in Reelgood's yearly ranking of Netflix shows during 2020, with Cocomelon taking the first spot.

=== Critical response ===
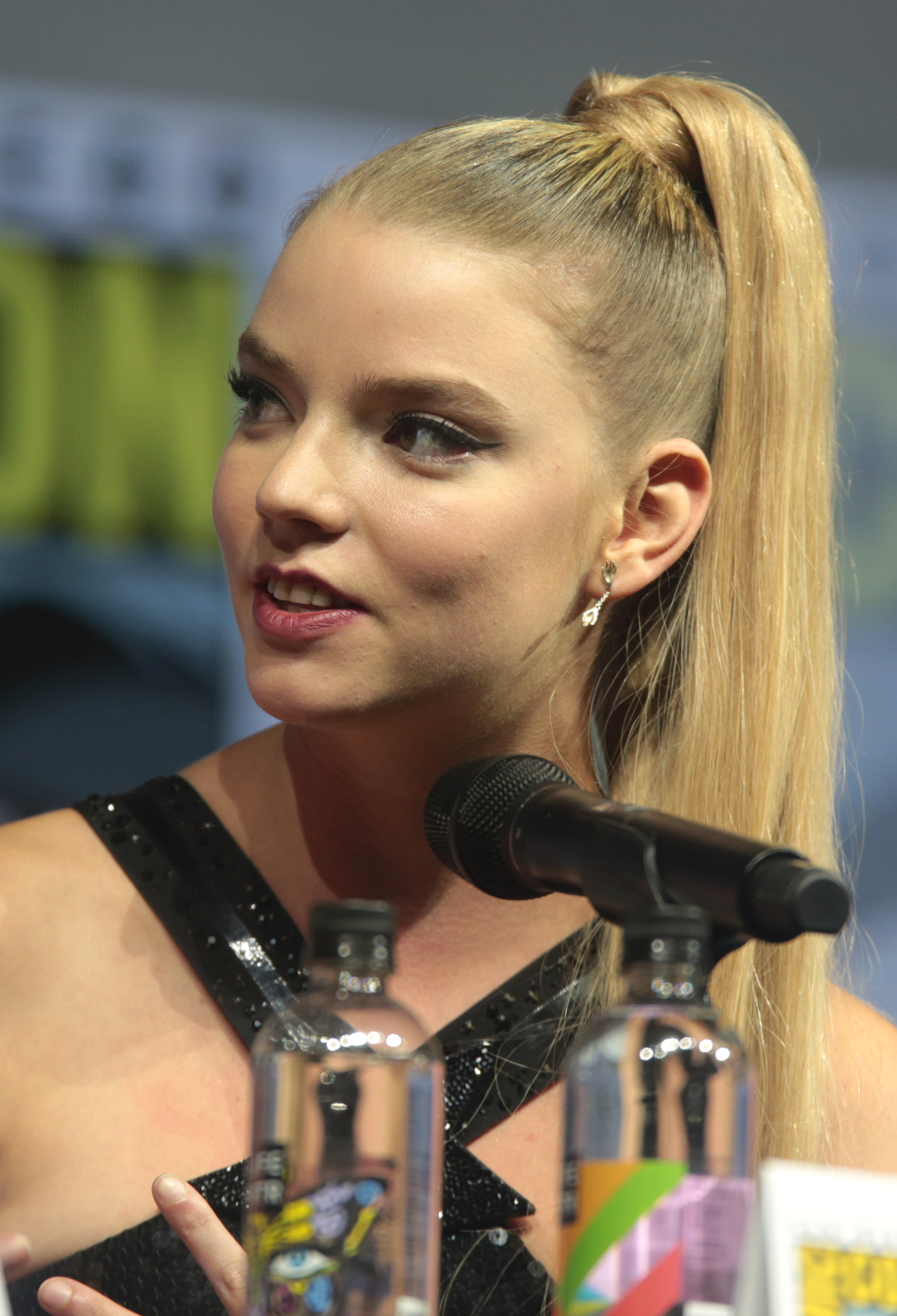
Anya Taylor-Joy's performance as Beth Harmon garnered widespread critical acclaim and earned her a nomination for the Primetime Emmy Award for Outstanding Lead Actress in a Limited Series or Movie.

On review aggregator Rotten Tomatoes, The Queen's Gambit received an approval rating of 96% based on 104 reviews, with an average rating of 8/10. The website's critics consensus reads, "Its moves aren't always perfect, but between Anya Taylor-Joy's magnetic performance, incredibly realized period details, and emotionally intelligent writing, The Queen's Gambit is an absolute win." Metacritic gave the series a weighted average score of 79 out of 100 based on 28 reviews, indicating "generally favorable reviews".

In a column where she argues "So many lives would be different if we'd had The Queen's Gambit 50 years ago," culture critic Mary McNamara said, "I loved The Queen's Gambit so much, I watched the final episode three times." Sara Miller of The New Yorker recounted having experienced a sense of loss in her own association with the novel after seeing its depiction on screen because she could not relate to the main character: "Anya Taylor-Joy is way too good-looking to play Beth Harmon", she notes. Miller argues that Beth's ugliness is a central tension in the novel which the on-screen depiction misses completely despite staying true to everything else in the novel. Darren Franich of Entertainment Weekly gave the series a B and described the lead actress, "Taylor-Joy excels in the quiet moments, her eyelids narrowing as she decimates an opponent, her whole body physicalizing angry desperation when the game turns against her." Variety's Caroline Framke wrote "The Queen's Gambit manages to personalize the game and its players thanks to clever storytelling and, in Anya Taylor-Joy, a lead actor so magnetic that when she stares down the camera lens, her flinty glare threatens to cut right through it." Reviewing for Rolling Stone, Alan Sepinwall gave it 3 out of 5 stars and said, "An aesthetically beautiful project with several superb performances, all in service to a story that starts to feel padded long before the end comes."

Critics also frequently discussed the series' prominent theme of substance abuse. Phoebe Wong notes that "Interestingly though, unlike other works which study the self-destructive aspects of perfectionist obsession, mental health and substance abuse issues extend beyond the protagonist to other characters" in her review for The Tufts Daily. Her summary reads "Impressive in its own right, The Queen's Gambit adopts a fresh perspective by delving into chess' intersections with substance abuse and gender discrimination". Matt Miller of Esquire stated "The result is a pretty scary depiction of the stress of competitive chess in the 1960s." On the other hand, Harper's Bazaar's Lilly Dancyger considered the "misrepresentation" of drug abuse to "nearly ruin the show" for her, using the following Stephen King quote to explain: "The idea that the creative endeavor and mind-altering substances are entwined is one of the great pop-intellectual myths of our time."

The Washington Post's Monica Hesse considers the miniseries "revisionist history" but also "a wonderful future" in that the heroine's "uncluttered path to success" is "uninterrupted by sexism", and has men looking out for the main female character, noting that the show "has no women in peril, and no skeezy men". Carina Chocano of The New York Times Magazine also believes that the show again and again foils the audience's expectations: the janitor does not molest her, her adoptive father leaves her alone, and her adoptive mother Alma does not hold her back, a departure Chocano attributes to the "fantasy"-like quality of The Queen's Gambit. Responding to these reviews, Fred Mazelis of the World Socialist Web Site wrote that "the claims that the series is appreciated because it is fantasy are disingenuous, to say the least. The show has struck a chord precisely because it is not seen as utopian fiction." Bethonie Butler, also of The Washington Post, while praising the show overall, criticized the characterization of Jolene, the show's only major Black character, saying "(her) backstory and character development are so limited that she seems to exist merely to make Beth's life easier".

Many aspects of the series' production values have been praised and discussed, including its location choices, set design, and costumes.

=== Accolades ===
Award	Date of ceremony	Category	Recipient(s)	Result	Ref.
IGN Awards	December 21, 2020	Best TV Series of the Year	The Queen's Gambit	Nominated	
IGN Awards	December 21, 2020	Best Drama TV Series of the Year	The Queen's Gambit	Won	
IGN Awards	December 21, 2020	Best New TV Series of the Year	The Queen's Gambit	Nominated	
IGN Awards	December 21, 2020	Best Dramatic Performance in a TV Series	Anya Taylor-Joy	Nominated	
Hollywood Music in Media Awards	January 27, 2021	Best Original Score in a TV Show/Limited Series	Carlos Rafael Rivera	Won	
Hollywood Music in Media Awards	January 27, 2021	Best Main Title Theme – TV Show/Limited Series	Carlos Rafael Rivera	Nominated	
Satellite Awards	February 15, 2021	Best Miniseries	The Queen's Gambit	Nominated	
Satellite Awards	February 15, 2021	Best Actress in a Miniseries or TV Film	Anya Taylor-Joy	Nominated	
Golden Globe Awards	February 28, 2021	Best Limited Series or Television Film	The Queen's Gambit	Won	
Golden Globe Awards	February 28, 2021	Best Actress – Limited Series or Television Film	Anya Taylor-Joy	Won	
AACTA International Awards	March 6, 2021	Best Drama Series	The Queen's Gambit	Won	
AACTA International Awards	March 6, 2021	Best Actress in a Series	Anya Taylor-Joy	Won	
Critics' Choice Television Awards	March 7, 2021	Best Limited Series	The Queen's Gambit	Won	
Critics' Choice Television Awards	March 7, 2021	Best Actress in a Limited Series or Movie Made for Television	Anya Taylor-Joy	Won	
Critics' Choice Television Awards	March 7, 2021	Best Supporting Actress in a Limited Series or Movie Made for Television	Marielle Heller	Nominated	
USC Scripter Awards	March 13, 2021	Best Adapted TV Screenplay	Scott Frank (for "Openings")	Won	
South by Southwest	March 19, 2021	Title Design Competition	Saskia Marka	Won	
Writers Guild of America Awards	March 21, 2021	Long Form – Adapted	Scott Frank and Allan Scott	Won	
Producers Guild of America Awards	March 24, 2021	David L. Wolper Award for Outstanding Producer of Limited Series Television	William Horberg, Allan Scott, Scott Frank, Marcus Loges and Mick Aniceto	Won	
Make-Up Artists and Hair Stylists Guild Awards	April 3, 2021	Best Television Series, Limited or Miniseries or New Media Series – Best Period and/or Character Make-Up	Daniel Parker	Won	
Make-Up Artists and Hair Stylists Guild Awards	April 3, 2021	Best Television Series, Limited or Miniseries or New Media Series – Best Period and/or Character Hair Styling	Daniel Parker	Nominated	
Screen Actors Guild Awards	April 4, 2021	Outstanding Performance by a Male Actor in a Television Movie or Limited Series	Bill Camp	Nominated	
Screen Actors Guild Awards	April 4, 2021	Outstanding Performance by a Female Actor in a Television Movie or Limited Series	Anya Taylor-Joy	Won	
Art Directors Guild Awards	April 10, 2021	Excellence in Production Design for a Television Movie or Limited Series	Uli Hanisch	Won	
Directors Guild of America Awards	April 10, 2021	Outstanding Directorial Achievement in Movies for Television and Limited Series	Scott Frank	Won	
Costume Designers Guild Awards	April 13, 2021	Excellence in Period Television	Gabriele Binder (for "End Game")	Won	
MPSE Golden Reel Awards	April 17, 2021	Outstanding Achievement in Sound Editing - Sound Effects and Foley for Episodic Long Form Broadcast Media	Eric Hirsch, Gregg Swiatlowski (supervising sound editor); Wylie Stateman (sound designer); Patrick Cicero, Eric Hoehn, Leo Marcil, James David Redding III (sound effects editors) and Rachel Chancey (Foley artist/editor) (for "End Game")	Won (Note: Tied with Star Trek: Picard.)	
MPSE Golden Reel Awards	April 17, 2021	Outstanding Achievement in Sound Editing – Dialogue and ADR for Episodic Long Form Broadcast Media	Gregg Swiatlowski (supervising sound editor); Eric Hirsch (dialogue editor); Eric Hoehn, Leo Marcel, Wylie Stateman (ADR editors) (for "End Game")	Won	
MPSE Golden Reel Awards	April 17, 2021	Outstanding Achievement in Sound Editing – Music Score and Musical for Episodic Long Form Broadcast Media	Tom Kramer (music editor) (for "Adjournment")	Won	
ACE Eddie Awards	April 17, 2021	Best Edited Limited Series or Motion Picture for Television	Michelle Tesoro (for "Exchanges")	Won	
Cinema Audio Society Awards	April 17, 2021	Outstanding Achievement in Sound Mixing for Television Movie or Limited Series	Roland Winke, Eric Hirsch, Eric Hoehn, Leo Marcil and Lawrence Manchester (for "Middle Game")	Won	
American Society of Cinematographers Awards	April 18, 2021	Outstanding Achievement in Cinematography in Motion Picture, Miniseries, or Pilot Made for Television	Steven Meizler (for "End Game")	Won	
MTV Movie & TV Awards	May 16, 2021	Best Performance in a Show	Anya Taylor-Joy	Nominated	
ADC Awards	June 9, 2021	Bronze Cube Award for Main Title Design	Saskia Marka	Won	
Hollywood Critics Association TV Awards	August 29, 2021	Best Streaming Limited Series, Anthology Series or Live-Action Television Movie	The Queen's Gambit	Nominated	
Hollywood Critics Association TV Awards	August 29, 2021	Best Actress in a Limited Series, Anthology Series or Television Movie	Anya Taylor-Joy	Won	
Hollywood Critics Association TV Awards	August 29, 2021	Best Supporting Actor in a Limited Series, Anthology Series or Television Movie	Bill Camp	Nominated	
Hollywood Critics Association TV Awards	August 29, 2021	Best Supporting Actress in a Limited Series, Anthology Series or Television Movie	Marielle Heller	Nominated	
Primetime Creative Arts Emmy Awards	September 11 – 12, 2021	Outstanding Casting for a Limited or Anthology Series or Movie	Ellen Lewis, Kate Sprance, Olivia Scott-Webb, Tina Gerussi, Anna-Lena Slater, Tatjana Moutchnik and Stephanie Maile	Won	
Primetime Creative Arts Emmy Awards	September 11 – 12, 2021	Outstanding Cinematography for a Limited or Anthology Series or Movie	Steven Meizler (for "End Game")	Won	
Primetime Creative Arts Emmy Awards	September 11 – 12, 2021	Outstanding Period Costumes	Gabriele Binder, Gina Krauss, Katrin Hoffmann, Nanrose Buchmann and Sparka Lee Hall (for "End Game")	Won	
Primetime Creative Arts Emmy Awards	September 11 – 12, 2021	Outstanding Period and/or Character Makeup (Non-Prosthetic)	Daniel Parker (for "Adjournment")	Won	
Primetime Creative Arts Emmy Awards	September 11 – 12, 2021	Outstanding Main Title Design	Saskia Marka and David Whyte	Nominated	
Primetime Creative Arts Emmy Awards	September 11 – 12, 2021	Outstanding Music Composition for a Limited or Anthology Series, Movie, or Special	Carlos Rafael Rivera (for "End Game")	Won	
Primetime Creative Arts Emmy Awards	September 11 – 12, 2021	Outstanding Original Music and Lyrics	"I Can't Remember Love" – Anna Hauss, Robert Weinröder and William Horberg (for "Adjournment")	Nominated	
Primetime Creative Arts Emmy Awards	September 11 – 12, 2021	Outstanding Music Supervision	Randall Poster (for "Adjournment")	Nominated	
Primetime Creative Arts Emmy Awards	September 11 – 12, 2021	Outstanding Single-Camera Picture Editing for a Limited or Anthology Series or Movie	Michelle Tesoro (for "Exchanges")	Won	
Primetime Creative Arts Emmy Awards	September 11 – 12, 2021	Outstanding Production Design for a Narrative Period or Fantasy Program (One Hour or More)	Uli Hanisch, Kai Karla Koch and Sabine Schaaf	Won	
Primetime Creative Arts Emmy Awards	September 11 – 12, 2021	Outstanding Sound Editing for a Limited or Anthology Series, Movie or Special	Gregg Swiatlowski, Eric Hirsch, Wylie Stateman, Leo Marcil, Mary-Ellen Porto, Patrick Cicero, James David Redding III, Eric Hoehn, Tom Kramer and Rachel Chancey (for "End Game")	Won	
Primetime Creative Arts Emmy Awards	September 11 – 12, 2021	Outstanding Sound Mixing for a Limited or Anthology Series or Movie	Eric Hirsch, Eric Hoehn, Roland Winke and Lawrence Manchester (for "End Game")	Won	
TCA Awards	September 15, 2021	Program of the Year	The Queen's Gambit	Nominated	
TCA Awards	September 15, 2021	Outstanding Achievement in Movies, Miniseries and Specials	The Queen's Gambit	Nominated	
TCA Awards	September 15, 2021	Individual Achievement in Drama	Anya Taylor-Joy	Nominated	
Primetime Emmy Awards	September 19, 2021	Outstanding Limited or Anthology Series	William Horberg, Allan Scott, Scott Frank, Marcus Loges and Mick Aniceto	Won	
Primetime Emmy Awards	September 19, 2021	Outstanding Directing for a Limited or Anthology Series or Movie	Scott Frank	Won	
Primetime Emmy Awards	September 19, 2021	Outstanding Writing for a Limited or Anthology Series or Movie	Scott Frank	Nominated	
Primetime Emmy Awards	September 19, 2021	Outstanding Lead Actress in a Limited or Anthology Series or Movie	Anya Taylor-Joy	Nominated	
Primetime Emmy Awards	September 19, 2021	Outstanding Supporting Actor in a Limited or Anthology Series or Movie	Thomas Brodie-Sangster	Nominated	
Primetime Emmy Awards	September 19, 2021	Outstanding Supporting Actress in a Limited or Anthology Series or Movie	Moses Ingram	Nominated	
Gotham Awards	November 29, 2021	Outstanding Performance in a New Series	Anya Taylor-Joy	Nominated	
Grammy Awards	April 3, 2022	Best Score Soundtrack for Visual Media	Carlos Rafael Rivera	Won (Note: Tied with Jon Batiste, Trent Reznor and Atticus Ross for Soul.)	

=== Chess community response ===
The series received praise from the chess community for its realistic portrayal of the game and players. In an interview with Vanity Fair, Woman Grandmaster Jennifer Shahade said that the series "completely nailed the chess accuracy". In an article about the miniseries in The Times, British chess champion David Howell felt that the chess scenes were "well choreographed and realistic", while British Women's chess champion Jovanka Houska said, "I think it's a fantastic TV series ... [i]t conveys the emotion of chess really well." Houska stated that she related to Beth being one of the few women in a tournament, and noted that sexism was worse at the "hobby" level, especially for young girls. International Master Dorsa Derakhshani described the show as "very, very accurate" and that she was surprised at "how actually strong the games are".

Judit Polgár, who was the first woman to play for a world championship title, said that the show depicted the male players as "too nice", while chess streamer Andrea Botez also felt the show "toned down" the sexism in the chess world. Former British women's champion Sarah Longson said that realistically, Beth should have lost more. Reigning chess world champion Magnus Carlsen gave it 5 out of 6 stars but found it "a little too unrealistic" for how quickly Beth developed her skills.

=== Lawsuit ===
In the final episode of the mini-series, the women's world champion Nona Gaprindashvili is mentioned as having "never faced men", despite the real-life Gaprindashvili frequently playing against male opponents, including top-level grandmasters. In response, Gaprindashvili said it is dishonouring to have misinformation spread about someone's achievements. She sued Netflix for $5 million in a defamation lawsuit in September 2021, and called for the line that claimed she had never faced men to be removed. The case was settled in September 2022, on undisclosed terms.

=== Interest in chess ===
In November 2020, The Washington Post reported that the COVID-19 pandemic had already increased the public's interest in chess, but the popularity of The Queen's Gambit made it explode. The New York Times compared the interest in chess to the "similar chess mania" after Bobby Fischer beat Boris Spassky to become world champion in 1972. According to The Guardian, grandmaster Maurice Ashley has been inundated by messages from people – mainly women – enthused by the series: "the frenzy around it is crazy". International master Levy Rozman considers The Queen's Gambit "single-handedly the biggest thing to ever happen to chess."

Sales of chess sets rose greatly following the release of the series, with U.S. company Goliath Games stating their chess set sales increased over a thousand percent due to the series, while marketing firm NPD Group found chess book sales had increased over 600 percent. Chess.com reports several million new users since the release of the series, with a higher rate of registrations by female players compared to before the series. Chess instructors have stated that the demand for chess lessons has significantly increased as well.

== Adaptations ==
In early 2021, due to the success of the series, the theatrical rights to the Tevis novel were acquired with the intent of producing a musical. It is set to be produced by playwright Eboni Booth, director Whitney White, and singer-songwriter Mitski.

Netflix released a tie-in chess simulator game adaptation in 2023.

== Legacy ==
Together with The Crown, another Netflix production, costumes from The Queen's Gambit were put on display by the Brooklyn Museum as part of its virtual exhibition "The Queen and the Crown".
