= Carlos Rafael Rivera =

Guatemalan-American composer

- Born: Carlos Rafael Rivera; August 18, 1970 (age 55)
- Occupations: Music composer

Carlos Rafael Rivera (born 18 August 1970) is an American composer based in Guatemala. In 2014, his music score for the movie A Walk Among the Tombstones advanced for Oscar in the Best Original Score category. He has won an Emmy Award (for Outstanding Music Composition for a Limited or Anthology Series, Movie or Special), a Grammy Award (for Best Score Soundtrack for Visual Media), and a Hollywood Music in Media Award (for Best Original Score in a TV Show/Limited Series) for his work in the Netflix miniseries The Queen's Gambit and received 2 additional Emmy nominations (for Outstanding Music Composition for a Limited Series, Movie, or Special and Outstanding Original Main Title Theme Music) for his work in Godless.

== Education ==
He attended Belen Jesuit Preparatory School for high school. He studied guitar and received a Bachelor of Music in Composition at Florida International University School of Music in Miami in 1996. He has a Doctor of Musical Arts degree from the University of Southern California.

== Discography ==
=== Film and television soundtracks ===
Title	Year
Without a Map	1999
Dragonfly	2002
Crash	2005
Feast	2006
A Walk Among the Tombstones	2014
Godless	2017
The Queen's Gambit	2020
Just Beyond	2021
Hacks	2022
La Reina del Sur (season 3)	2022
Chupa	2023
Lessons in Chemistry	2023
Griselda	2024
Dept. Q	2025
They Will Kill You	2026
