= Godless (miniseries) =

American Western drama

- Genre: Western drama
- Created by: Scott Frank
- Written by: Scott Frank
- Directed by: Scott Frank
- Starring: Jack O'Connell; Michelle Dockery; Scoot McNairy; Merritt Wever; Thomas Brodie-Sangster; Tantoo Cardinal; Kim Coates; Sam Waterston; Jeff Daniels
- Music by: Carlos Rafael Rivera
- Country of origin: United States
- No. of episodes: 7

Production
- Executive producers: Scott Frank; Steven Soderbergh; Casey Silver
- Producers: Jessica Levin; Michael Malone
- Production location: Santa Fe, New Mexico
- Cinematography: Steven Meizler
- Editor: Michelle Tesoro
- Camera setup: Single-camera
- Running time: 41–80 minutes
- Production companies: Casey Silver Productions; Extension 765; Flitcraft, Ltd.

Original release
- Network: Netflix
- Release: November 22, 2017

Godless is an American Western drama miniseries created, written and directed by Scott Frank. It stars Jack O'Connell, Michelle Dockery, Scoot McNairy, Merritt Wever, Thomas Brodie-Sangster, Tantoo Cardinal, Kim Coates, Sam Waterston, and Jeff Daniels. Set in 1884, a young outlaw on the run from his vengeful mentor winds up in a small New Mexico town populated almost entirely by women.

The series began production in Santa Fe, New Mexico, in September 2016, and was released on Netflix on November 22, 2017. The series received positive reviews, and was named one of the year's 10 best by The Washington Post and Vanity Fair.

== Cast ==
=== Main ===
- Jack O'Connell as Roy Goode, an injured outlaw on the run from his former boss and mentor, Frank Griffin, as he no longer can stomach Griffin's behavior.
- Michelle Dockery as Alice Fletcher, an independent and aloof widow managing a small ranch outside La Belle with her mother-in-law and adolescent son.
- Scoot McNairy as Bill McNue, the sheriff of La Belle, a town where almost all of the men have died in a mining accident.
- Merritt Wever as Mary Agnes McNue, Bill's determined, pragmatic and intrepid sister. She is the widow of the late mayor of La Belle and has fallen in love with another woman: Callie Dunne, ex-prostitute and current schoolteacher.
- Thomas Brodie-Sangster as Whitey Winn, the young town deputy who is devoted to the town and the sheriff and afraid of no one.
- Tantoo Cardinal as Iyovi, Alice's Paiute mother-in-law.
- Kim Coates as Ed Logan, an arrogant and abrasive company man who comes into La Belle.
- Sam Waterston as Marshal John Cook, the law in Santa Fe who is on the hunt for Griffin.
- Jeff Daniels as Frank Griffin, a menacing outlaw who is terrorizing the West.

=== Recurring ===
- Tess Frazer as Callie Dunne, a former prostitute, current schoolteacher and lover of Mary Agnes McNue.
- Samantha Soule as Charlotte Temple, a nervous and put-together woman always in her Sunday best.
- Audrey Moore as Sarah Doyle, a randy woman in her thirties dying for a man's company.
- Samuel Marty as Truckee, Alice's son.
- Jeremy Bobb as A.T. Grigg, the editor of the Santa Fe Daily Review, who has been obsessed for years with writing about the Griffin Gang.
- Adam David Thompson as Gatz Brown, Griffin's righthand man.
- Russell Dennis Lewis as Daryl Devlin, the murderous twin brother of Donnie in Griffin's gang of outlaws.
- Matthew Dennis Lewis as Donnie Devlin, murderous twin brother of Daryl in Griffin's gang of outlaws.
- Joe Pingue as Alonzo Bunker, a member of Griffin's gang of outlaws.
- Justin Welborn as Floyd Wilson, a skillful tracker in Griffin's gang of outlaws.
- Keith Jardine as Dyer Howe, a member of Griffin's gang of outlaws who is especially useful with knives.
- Christiane Seidel as Martha Bischoff, a mysterious German woman who raises some suspicion in La Belle.
- Nathan Darrow as Webster, a Pinkerton agent searching for Martha.
- Kayli Carter as Sadie Rose, a widow of La Belle.
- Russell G. Jones as Hiram, one of the few surviving men of La Belle.
- Randy Oglesby as Asa Leopold, one of the few surviving men of La Belle, who runs the dry goods store.
- Duane Howard as Shoshone Brave, a mysterious figure with a dog companion who is trailing Bill McNue.
- Jessica Sula as Louise Hobbs, Whitey's love interest and a skilled violinist.
- Erik LaRay Harvey as Elias Hobbs, Louise's father and a Civil War veteran.
- Rob Morgan as John Randall, a 10th US Cavalry's veteran. The character is loosely based on the same-named Indian Wars' hero, who is said (by legend) to have single-handed killed 13 Cheyenne warriors, so 'fathering' the creation of the American-Native's term 'buffalo soldiers'.
- Julian Grey as William McNue, Bill's son.
- Marie Wagenman as Trudy McNue, Bill's daughter.
- Marceline Hugot as Lucy Cole, a nun who cares for Roy and his older brother when they were children.

=== Guest ===
- Christopher Fitzgerald as J.J. Valentine, the smooth talking president of the Quicksilver Mining Company looking to take over the mine in La Belle.
- Whitney Able as Anna McNue, Bill McNue's deceased wife, who died giving birth to their daughter.

== Production ==
It was filmed from September 2016 to February 2017 and was released in November 2017. Filming locations include New Mexico, primarily on location, although the production was based at Santa Fe Studios. The town of La Belle, with a full 28 buildings, was constructed at the San Cristobal Ranch near Lamy. Other locations included Bonanza Creek Ranch in Santa Fe, Santa Clara Pueblo, a location near Abiquiú, Diablo Canyon near Los Alamos, El Rancho de las Golondrinas in Santa Fe, Cherry Meadow near Pecos, Jemez Pueblo, and the Galisteo ranch; the latter, in the Galisteo Basin outside Santa Fe, also known as Cerro Pelon Ranch, was the location for the town of Creede, attacked by the Griffin gang.

According to one source, the final shot of the series, set on the California coast in a fictionalized version of Atascadero, California, was filmed near Big Sur, California, but inland, not on the coast.

Matthew Goode was cast as the brother of Jack O'Connell's character and filmed a scene for the ending of the final episode but it was cut.

== Episodes ==
No.	Title	Directed by	Written by	Original release date
1	"An Incident at Creede"	Scott Frank	Scott Frank	November 22, 2017
In 1884, Marshal John Cook's posse, trailing Frank Griffin's outlaw gang, comes to the mining town Creede, Colorado. Everyone there was killed. On a wrecked train outside town, only a woman survived. This was the work of Frank's gang, and Roy Goode, a former member, rode off with the money that they had stolen from the train in an attempt to draw the gang away. Wounded, Roy seeks help at the ranch of Alice Fletcher outside La Belle, New Mexico, a town consisting of mostly women after almost all the men died in a mining accident. Alice nurses him back to health with the help of Iyovi, her Paiute mother-in-law, and Truckee, Alice's mixed-race son. Cook arrives in La Belle, and warns the local sheriff, Bill McNue, that Frank's gang may come there next. When Bill visits Alice's ranch to persuade her to sell the town some horses, Roy gives himself up and reveals his crimes. Frank's gang began killing everyone in Creede after Roy stole the money. Roy tried to stop the massacre but only succeeded in killing some members of the gang and disabling Frank by shooting off his left arm. Bill takes Roy into custody.
2	"The Ladies of La Belle"	Scott Frank	Scott Frank	November 22, 2017
The Quicksilver Mining Company, led by J.J. Valentine and accompanied by head of security Ed Logan, arrive in La Belle to discuss the future of the mine. Quicksilver proposes a deal to get La Belle back on its feet. While Mary Agnes McNue, Bill's sister and the widow of the town mayor, believes the deal to be suspicious, she is overruled and the town takes the deal. Frank confronts A.T. Grigg, a newspaper editor, and forces him to write an article enhancing Frank's image. Bill and Roy discuss finding Frank before he tracks Roy to La Belle. Bill goes off in search of Frank, leaving his deputy Whitey Winn in charge of Roy. However, Alice breaks Roy out. Alice strikes a deal with Roy, giving him food, a place to sleep, and teaching him to read in exchange for him breaking her horses. Bill hears a story from a cafe patron about a gang of twenty five men (the size of Frank's gang). He schedules a meeting with Cook.
3	"Wisdom of the Horse"	Scott Frank	Scott Frank	November 22, 2017
At the canyon where Roy stood down Frank's gang, Bill meets a Native American. Cook meets with Valentine, and urges Quicksilver to go to La Belle and protect them against Frank Griffin. At Alice's ranch, Whitey and a posse ask for Roy back; however, they do not know it is really Roy Goode, as Bill told Whitey and others his name was "Mr. Ward". Alice agrees to sell her horses to the town if Roy can stay and break them. Bill comes across a Norwegian immigrant family traumatized by an encounter with Frank and his gang; they urge Bill to find and kill Frank. Whitey goes to Blackdom, a small village near La Belle made up of Buffalo Soldiers, to take violin lessons from his friend Louise, in spite of the village and her father's animosity towards him. Grigg publishes Frank's story, declaring that the gang is coming and will kill Roy and anyone who protects him. Logan arrives at La Belle with his security men and declares himself "the law" in Bill's absence. Cook arrives at his meeting place with Bill, but the Griffin Gang are already there, and they kill him.
4	"Fathers & Sons"	Scott Frank	Scott Frank	November 22, 2017
Noting the local sheriff's apathy, and seeing that a Griffin gang member stole Cook's badge, Bill becomes more motivated to find Frank. The Griffin Gang finds a house full of people dead and suffering from smallpox. Frank decides to stay and help the sick; he is unafraid to do so because he claims to know exactly how he will die. Roy goes hunting with Truckee and Iyovi and finds a box of mail in a crashed stagecoach. Logan goes to Blackdom and tells the Buffalo Soldiers that, if they keep to themselves, Quicksilver will divert a river to the village. Grigg, believing Roy to be in La Belle, goes there, but the townsfolk (not knowing "Mr. Ward" is Roy) tell him that he is being fooled. A flashback introduces Lucy Cole, a nun who cared for Roy and his older brother Jim as children. Whitey is told by Louise's father to stay away. Seeing him beat Louise, Whitey nearly shoots him but is interrupted by Roy; Whitey talks to Roy and realizes that Roy is a good man. Bill encounters the Griffin gang. Frank contemplates killing Bill but thinks better of it and leaves with his gang.
5	"Shot the Head off a Snake"	Scott Frank	Scott Frank	November 22, 2017
Flashbacks show Roy's relationship with Frank and Frank's focus on the gang being family, as well as Roy meeting Frank after leaving Lucy. In the present, Grigg speaks with Charlotte, a calm, religious La Belle resident. Grigg learns of the man at the Fletcher ranch, whom he hypothesizes is Roy. Mary Agnes sees her lover Callie with another woman, leading to an argument in the street; she and Whitey share in their heartbreak. Alice has been teaching Roy to read; their bond grows as he reads a love letter from the mail he found. Roy says he has become his own father and no longer needed Frank as a surrogate. Frank and the gang come upon the last known location of Lucy to find she is gone, but they learn she bought a nearby saloon. Grigg sees "Mr. Ward" and knows him to be Roy. He rides off to report his sighting.
6	"Dear Roy..."	Scott Frank	Scott Frank	November 22, 2017
Grigg prepares a special edition of his paper which will report Roy being in La Belle. Instead of warning the people, Grigg wants a shootout so he has a story to report. Mary Agnes reunites with Callie. Roy prepares to leave the ranch, and finally reads the letter from his brother Jim, which says he is living happily in California. Truckee learns Roy plans to leave and becomes furious, lashing out at him, making Roy emotional. Alice approaches Roy, showing him her scars, and they share an intimate night together. The next morning, Roy rides off, but leaves the letter for Alice to read, which she does. Frank reads Grigg's article, and rides off to La Belle. In a flashback, the women of La Belle joyfully walk their husbands to work at the mine, not knowing it will be the last time.
7	"Homecoming"	Scott Frank	Scott Frank	November 22, 2017
Callie, Mary Agnes, and other women read Grigg's paper. They go to Alice's ranch to retrieve Roy, but he has already left. Mary Agnes suggests hiding in the hills, but Logan and his men stole the horses and fled. Roy and Bill track the men down; they incapacitate them and ride to La Belle. Frank and his men go to Blackdom, where he warns them to stay out of the fight; however, the people recognize Frank. A shootout ensues that kills nearly all of Blackdom, except Louise, who is saved by Whitey. Alice rides out looking for Truckee, but upon seeing the Griffin Gang, goes to La Belle and joins the fight. The women of La Belle arm themselves for a last stand inside the hotel while the children hide in the mine. As the gang arrives, Whitey goes out to confront them, but is killed by a gang member with a knife. A shootout ensues between the Griffin Gang and the women of La Belle. Midway through, Roy and Bill arrive. Many citizens of La Belle and all of the Griffin Gang die, but Frank flees. Roy gives pursuit, confronts Frank and kills him in a duel. The survivors hold a funeral for the fallen, during which the town's long-awaited preacher arrives and gives a eulogy for Whitey. Roy says goodbye to Alice and Truckee, and rides to California, leaving behind money for Alice.

== Reception ==
=== Critical response ===
The series received positive reviews. Review aggregator website Rotten Tomatoes gave it an 83% rating and average rating of 7.9 out of 10, based on 80 reviews, with critics consensus, "Vistas and violence root Godless firmly in traditional Western territory, but its female-driven ensemble sets it apart in a male-dominated genre." On Metacritic, it has a score of 75 out of 100, based on 25 reviews, indicating "generally favorable reviews".

Alan Sepinwall from Uproxx reviewed it positively, saying, "Godless doesn't quite find that happy middle, but the storytelling excesses created by this format make it more fun than the traditional movie version probably would have been."

Vanity Fair and The Washington Post included Godless on their "best shows of 2017" lists.

=== Awards and nominations ===
Ceremorny	Category	Nominee(s)	Result	Ref.
23rd Critics' Choice Awards	Best Limited Series	Godless	Nominated	
23rd Critics' Choice Awards	Best Actor in a Movie/Limited Series	Jeff Daniels	Nominated	
23rd Critics' Choice Awards	Best Actor in a Movie/Limited Series	Jack O'Connell	Nominated	
70th Directors Guild of America Awards	Outstanding Directing – Miniseries or TV Film	Scott Frank	Nominated	
29th GLAAD Media Awards	Outstanding TV Movie or Limited Series	Godless	Nominated	
70th Primetime Emmy Awards	Outstanding Limited or Anthology Series	Casey Silver, Steven Soderbergh, Scott Frank, Jessica Levin and Michael Malone	Nominated	
70th Primetime Emmy Awards	Outstanding Lead Actress in a Limited Series or Movie	Michelle Dockery	Nominated	
70th Primetime Emmy Awards	Outstanding Supporting Actor in a Limited Series or Movie	Jeff Daniels (for "An Incident at Creede")	Won	
70th Primetime Emmy Awards	Outstanding Supporting Actress in a Limited Series or Movie	Merritt Wever (for "The Ladies of La Belle")	Won	
70th Primetime Emmy Awards	Outstanding Directing for a Limited Series, Movie, or Dramatic Special	Scott Frank	Nominated	
70th Primetime Emmy Awards	Outstanding Writing for a Limited Series, Movie, or Dramatic Special	Scott Frank	Nominated	
70th Primetime Emmy Awards	Outstanding Casting for a Limited Series, Movie, or Special	Ellen Lewis, Jo Edna Boldin and Rene Haynes	Nominated	
70th Primetime Emmy Awards	Outstanding Cinematography for a Limited Series or Movie	Steven Meizler (for "An Incident at Creede")	Nominated	
70th Primetime Emmy Awards	Outstanding Hairstyling for a Limited Series or Movie	Geordie Sheffer, Megan Daum and Carmen Jones	Nominated	
70th Primetime Emmy Awards	Outstanding Music Composition for a Limited Series, Movie, or Special	Carlos Rafael Rivera (for "Homecoming")	Nominated	
70th Primetime Emmy Awards	Outstanding Original Main Title Theme Music	Carlos Rafael Rivera	Won	
70th Primetime Emmy Awards	Outstanding Sound Editing for a Limited Series, Movie, or Special	Wylie Stateman, Eric Hoehn, Harry Cohen, Gregg Swiatlowski, Hector C. Gika, Leo Marcil, Sylvain Lasseur, Jackie Zhou and Tom Kramer (for "Homecoming")	Nominated	
24th Screen Actors Guild Awards	Outstanding Performance by a Male Actor in a Television Movie or Limited Series	Jeff Daniels	Nominated	
70th Writers Guild of America Awards	Outstanding Writing for a Long Form – Original	Scott Frank	Nominated	
