= Mockingbird (Tevis novel) =

1980 novel by Walter Tevis

- First edition cover
- Author: Walter Tevis
- Cover artist: Fred Marcellino
- Language: English
- Genre: Science fiction
- Publisher: Doubleday
- Publication date: 1980
- Publication place: United States
- Media type: Print (hardcover)
- Pages: 247
- ISBN: 0-385-14933-6
- OCLC: 5555669
- LC Class: 78022773

Mockingbird is a 1980 science fiction novel by American writer Walter Tevis. Set chiefly in a depopulated twenty-fifth-century New York City, the novel depicts a society in which robots administer human life, drugs and television pacify the population, and reading has largely disappeared. The story follows Robert Spofforth, a long-lived android who wants to die, and Paul Bentley and Mary Lou Borne, two humans whose rediscovery of reading and personal attachment brings them into conflict with the social order.

The novel has been interpreted as a dystopian critique of technological dependence and social isolation, with particular attention to literacy, drug use, privacy, and the status of conscious machines. Contemporary reception was mixed, with reviewers praising Tevis's storytelling and allegorical control while also criticizing the novel's bleakness, derivative elements, and heavy-handed symbolism. Mockingbird was nominated for the Nebula Award for Best Novel. A feature film adaptation was announced by Searchlight Pictures in 2022, with Alma Har'el attached to direct.

== Background and publication ==
Mockingbird was first published by Doubleday in 1980. It appeared late in Tevis's science-fiction career, after The Man Who Fell to Earth, and during what Michael Dirda describes as Tevis's late-1970s effort to restart his writing career after becoming sober and moving to New York.

Tevis connected the novel to recovery, literacy, passivity, and the emotional force of nonhuman characters. In a 1981 interview published in Brick, he contrasted The Man Who Fell to Earth, which he said concerned his becoming alcoholic, with Mockingbird, which concerned, for him, coming out of alcoholism. The novel's emphasis on literacy drew on his twenty-five years as an English teacher, while the opening scene with Spofforth drew emotionally on his own suicide attempts, on King Kong as a model for a tragic nonhuman figure, and structurally on the scaffold scenes in The Scarlet Letter. In Tevis's account, Spofforth's sexlessness, regenerative body, and emotional intensity linked him imaginatively to both King Kong and Frankenstein's monster. The disappearance of reading also belonged to a broader pattern of television, mind-altering chemicals, and passivity, while Paul Bentley's story represented a movement from passivity toward activity. Rather than treating the novel as an attempt to predict the future, Tevis described it as a way of using science-fiction materials to write about present spiritual life and as a book concerned with the danger of replacing lived experience with mediated substitutes.

Bantam published a paperback edition in 1981, followed by a Del Rey edition in 1999. Vintage Books published a paperback edition in 2022 as part of a broader release of Tevis's adult backlist.

== Plot ==
Mockingbird is set in the twenty-fifth century, chiefly in New York City, where the human population has sharply diminished. Most people live under the care of robots, use mood-altering drugs, and follow social rules that discourage intimacy, curiosity, and sustained contact with others. Reading has disappeared from ordinary life and is treated as forbidden or obsolete. Children are rare, public institutions have largely lost their original functions, and many machines continue operating by routine.

Robert Spofforth, a Make Nine android, serves as dean of New York University. He is the most advanced robot remaining; his metal brain contains edited human memories, and his manufactured body is described as that of a Black man. Spofforth has lived for centuries and wants to die, but his programming prevents suicide while humans remain alive for him to serve. The novel opens with his failed attempt to throw himself from the Empire State Building.

Paul Bentley, a teacher from Ohio, comes to Spofforth after teaching himself to read. Bentley has discovered old instructional materials that allow him to connect written words with spoken language. He asks to teach reading, but Spofforth refuses. Instead, Spofforth assigns him to the basement of New York University, where Bentley records the written title cards from old silent films. The work gives Bentley access to films, books, and other remnants of the literate past, and his reading ability improves.

Bentley lives among people who accept drugs, mechanical services, and slogans about privacy as normal. As he reads more, he learns more about history, language, and human relationships. He begins keeping written records of his experiences. His work at the university also gives him access to parts of the old library, where he discovers books that broaden his knowledge of the past.

At the Bronx Zoo, Bentley meets Mary Lou Borne, a young woman who has escaped much of the social conditioning that governs other people. The zoo is partly derelict and populated by mechanical animals, with children living there under the care of malfunctioning systems. Mary Lou is skeptical of robots and does not accept the rules of privacy as readily as others do. Bentley tells her about reading and begins teaching her. She learns quickly, and the two become close.

Bentley and Mary Lou move into rooms at the university and continue reading together. They stop taking the drugs that had kept them passive, share books, and begin living as a couple. Their relationship violates the society's rules against cohabitation and emotional attachment, and their reading violates the prohibition on literacy. Mary Lou encourages Bentley to pay attention to his own life and to write it down, while Bentley's reading gives both of them access to ideas and emotions largely absent from their world.

Spofforth discovers their relationship and intervenes. As one of the last functioning Detectors, he identifies their violations and has Bentley arrested. Bentley is separated from Mary Lou and sent to a prison where inmates perform industrial labor, including work in a shoe factory. In prison, Bentley enters a harsher environment than the passive life he knew in the city. He finds other books, continues reading, and learns to survive without the routines of drugs and automated care.

Mary Lou remains in New York and is taken into Spofforth's household. She is pregnant with Bentley's child. Spofforth's interest in her is partly connected to her intelligence and independence, and partly to the child she carries. Because Spofforth cannot die while humanity continues, the birth of another human being threatens to prolong his existence. Mary Lou refuses to give up the child despite Spofforth's pressure.

Bentley eventually escapes from prison and travels through the depopulated United States. His journey takes him through abandoned places, broken infrastructure, and small remnants of human society. In one episode, he stays with an isolated religious community living in an old shopping mall. He continues to read when he can, becomes more self-reliant, and gradually makes his way back toward New York.

When Bentley returns, he reunites with Mary Lou and learns that she has given birth to their daughter, Jane. Because Spofforth's programming prevents him from dying while humans remain alive for him to serve, Jane's birth represents the human survival that keeps him from ending his own existence.

The final confrontation returns to the Empire State Building. Spofforth, Bentley, and Mary Lou go to the top of the building, where Spofforth is finally able to die with their assistance. His death completes the suicide he could not accomplish at the beginning of the novel. Afterward, Bentley and Mary Lou prepare to leave New York with Jane. The novel closes with the human characters moving away from the city and carrying literacy, memory, and family life into an uncertain future.

== Themes and analysis ==
Scholars have emphasized how Mockingbird links social collapse to drug use, technological dependence, and the loss of literacy. John Hickman classifies the novel as one of seven twentieth-century "drug dystopias", identifying Sopor as its fictional drug and comparing its use with works such as Brave New World, in which invented drugs help make populations docile or reinforce dystopian social orders. In Mockingbird, that pharmacological control is intertwined with a culture of television, automation, and declining literacy, reinforcing the novel's portrayal of a passive and dependent society.

Jorge L. Contreras includes Mockingbird in a bibliography of law and science fiction and assigns it to categories including personhood, encountering the other, dystopianism, utopianism, and crime and punishment. His discussion focuses on the novel's privacy regime, in which ordinary social conduct can become punishable as a privacy invasion. Contreras argues that Tevis reverses a familiar dystopian pattern: social collapse comes not from collectivism but from enforced introversion and privacy. In that account, cohabitation and other forms of sustained personal contact are treated not as private choices but as violations of the social order.

Spofforth's role has been read through the estranging effect of machine consciousness. Jen Fawkes reads his copied memories, emotional residues, and programmed inability to kill himself as part of the novel's uncanny effect, arguing that Tevis's nonhuman figures are powerful because readers recognize them as both humanlike and nonhuman. The Encyclopedia of Science Fiction describes the novel as an angst-ridden example of robot existentialism. Tevis's own comments similarly emphasize Spofforth as a figure of intensified emotion rather than a merely mechanical intelligence: he described the character as capable of love and linked him imaginatively to HAL, King Kong, and Frankenstein's monster.

Liz W. Faber analyzes Spofforth's death wish and final death through the framework of robot suicide, voluntary euthanasia, and eugenics. Her argument connects Spofforth's manufactured body, lack of genitalia, Blackness, and association with King Kong to the novel's treatment of racialized and disabled otherness. Faber argues that the novel's handling of Spofforth's death raises problems of agency, otherness, race, disability, and eugenic logic.

== Reception ==
Contemporary mainstream reviewers discussed Mockingbird as a dystopian work, though they differed over its originality and allegorical force. Kirkus Reviews described the novel as skillful but bleak, judging it solid as a science-fiction parable and moderately effective as social criticism, while criticizing its allegory and mythic parallels as heavy-handed. In The Washington Post, Michael Bishop reviewed the novel more favorably, describing it as engrossing and emphasizing its narrative power, while arguing that Doubleday's comparison of the book to Brave New World and Nineteen Eighty-Four overstated its status as a pathbreaking dystopian work. John Nicholson, reviewing the novel in The Times, praised Tevis's storytelling craft, noted echoes of Orwell, and suggested that the book could reach readers beyond the usual science-fiction audience. Mockingbird was nominated for the 1980 Nebula Award for Best Novel, which was won by Gregory Benford's Timescape.

Specialist science-fiction reviewers were more divided. Colin Greenland, writing in Foundation, compared Mockingbird unfavorably with The Man Who Fell to Earth, finding its plot more formulaic and its ending too easy, but treating its message about humanity, machines, and responsibility as sincerely meant. In Vector, Bill Carlin also found the plot derivative, but said Tevis made the novel readable and effective through sincerity, simple prose, and control of its allegorical material. Bruce Gillespie, reviewing the novel in SF Commentary, gave a strongly negative review, calling it "remarkably bad" and criticizing what he saw as the simplicity of a novel about a future without literacy.

Later reviewers discussed Mockingbird within Tevis's small body of science-fiction work while emphasizing its mixture of genre form, fable, and psychological characterization. André-François Ruaud described Tevis's body of work as limited but marked by quality, and argued that Mockingbird gave life to its three central characters through psychological and literary methods within a science-fiction frame. James Sallis, reviewing the 1999 Del Rey editions of Tevis's science-fiction novels in The Magazine of Fantasy & Science Fiction, characterized them as fables, parables, social satire, contemporary myth, and genre science fiction, and described Mockingbird as a black-humor narrative centered on a robot's death wish.

Twenty-first-century discussion of the novel connected it to Tevis's broader posthumous reputation and renewed attention following the adaptation of The Queen's Gambit. In 2021, Michael Dirda described Mockingbird as an obliquely autobiographical parable of addiction, self-realization, and literacy. That same year, Silvia Moreno-Garcia and Lavie Tidhar included it in a Washington Post discussion of science-fiction and fantasy works that had "fallen off the radar"; Moreno-Garcia compared Mockingbird loosely to Nineteen Eighty-Four, Fahrenheit 451, and WALL-E.

== Adaptation ==
In April 2022, Searchlight Pictures, Variety, and The Hollywood Reporter announced and reported a feature film adaptation of Mockingbird, with Alma Har'el set to direct; the announcement named J. Miles Dale, Robert Schwartz, Har'el, and Christopher Leggett as producers, and Alejandro Laguette and Rafael Marmor as executive producers.
