= The Man Who Fell to Earth (disambiguation) =

The Man Who Fell to Earth is a 1976 film starring David Bowie and directed by Nicolas Roeg.

The Man Who Fell to Earth may also refer to:

- The Man Who Fell to Earth (novel), the 1963 science fiction novel by Walter Tevis
- The Man Who Fell to Earth (1987 film), the television film adaptation of the novel
- The Man Who Fell to Earth (TV series), the Showtime series, a sequel to the 1976 film

== See also ==
- "The Woman Who Fell to Earth", a 2018 episode of Doctor Who
