= Peter Burra =

British writer and critic

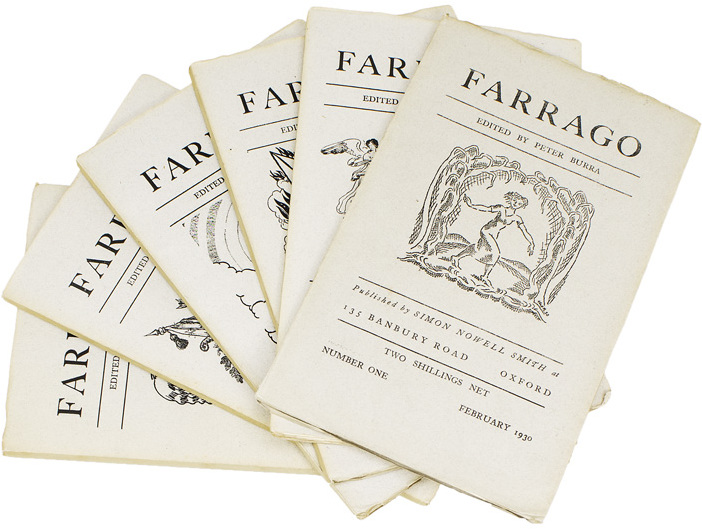
Farrago, published by Simon Nowell Smith

Peter Burra (1909 – 27 April 1937) was a British writer and critic, the author of "The Novels of E. M. Forster".

== Early life ==
Peter Burra and his twin sister Nella Burra were close friend with Peter Pears; Burra and Pears went to school together at Lancing College and then Oxford University. Helen "Nella" Pomfret Burra (1909–1999) was a singer and actress who worked with the Group Theatre productions. She married actor and director John Moody (1906–1993). At Lancing College, both Pears, piano, and Burra, violin, were members of the Lancing Chamber Music Society.

== Career ==
From February 1930 to June 1931, Burra edited the literary magazine Farrago, published by Simon Nowell Smith. They were 6 numbers in total and the cover designs and plates were by Edward Burra, Albert Rutherston, Oliver Holt and Laurence Whistler. In issue 5 there is also a headpiece by Rex Whistler. The magazine published early poems by Evelyn Waugh and Cecil Day-Lewis, plus contributions by A.J.A. Symons, John Sparrow, Max Beerbohm and Lord David Cecil.

Burra was an essayist; in 1934, in "The Novels of E.M. Forster", he was the first to highlight E. M. Forster's highly musical technique of employing textual leitmotifs, which he referred to as "rhythm". He would go on and write the introduction to Everyman edition of A Passage to India (1942), released after his death. E.M.Forster said of him that he was "the best critic of his generation".

Also in 1934, Burra wrote Van Gogh, published by Duckworth, and in 1936, again with Duckworth, he published Wordsworth, Great Lives. These two biographies established his reputation as a writer.

Burra was a special correspondent for The Times, and it was while in Barcelona to cover the ISCM Music Festival that he met Benjamin Britten for the first time; in a letter dated 1 May 1936, Burra tells Pears he has also met Britten's close friend Lennox Berkeley. In 1936 Pears was living in Burra's cottage in Bucklebury Common.

Burra was a book reviewer for The Spectator.

In November 1936, Burra reviewed "The Agamemnon of Aeschylus" produced by Rupert Doone with music of Britten; the review appeared in the Group Theatre Paper.

== Personal life ==
Burra was friends with both Peter Pears and Benjamin Britten at different times. Pears lived with him at Bucklebury Common and Britten, while referring to him, used the word "Dear", which was "Britten's blanket term for his intimate friends"; he used the same word in regard to Peter Pears and Lennox Berkeley.

Burra was killed on 27 April 1937, when a light aircraft flown by a friend crashed near Bucklebury Common, Berkshire. It was Burra's first flying lesson. After visiting Spain, and a few days before the bombing of Guernica, he was hoping to help provide air-cover to Republicans.

It was while sorting Burra's personal effects that the relationship between Pears and Britten started.

== Legacy ==
Benjamin Britten wrote an unpublished song, "Not Even Summer Yet", for Peter Pears dedicated to Burra. Pears sang it for the first time accompanied by Gordon Thorne during a concert to the memory of Burra. The song was later revived by tenor Neil Mackle accompanied at the piano by Iain Burnside, at Wigmore Hall, London, on 22 November 1983.

Lennox Berkeley and Benjamin Britten dedicated the orchestral suite, Mont Juic (1937) "In memory of Peter Burra".
