= Mont Juic (suite) =

- by: Lennox Berkeley; Benjamin Britten
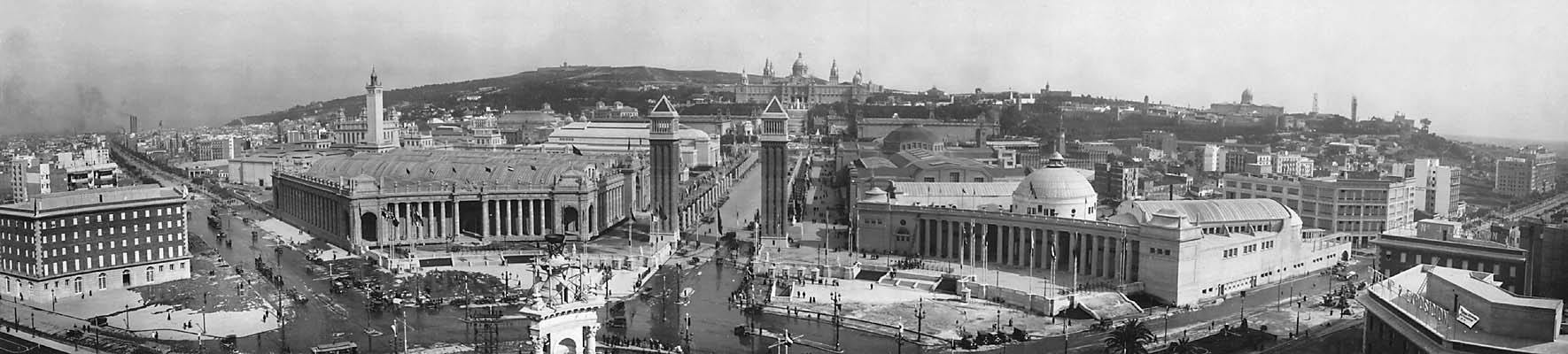
- Montjuïc, Barcelona (1929)
- Genre: Suite
- Composed: 1937

Premiere
- Date: 27 June 1938, BBC Symphony Orchestra

Mont Juic, suite of Catalan dances for orchestra (Catalan pronunciation: [muɲʒuˈik]), was written jointly by Lennox Berkeley and Benjamin Britten in 1937. Named for Montjuïc, it was published as Berkeley's Op. 9 and Britten's Op. 12.

== Background ==
Berkeley and Britten both attended the International Society for Contemporary Music (ISCM) Festival in Barcelona, Spain in 1936. Berkeley had been living abroad for some years and had never previously met Britten. They soon became close friends. Another friend of Berkeley's, Peter Burra, was also present, and he also became a friend of Britten's.

At the Festival, Britten accompanied the violinist Antonio Brosa in the first performance of his Suite for violin and piano, Op. 6. The highlight of the Festival, which Britten, Berkeley and Burra all attended, was the posthumous world premiere of Alban Berg's Violin Concerto, "To the memory of an angel", which was performed on Sunday 19 April, with the soloist Louis Krasner, under the conductor Hermann Scherchen.

The next day, the trio visited Montjuïc, the hill that dominates the Barcelona landscape. On the Wednesday, 22 April, they attended a Festival of Folk Dance on the Exposition Grounds on Montjuïc, where they heard various Catalan folk tunes. Later that day Berkeley and Britten jotted down some of the melodies in a Barcelona café.

The following year, back in England, they decided to jointly write an orchestral suite based on some of the dance melodies they had heard on Montjuïc. They named it simply Mont Juic, and dedicated it "In memory of Peter Burra", who was killed in an aircraft crash in April 1937. The work was written between 6 April and 12 December 1937.

== Instrumentation ==
The instrumentation consists of: two flutes (one doubling piccolo), two oboes, two clarinets in B♭, alto saxophone (ad lib.), tenor saxophone (ad lib.), two bassoons (one doubling double bassoon), four horns, two trumpets in B♭, three trombones, tuba, timpani, glockenspiel, xylophone, cymbals, bass drum, tenor drum, side drum, triangle, tambourine, tam-tam, harp, and strings.

== Movements ==
The suite has four movements:

1. Andante maestoso
2. Allegro grazioso
3. Lament: Andante moderato ("Barcelona, July 1936")
4. Allegro molto

The two composers chose not to reveal who had written which parts of the music. The manuscript Benjamin Britten submitted to the publisher was written entirely in his hand. In 1980, however, Lennox Berkeley revealed to Peter Dickinson that he had written the first two pieces and Britten the latter two, although they collaborated on the orchestration, the form and other details.

== Homage to Catalonia ==
By the time the work was written, the Spanish Civil War had broken out, and the third movement Lament (in C minor) was written as a tribute to the region of Catalonia. It includes a solo alto saxophone and is based on the Sardana. It is subtitled "Barcelona, July 1936", a clear reference to the Civil War that had broken out on 18 July.

== First performance ==
The first performance of the work was in a BBC radio broadcast on 8 January 1938, by the BBC Symphony Orchestra under Joseph Lewis.

After the performance, Berkeley wrote to Britten, saying I must say that I thought your two pieces more effective than mine. Berkeley also told his son Michael how impressed he was by Britten's "Mozartean dexterity in getting instantly every nuance and decoration down on paper in such a way that, back in England it came bouncing off the page full of life and expression".

Mont Juic has since had many performances and a number of recordings.
