= John Moody =

John Moody may refer to:

- John Moody (actor) (1727?–1812), Irish actor
- John Moody (badminton) (born 1983), badminton player from New Zealand
- John Moody (financial analyst) (1868–1958), U.S. financial analyst and investor
- John Moody (footballer) (1904–1963), English football goalkeeper
- John Moody (governor) (d. 1736), deputy governor of Placentia, Newfoundland
- John Moody (journalist), Fox News executive
- John Moody (opera director) (1906–1993), English opera director
- John M. Moody (died 1884), member of the Utah Territorial Legislature
- John "Big Train" Moody (1917–1995), American football player
- John Moody (Cash Cab)

== See also ==
- John Moodie (1859–1944), Canadian manufacturer
- John Mudie, Scottish footballer
