= Natasha Marsh =

Welsh soprano (born 1975)

Natasha Jane Marsh (born 1975) is a Welsh soprano singer. A highly regarded performer in both opera and oratorio, her debut album, Amour, topped the classical album charts in 2007. She has toured with artists such as G4, Russell Watson, Il Divo and Paul Potts. Her love of football was confirmed when she sang at the 2008 League Cup Final and she has recorded Mozart's "Queen of the Night" aria for ITV's coverage of UEFA Euro 2008.

== Personal life and early career ==
Marsh was born in Brecon, Wales, but moved to Blackborough, near Cullompton, Devon aged eighteen months. Aged 17, she began studying with the renowned singing teacher April Cantelo. Marsh graduated with a First-class Honours degree from Birmingham University and was awarded the Barber Scholarship to study Opera at the Royal College of Music. In 1999 she won the MOCSA (Morriston Orpheus Choir Supporters' Association) Young Welsh Singer of the Year, whose previous winners have included Bryn Terfel and Anthony Stuart Lloyd.

== Operatic debut and professional career ==
Marsh made her debut with Grange Park Opera in Fortunio by Messager and sang the roles of the Governess in Britten's The Turn of the Screw and Donna Elvira on Mozart's Don Giovanni. She also created the title role in Michael Berkeley's opera Jane Eyre for Music Theatre Wales.

She has appeared in Opera Holland Park's La Boheme, sung Micaela in Carmen at the Royal Albert Hall and the First Lady in The Magic Flute with Glyndebourne Touring Opera. She also sang Ilia in Idomeneo for Opera North and the following year sang Pamina for Opera Zuid. She performed in Giordano's Fedora at Opera Holland Park.

Natasha's festival appearances include the Birmingham Early Music Festival, the London Handel Festival, the Beaumarais Festival and at the Teatro Calderón in Spain. Her oratorio work includes Tippett's A Child of our Time, Messiah at the Arlosen Festival, Mozart's Requiem with the BBC Scottish Symphony Orchestra and Silete Venti with the London Handel Festival Orchestra at Windsor Castle. Natasha has performed with Harry Christophers and The Sixteen and made her BBC Proms debut in Handel's Samson. She also performs regularly at Raymond Gubbay's "Classical Spectacular" events at the Royal Albert Hall.

She toured with G4 in December 2006, and "realised one of her dreams" by singing Silent Night with José Carreras on the Royal Albert Hall stage. She toured with Russell Watson in March 2007 and also embarked on a European summer tour with Il Divo. In April, Marsh took part in the first Classic FM web-cast concert alongside Alfie Boe and in May made an appearance at the Classical Brit Awards 2007 ceremony at the Royal Albert Hall.

Marsh in February 2011 went on a Scandinavian tour supporting tenor Paul Potts, 2007 winner of ITV's Britain's Got Talent.

In June 2008, Marsh sang at the House of Commons a song entitled 'I won't light a candle', a specially arranged vocal-arrangement of the theme to Schindler's List to commemorate the 79th anniversary of the birth of Anne Frank.

=== Marsh and football ===
Marsh has also performed at sporting events; at the 2008 Football League Cup Final, she sang the British national anthem before the match. She has recorded Der Hölle Rache (the "Queen of the Night" aria) from Mozart's The Magic Flute for use as ITV's theme music for UEFA Euro 2008. "I was delighted to do it", she said. "I love the passion, beauty and power that football and music share." Marsh said of the arrangement:

I've sung Pamina in opera houses all round Europe, but I'm not a Queen of the Night, with those stratospheric top Fs. So I told ITV we'd have to do an adaptation, because it's not my role. We changed the key, obviously, then they found an arranger to add a different take on it. It's a little bit more brass-heavy than Mozart's original and the orchestration is different. It gives it a more epic quality.

== Discography ==
=== Amour ===
Natasha Marsh signed an exclusive recording contract with EMI Classics in September 2006 and her debut album Amour was released on 19 February 2007. It entered the UK Classical Artist Chart at No.1. Her album has been criticized by opera critics, who were hoping for an album of operatic arias, rather than the "typical specimen of the crossover genre". The album contains some of Marsh's favourite songs and arias, mixing pop tunes, with classical arrangements and some lesser-known arias. Marsh was signed by EMI Classics as a crossover artist, Marsh citing the need to pick music that is "accessible to everybody across a broad spectrum. The challenge has been to find repertoire that isn't too clichéd." Amour was nominated for the Best Album award in the 2008 Classical BRIT awards.

==== Track listing ====
1. "Si Un Jour" (theme from Jean de Florette, based on La Forza Del Destino) - Giuseppe Verdi, arranged Jean-Claude Petit
2. Gymnopédie No. 1 - Erik Satie
3. "Ebben? Ne andrò lontana" (from La Wally) - Alfredo Catalani
4. "Ai Giochi Addio" (love theme from Romeo and Juliet) - Nino Rota, lyrics by Elsa Morante
5. "Autumn Leaves" - Joseph Kosma, lyrics by Johnny Mercer
6. "Mi Mancherai" (theme from Il Postino) - Luis Bacalov
7. Chanson D'Amour, Op.27, No.1 - Gabriel Fauré
8. "He Moves, Eyes Follow" - Jimmy Webb
9. "The First Time Ever I Saw Your Face" - Ewan MacColl
10. "Et Misericordia" (from Magnificat) - John Rutter
11. "La Delaissado" (from Chants d'Auvergne) - Joseph Canteloube
12. "Pur Ti Miro" (from L'incoronazione di Poppea) - Claudio Monteverdi
13. "Les Filles de Cadix" - Léo Delibes
14. Vocalise, Op. 34, No. 14 - Sergei Rachmaninov
