= Nightfall (1988 film) =

- Theatrical poster
- Directed by: Paul Mayersberg
- Written by: Paul Mayersberg
- Based on: "Nightfall" by Isaac Asimov
- Produced by: Julie Corman
- Starring: David Birney; Sarah Douglas; Alexis Kanner; Andra Millian
- Cinematography: Dariusz Wolski
- Edited by: Brent Schoenfeld
- Music by: Frank Serafine
- Production company: New Horizons
- Distributed by: Concorde Pictures
- Release date: April 15, 1988
- Running time: 83 minutes
- Country: United States
- Language: English
- Budget: <$2 million

Nightfall is a 1988 American independent science fiction film written and directed by Paul Mayersberg, based on the 1941 short story of the same name by Isaac Asimov.

== Cast ==
- David Birney as Aton
- Sarah Douglas as Roa
- Alexis Kanner as Sor
- Andra Millian as Ana

== Production ==
Nightfall was the short story which helped establish Isaac Asimov's reputation when it was published in 1941. Julie Corman became aware of it in 1979 when she read a review of an Asimov anthology in the New York Times. She was attracted by a story "about people who have recognizable moral dilemmas", and bought the screen rights. Roger Corman announced in 1980 he would make the film with a reported $6 million budget, co-producing with a German company.

When Asimov turned down the chance to adapt the story himself, Julie Corman approached Paul Mayersberg, then best known for writing The Man Who Fell to Earth. He passed so she tried a number of different writers.

"The problem was getting a script that had the essence of Nightfall and also had good, involving characters", says Corman. "Some of the scripts that we developed were excellent on the science-fiction elements, but they weren't very visual. In other versions, the characters were incredibly good but Asimov's philosophical war of words had been played down. Along the way. we encountered the usual money problems, so the project was put on the back burner."

In July 1987 Corman eventually went back to Mayersberg after seeing his directorial debut, Captive (1986). Mayersberg agreed to write the script if he could direct. Corman agreed. Mayersberg wrote the script in five weeks in London and the film was shot over an eight-week period in October 1987. The film was one of the most artistically bold ever made by New Horizons.

Mayersberg said he believed "film is not a very good medium for science fiction, it's visual, and therefore not very imaginative... film can only show you what exists, that which we can already see with our eyes, If you want to imagine a city in space, you have to build a model— and frankly, it looks like a model."

The only characters retained from the story were Aton, an astronomer and leader of the city, and Sor, leader of the Believers (called the Cultists in the story). Mayersberg created the female character of Roa, who was once married to Aton but left him to become one of Sor's disciples. Maybersberg said the two men stood for "the relationship between science and religion as a means of explaining the world. As for the Day of Judgment, do you believe the religious view or do you subscribe to the scientific view that it's nothing more than an eclipse and is a part of the movement in the universe?".

The number of suns was reduced from six in the story to three.

The film was shot in an organic architectural development in Arizona called Arcosanti. Scenes were also shot in Cosanti, just outside Scottsdale, and in the Tonto National Forest. Some Arcosanti residents appeared as extras.

Mayersberg said, "Instead of hardware and lasers, I used strings and elastic bands and crystal swords, whatever the people who lived on the planet could find that might exist or, in the case of something like a kite, could build. I wanted to omit the present totally, and work on merging the past and future."

Rain fell for three out of the five weeks of shooting.

"Nightfall was, for me, about a state of mind, not about a sequence of events", Mayersberg says. "I tried to present that in terms of the characters' lives and the way in which the film is constructed, which is not so much in dialogue as image. I intended the film to be about ways one can approach a life crisis. What do you do? Do you go mad, do you become rational, cowardly, throw reason to the winds? Do you try to figure it out, do you suddenly become religious? This is a story where there's a sort of nervous breakdown in the society where these people live, and how they cope with it."

== Reception ==
The Los Angeles Times wrote that "With a low, low budget and high, high pretensions, Nightfall... dims and crashes down faster and harder than an Alaskan winter sunset. Genre fans and reluctant dates alike may find it as insufferable a sit-through as any science-fiction movie this decade."

Julie Corman later said it was one project of hers she wished she could remake with a bigger budget. "On a low budget, it was kind of hard to create that world", she said.

== Notes ==
- Counts, Kyle (September 1988). "Watching the Nightfall". Starlog (134 ed.).
