= Beth Harmon =

Fictional character in The Queen's Gambit

- The Queen's Gambit character
- Anya Taylor-Joy as Beth Harmon in The Queen's Gambit
- First appearance: The Queen's Gambit (1983 novel)
- Created by: Walter Tevis
- Adapted by: Scott Frank
- Portrayed by: Anya Taylor-Joy; Isla Johnston (age 8); Annabeth Kelly (age 5)

In-universe information
- Full name: Elizabeth Harmon
- Nickname: Beth
- Gender: Female
- Occupation: Chess player
- Family: Alma Wheatley (adoptive mother; deceased); Allston Wheatley (adoptive father); Alice Harmon (biological mother; deceased); Paul Harmon (biological father)
- Origin: Kentucky
- Nationality: American

Beth Harmon is a fictional American character and the main protagonist in the Walter Tevis novel The Queen's Gambit and the Netflix drama miniseries of the same name, in which she is portrayed by Anya Taylor-Joy. Taylor-Joy's performance as Beth was critically acclaimed. She was nominated for the Primetime Emmy Award for Outstanding Lead Actress in a Limited Series or Movie. She also won the Golden Globe Award for Best Actress – Miniseries or Television Film and the Screen Actors Guild Award for Outstanding Performance by a Female Actor in a Miniseries or Television Movie.

== Fictional biography ==
Beth Harmon is orphaned at age eight when her mother dies in a car crash. Growing up in an orphanage in Kentucky, she is taught chess by the custodian Mr. Shaibel, and soon becomes a chess prodigy. While at the orphanage, she struggles with an addiction to tranquilizers. In her teens she is adopted and begins her rapid rise in the chess world, eventually challenging the top Soviet players. As her skill and profile grows, so does her dependency on tranquilizers and eventually alcohol.

== Concept and inspiration ==
Diana Lanni, a New York chess player contemporary with Tevis who represented the United States at the 1982 Chess Olympiad in Lucerne, suggested she was at least in part the inspiration for the Beth Harmon character, and that her friend grandmaster Larry Kaufman was the inspiration for the book's Harry Beltik character. Lanni thinks it is plausible she got Tevis' attention when playing at the outdoor tables at Washington Square Park as the only woman, and as someone with depression and addiction problems. Other real life chess players said to have inspired the character include Bobby Fischer and Tevis himself. Tevis, however, explicitly denied any of his characters were based on any real life people. He also said he found it more interesting to write a female character.

== Television adaptation ==
After several aborted attempts to bring the novel to screen, Netflix announced they had acquired the rights, with Anya Taylor-Joy confirmed as the show's lead, on March 19, 2019, with a Twitter post by Netflix Queue.

== See also ==
- Judit Polgar, the female chess player who has come closest to challenging for the World Chess Championship
