= Deborah Rogers =

British literary agent (1938–2014)

The Right Honourable The Lady Berkeley of Knighton
- Born: Deborah Jane Coltman Rogers; 6 April 1938; London, England
- Died: 30 April 2014 (aged 76)
- Occupation: Literary agent
- Spouse: Michael Berkeley
- Children: 1
- Awards: Lifetime Achievement Award in International Publishing at the London Book Fair

Deborah Jane Coltman Rogers, Baroness Berkeley of Knighton (6 April 1938 – 30 April 2014) was a British literary agent, who founded her own agency in 1967.

== Biography ==
Born at her parents' London home in Thurloe Square, South Kensington, Rogers was one of six children; her mother Stella Moore was an actress, while her father worked in the City of London. She attended Hatherop Castle School in Gloucestershire, but did not go to university.

Her agency, originally Deborah Rogers Ltd, was established in 1967. Pat White soon joined, and the two women were joined by a third partner, Gill Coleridge, two decades later. At the end of her life, Rogers was the chairman of Rogers, Coleridge and White.

Among the authors Rogers represented were A. S. Byatt, Ian McEwan and Peter Carey. Earlier in her career, she had represented Angela Carter, and (before he joined Andrew Wylie's agency) Salman Rushdie. Shortly after the professional breach, Rogers offered Rushdie her second home as a refuge from the February 1989 fatwā issued by Ayatollah Khomeini, which called for Rushdie to be killed. The remote farm in Powys, Wales, was used by Rushdie during his decade in hiding.

Rogers was presented with the Lifetime Achievement Award in International Publishing at the London Book Fair in April 2014. The award was presented by another of her clients, Kazuo Ishiguro, who had been introduced to Rogers by Angela Carter. Ishiguro said of Rogers that "she taught me to be a writer".

Rogers married the composer Michael Berkeley in 1979; the couple had an adopted daughter. Rogers died from a heart attack in 2014, aged 76.
