= Symphony No. 2 (Berkeley) =

Lennox Berkeley composed his Symphony No. 2 in 1958. The work was commissioned by the City of Birmingham Symphony, who premiered it under Andrzej Panufnik in February 1959. Berkeley revised the symphony in 1976 for its first recording, by the London Philharmonic under Nicholas Braithwaite.

== Structure ==
The composition is in four movements:

1. Lento – Allegro
2. Allegro vivace
3. Lento
4. Allegro

Typical playing time is around 27 minutes
