= The Steps of the Sun =

1983 novel by Walter Tevis

- Author: Walter Tevis
- Publication date: 1983

The Steps of the Sun is a 1983 science fiction novel by the American author Walter Tevis. It is about a future energy crisis, and a world in which China has become the leading superpower.

== Literary reference ==
The title is taken from William Blake's poem, "Ah! Sun-flower":

Ah Sun-flower! weary of time,
Who countest the steps of the Sun
Seeking after that sweet golden clime
Where the travellers journey is done.

== Reception ==
Reviewer Dave Langford said, "Well written and characterized, this has an old-fashioned feel despite up-to-date lack of inhibitions." Dave Pringle's review said "I found this an irritating book, implausible, overlong, outdated and would-be risque."

== Reviews ==
- Review by Faren Miller (1983) in Locus, #273 October 1983
- Review by Brian Stableford (1984) in Foundation, #30 March 1984
- Review by Tom Easton (1984) in Analog Science Fiction/Science Fact, May 1984
- Review by David Barrett (1984) in Vector 121
- Review by David Pettus (1985) in Thrust, #22, Summer 1985
