= Berkeley Ensemble =

British chamber music ensemble

- Origin: UK
- Genres: Chamber music ensemble
- Years active: 2008 – present
- Website: www.berkeleyensemble.co.uk

The Berkeley Ensemble is a British chamber music ensemble that explores little-known twentieth- and twenty first-century British chamber music alongside a more established repertoire.

Founded in 2008 by members of Southbank Sinfonia, the ensemble reached the finals of the 2009 Royal Over-Seas League music competition and has since performed regularly in the UK and abroad.

Their recordings and performances are regularly featured in the national press. Their album Lennox Berkeley: Chamber Works was selected by BBC Music Magazine as Chamber Choice in 2015, and Lennox Berkeley: Stabat Mater was nominated for a Gramophone Magazine Classical Music Award in 2017.

The ensemble revived the Cobbett Competition for chamber music composition (as The New Cobbett Competition) in 2014, with Sequenza for string quartet by Samuel Lewis as the first winner.

Since 2016 the Berkeley Ensemble has curated the annual Little Venice Music Festival in London. It celebrated its 10th anniversary with a performance at the Purcell Room in September 2018.

The ensemble is named after the British composers Lennox Berkeley and Michael Berkeley. Its patrons are Michael Berkeley and Petroc Trelawny.

== Albums ==
The ensemble has released a number of albums, most notably:

- Cobbett’s Legacy: The New Cobbett Prize for Chamber Music (2019, Resonus Classics) received a 4-star review in The Guardian
- Winter Fragments (2018, Resonus Classics) was praised for the ensemble’s “endlessly responsive playing” by Fiona Maddocks in The Observer
- Stabat Mater: Sacred Choral Music by Lennox & Michael Berkeley (2016, Delphian Records) was nominated for a Gramophone Award
- Lennox Berkeley: Chamber Works (2015, Resonus Classics) received a 5-star review in BBC Music Magazine and positive reviews in the Telegraph and Sunday Times
- Clarion Call: Music for Septet and Octet (2014, Resonus Classics) received positive reviews in The Observer, Gramophone Magazine, The Strad, and Classical Ear.
