= Jane Eyre (Berkeley) =

Jane Eyre is an opera in two acts by Michael Berkeley to a libretto by David Malouf, premiered in 2000 by Music Theatre Wales at the Cheltenham Festival.

== Roles ==
- Jane Eyre – soprano
- Adèle – soprano
- Mrs Fairfax – mezzo-soprano
- Mrs Rochester – contralto
- Rochester – bass

== Recording ==
- Jane Eyre – Natasha Marsh (Jane Eyre), Fflur Wyn (Adèle), Beverley Mills (Mrs Fairfax), Emily Bauer-Jones (Mrs Rochester), Andrew Slater (Rochester); The Music Theatre Wales Ensemble, Michael Rafferty (conductor); Linbury Theatre (Royal Opera House), 2001, CHAN 9983
