= The Man Who Fell to Earth (novel) =

1963 science fiction novel by Walter Tevis

- First edition cover
- Author: Walter Tevis
- Cover artist: Diane Dillon and Leo Dillon
- Language: English
- Genre: Science fiction
- Publisher: Gold Medal Books
- Publication date: 1963
- Publication place: United States
- Media type: Print (paperback original)
- Pages: 144

The Man Who Fell to Earth is a 1963 science-fiction novel by American writer Walter Tevis. Published by Gold Medal Books as a paperback original, it was Tevis's second novel, following The Hustler. The novel follows Thomas Jerome Newton, an extraterrestrial from the drought-stricken planet Anthea, who comes to Earth hoping to build a spacecraft that can save the surviving members of his species.

The novel has been discussed as one of Tevis's most personal works. Tevis later described it as a disguised autobiography, connecting Newton's alienness to his own experiences of childhood illness, displacement, and estrangement. Critical discussion has also emphasized the novel's treatment of loneliness, alcoholism, failed assimilation, corporate power, and the destructive force of human institutions.

Contemporary reviewers gave the novel a mixed-to-positive response, praising Tevis's handling of Newton while sometimes treating the alien-visitor premise as familiar. Later criticism has been more favorable, placing the novel within both science-fiction and literary traditions and distinguishing it from more conventional adventure or hard-science-fiction narratives.

The Man Who Fell to Earth has been adapted several times. The best-known adaptation is the 1976 film directed by Nicolas Roeg and starring David Bowie as Newton. Later adaptations include a 1987 ABC television pilot aired as a television film, the stage musical Lazarus, and a 2022 Showtime television series.

== Background and publication ==
The Man Who Fell to Earth was published in 1963 by Gold Medal Books, an imprint of Fawcett Publications. It was Tevis's second novel, appearing about four years after The Hustler, and was issued as a paperback original after hardcover publishers declined it.

Tevis later described The Man Who Fell to Earth as a disguised autobiography. He connected Thomas Jerome Newton, the novel's alien protagonist, to his own childhood experience of illness, weakness, and dislocation, particularly the move from San Francisco to Kentucky that left him feeling as though he had come from another planet. Tevis was living in Mexico and drinking heavily while finishing the book, a biographical echo of Newton's own alcoholic decline.

The novel was reissued by Gregg Press in 1978, with an introduction by Norman Spinrad. By the time of that reissue, the 1976 film adaptation starring David Bowie had brought new attention to Tevis's story. Later editions included a 1999 Buccaneer Books edition and a Vintage paperback published by Penguin Random House in 2022. The novel was also adapted as a 1987 television film, the stage musical Lazarus, and a 2022 Showtime television series.

== Plot ==
Thomas Jerome Newton, an extraterrestrial from the planet Anthea, arrives alone on Earth and assumes the identity of a human businessman. Anthea has been devastated by nuclear war, drought, and environmental collapse, leaving only a small number of survivors. Newton plans to use Earth's resources and industry to build a spacecraft capable of transporting the remaining Antheans to Earth. Although he looks mostly human, Earth's heavier gravity and atmosphere are physically difficult for him, and he must conceal his identity while carrying out his plan.

Newton lands in Kentucky and begins establishing himself quietly. He sells valuable items to obtain money and then contacts Oliver Farnsworth, a patent attorney. Newton brings advanced Anthean scientific knowledge with him and turns it into a series of valuable inventions. Farnsworth helps him patent these technologies and organize the legal and financial structures needed to profit from them. Newton's inventions quickly generate enormous wealth, and he founds World Enterprises, a corporation built around products far beyond ordinary human technology.

Newton keeps his purpose hidden. To the public, he is an eccentric but brilliant industrialist. In reality, World Enterprises exists to finance and build the spacecraft that will save the Antheans. Newton directs the company's profits into research, land purchases, and industrial development while avoiding unnecessary public attention. His secrecy protects the mission, but the scale of his company's success also attracts curiosity and suspicion.

As Newton spends more time on Earth, he becomes increasingly isolated. His physical condition makes ordinary life difficult, and his separation from both humans and Antheans weighs on him. He becomes involved with Betty Jo, who provides him with companionship. Through her and through ordinary social contact, Newton is drawn further into human habits. He begins drinking alcohol and gradually loses control over it.

Nathan Bryce, a scientist whose career has stalled, becomes interested in Newton's company and its inventions. The technology produced by World Enterprises appears too advanced to have ordinary human origins. Bryce investigates Newton and eventually concludes that he is not human. Newton confirms the truth and explains the condition of Anthea, the purpose of his mission, and the reason for his secrecy. Bryce becomes one of the few people who knows what Newton is attempting to do.

Newton's project continues, but his position becomes more vulnerable. World Enterprises has grown too large and too important to escape official attention. The government becomes suspicious of Newton's wealth, secrecy, and technological power. Surveillance increases, and Newton's movements are watched. Before he can complete his spacecraft and carry out the rescue of the Antheans, he is taken into custody.

While detained, Newton is interrogated and medically examined. The authorities study his unusual physiology, and the examinations permanently blind him. His captivity also delays the spacecraft project and disrupts the timetable on which the rescue mission depends. By the time Newton is released, his health, resolve, and practical ability to finish the mission have been badly damaged.

After his release, Newton remains wealthy, but his wealth no longer serves its original purpose. He is unable to complete the spacecraft, and his dependence on alcohol worsens. The surviving Antheans remain beyond his reach, and Newton becomes stranded on Earth. Bryce later encounters him again and finds him changed from the figure who had first built World Enterprises. Newton has made a recording intended as a final message to Anthea, but he can no longer return home or bring his people to Earth.

The novel ends with Newton still living under his public identity as Thomas Jerome Newton, but the rescue mission has failed. He is left on Earth, blind, isolated, and unable to save the last survivors of his world.

== Themes and analysis ==
In later comments on the novel, Tevis treated Newton less as a distant speculative figure than as an expression of his own estrangement. Newton's status as an alien visitor drew on Tevis's memories of childhood illness, physical weakness, and the dislocation he felt after moving from San Francisco to Kentucky. Tevis also said the book was, for him, about becoming an alcoholic, linking Newton's separation from human life to a more ordinary and self-destructive form of estrangement. Michael Dirda similarly characterizes the novel as a story of loneliness, alcohol dependency, and despair, in which Newton's mission is gradually overtaken by isolation and drink.

Newton's mission is framed less as invasion than as refuge and rescue. He arrives as a humanoid alien from a dying species, offering Anthean science in exchange for asylum for his people, but his plan is gradually undone by human bureaucracy, xenophobia, assimilation, and institutional violence. Andrew M. Butler places Newton within an alien-messiah tradition and connects the novel to Cold War and Space Race anxieties. The novel has also been classified, along with Nicolas Roeg's film adaptation, as an "infiltration" narrative rather than an invasion narrative, with Newton's presence exposing the society he enters rather than threatening it militarily.

The novel treats technology through law, commerce, and ownership rather than invention alone. Newton's Anthean knowledge becomes effective on Earth only after it is converted into patents, corporate structures, and profitable consumer products. Jorge L. Contreras classifies the novel within legal science fiction categories including personhood, encounters with the other, corporatism, and intellectual property, and identifies patent law as one of the mechanisms by which Newton turns alien science into wealth through World Enterprises. That machinery is central to the novel's treatment of power: Newton's rescue project depends on the same economic and institutional systems that eventually help defeat it.

The Man Who Fell to Earth has also been discussed as science fiction that uses its premise less for technological spectacle than for social and moral examination. Baird Searles described the novel as a mainstream work using a science-fictional device to make a point about human civilization and its effect on an alien observer. Paul Mayersberg, who wrote the screenplay for Roeg's film adaptation, similarly said that Tevis's book was not conventional hard science fiction and lacked the machinery and hardware associated with that mode. Later criticism has emphasized the novel's concern with loneliness, despair, alcohol dependency, and moral failure, treating its alien-visitor plot as something darker and more inward than a conventional adventure story.

== Reception ==
Contemporary reviews treated The Man Who Fell to Earth as a familiar alien-visitor story handled with unusual seriousness and control. In Analog Science Fact & Science Fiction, P. Schuyler Miller wrote that the premise was not new but praised Tevis's handling of Newton as a fully developed character rather than a simple device for the plot. Miller also objected to some of the novel's scientific details, particularly its treatment of Anthea and related astronomical questions. In The Magazine of Fantasy & Science Fiction, Avram Davidson gave a more mixed assessment, finding much of the novel familiar and less successful than Tevis's earlier story "Far From Home", while describing its ending as a poignant surprise.

Later discussion was more favorable to the novel's seriousness and literary reach. Baird Searles, reviewing the Gregg Press reissue in 1979, connected the book's renewed fame to Nicolas Roeg's film adaptation and described the novel as both superior science fiction and effective literature. Joe De Bolt included The Man Who Fell to Earth in a list of outstanding science-fiction books from 1927 to 1979, summarizing it as the story of an alien who comes to Earth seeking help for an ancient, wise, and dying people. The reissue-era response helped position the novel not merely as the source for the Bowie film but as one of Tevis's significant works in its own right.

Retrospective accounts have emphasized the novel's place in Tevis's reputation as a science-fiction writer. The Encyclopedia of Science Fiction states that the book brought Tevis wider notice in the genre, and later critics have continued to single it out among his major novels. Writing retrospectively in The Washington Post, Michael Dirda placed The Man Who Fell to Earth in conversation with works such as Heart of Darkness, The Stranger, and The Day the Earth Stood Still. Its later reputation also extended beyond direct reviews of the novel: a 2023 Kirkus Reviews review invoked The Man Who Fell to Earth as a classic point of comparison for later alien-visitor fiction.

== Adaptations ==
=== 1976 film ===
The Man Who Fell to Earth was adapted into a 1976 British film directed by Nicolas Roeg and written by Paul Mayersberg. The film starred David Bowie as Thomas Jerome Newton, with Candy Clark, Rip Torn, and Buck Henry among the cast. The film became the best-known screen version of Tevis's novel and helped keep Newton associated in popular culture with Bowie's performance.

Roeg's film retained the novel's central premise of an alien visitor trying to save his dying planet, but reshaped the material into a more elliptical screen work. The Encyclopedia of Science Fiction describes the film as replacing the novel's clearer narrative with a nonlinear structure. Later analysis has treated both Tevis's novel and Roeg's film as "infiltration" narratives rather than invasion stories, with Newton's presence exposing corporate and political systems instead of threatening Earth through conquest.

=== 1987 television film ===
The Man Who Fell to Earth was adapted in 1987 as a television film made for ABC. The project was intended as a television series, but only the pilot aired. It was directed by Robert J. Roth, written for television by Richard Kletter, and executive produced by David Gerber. The cast included Lewis Smith, Wil Wheaton, Annie Potts, James Laurenson, Robert Picardo, Bruce McGill, and Beverly D'Angelo. The adaptation substantially altered Tevis's story. The Encyclopedia of Science Fiction describes the 1987 version as changing the plot and dropping the theme of alien corruption that had shaped both the novel and Nicolas Roeg's 1976 film.

=== Lazarus stage musical ===
Lazarus, a stage musical by David Bowie and Enda Walsh, extended the Newton story to the stage. The production was directed by Ivo van Hove and presented by New York Theatre Workshop during its 2015–16 season, running from November 18, 2015, to January 20, 2016. NYTW described the musical as inspired by Tevis's novel and centered on Thomas Newton.

After its New York run, Lazarus transferred to London. The Guardian described it as one of Bowie's final projects and reported that Michael C. Hall reprised the role of Thomas Newton for the London production. The London staging ran at Kings Cross Theatre from October 25, 2016, to January 22, 2017, with Hall, Michael Esper, and Sophia Anne Caruso returning from the New York production.

=== 2022 television series ===
The Man Who Fell to Earth was adapted for television as a series that premiered on Showtime on April 24, 2022. The series was created by Jenny Lumet and Alex Kurtzman and was described as inspired by Tevis's novel and Roeg's 1976 film adaptation. It starred Chiwetel Ejiofor and Naomie Harris, with Bill Nighy appearing as Thomas Jerome Newton.

The series treated the earlier story as background rather than simply retelling the novel. Lumet described it as taking place 45 years after the events of the novel and film, while Entertainment Weekly described the series as continuing the story associated with the 1976 film. The Encyclopedia of Science Fiction similarly identifies the series as a sequel to the original book and film, set decades later.
