= Captive (1986 film) =

1986 film by Paul Mayersberg

- Directed by: Paul Mayersberg
- Written by: Paul Mayersberg
- Produced by: Don Boyd
- Starring: Oliver Reed; Irina Brook
- Music by: Michael Berkeley, The Edge and Michael Brook
- Production company: Virgin Films
- Release date: 1986
- Country: United Kingdom/France
- Language: English
- Budget: less than £2 million

Captive is a 1986 Anglo-French cinema film loosely based on the experiences of American actress Patty Hearst.

== Plot ==
Gregory Le Vay is a wealthy business man whose daughter Rowena is kidnapped by a terrorist group. Through psychological manipulation she is subordinated by them and led from the cultural and emotional imprisonment of her former life to the so-called liberation of theirs.

== Cast ==
- Irina Brook as Rowena Le Vay
- Oliver Reed as Gregory Le Vay
- Xavier Dulec
- Hiro Arai

== Production ==
Paul Mayersberg was a writer whose credits included several films with Nic Roeg. He said "I deliberately chose a familiar subject so you thought you knew what would happen next. That allowed more freedom from narrative concerns... The script is only a transcript of a dream."

Filming took place in late 1985 under the title Heroine with finance coming from several sources, including Virgin Films, and French companies. Filming took six weeks. Post production took place in Paris.

The film was Mike Southern's first as cinematographer. He recalled Mayersberg "was intense, intellectual and gave me a lot of aesthetic space to work in despite me being a newcomer to movies."

Mayersberg said the film was "only English in the sense it's being made in England's green and pleasant land. It reflects English values, such as a quality of reserve, to the extent that I possess them myself."

Four of the main actors were novices - two being French and one Japanese. "I chose them because I liked the idea of a weird family whose only shared language was emotional," Mayersberg declared.

He added, "I wanted people to feel about Captive how I used to feel about films I liked - haunted. Films are best when they're 90 minute dreams." Southern wrote that "It's a film about change, about discovery of self and the rejection of received values. But it is also a fairy-tale, a nightmare, an operatic fantasy in which unreality holds sway. Oliver Reed came to us with a fearsome "reputation" but was a delight to work with."

== Soundtrack ==
Music was contributed by Michael Berkeley, with a soundtrack album being provided by the Edge and Michael Brook, featuring Sinéad O'Connor singing on one track. The Edge had wanted to write soundtracks; he contacted David Puttnam who introduced The Edge to producer Don Boyd, who was making Captive.

== Release ==
The Observer called it "hollow, pretentious". LA Weekly felt it was an "impressive directorial debut". Sight and Sound felt it was " a more than promising first feature" but criticised the acting except for Reed.

The Sunday Telegraph called it "glossy, pretentious rubbish." The Evening Standard called it "immured and lifeless". "The film at least has style and imagination," wrote The Guardian.

Filmink argued "The movie doesn’t quite work (the cast aren’t all up to it) but it is worth a watch: it’s full of style, Reed is always watchable, and you see Irina Brook from many different angles (it’s very Roeg-like in that way, i.e. pervy)."

The film led to Julie Corman offering Mayersberg the chance to make Nightfall (1988).
