= Walter Tevis =

American writer (1928–1984)

- Walter and Jamie Tevis in 1960
- Born: Walter Stone Tevis Jr. February 28, 1928; San Francisco, California, U.S.
- Died: August 9, 1984 (aged 56); New York City, New York, U.S.
- Occupations: Novelist, short story writer
- Spouse(s): Jamie Griggs Tevis, Eleanora Tevis
- Children: William Tevis, Julie Tevis
- Writing career
- Period: 1955–1984
- Genres: Fiction, science fiction
- Website: waltertevis.org

Walter Stone Tevis Jr. (/ˈtɛvɪs/; February 28, 1928 – August 9, 1984) was an American novelist and screenwriter. Three of his six novels were adapted into major films: The Hustler, The Color of Money and The Man Who Fell to Earth. A fourth, The Queen’s Gambit, was adapted into a miniseries with the same title and shown on Netflix in 2020. His books have been translated into at least 18 languages.

== Early life ==
Tevis was born in San Francisco, California, in 1928 to Anna Elizabeth "Betty" (née Bacon) and Walter Stone Tevis, an appraiser, growing up in the Sunset District, across the street from Golden Gate Park. His sister, Betty, was born in 1925.

He developed a rheumatic heart condition, so his parents placed him in the Stanford Children's Convalescent home (where he was given heavy doses of phenobarbital), for a year, during which time they returned to Kentucky, where the Tevis family had been given an early land grant in Madison County. Walter traveled across country alone by train at age 11 to rejoin his family in Kentucky. He made friends with Toby Kavanaugh, a fellow high school student, and learned to shoot pool in the Kavanaugh mansion in Lawrenceburg. In the library there, he read science fiction for the first time. They remained lifelong friends. Kavanaugh later became the owner of a pool room in Lexington, which would have an impact on Tevis's writing.

Tevis joined the Navy on his seventeenth birthday. He became a carpenter's mate, serving on the USS Hamul in Okinawa.

After his discharge, he graduated from Model Laboratory School in Kentucky in 1945. He entered the University of Kentucky, where he received B.A. (1949) and M.A. (1954) degrees in English literature and studied with A. B. Guthrie Jr., the author of The Big Sky. While a student there, Tevis worked in a pool hall and published a story about pool written for Guthrie's class. He later attended the Iowa Writers' Workshop, where he received an MFA in creative writing in 1960.

After graduation, Tevis wrote for the Kentucky Highway Department. He taught classes in fields from the sciences and English to physical education in small-town Kentucky high schools in Science Hill, Hawesville, Irvine, and Carlisle. He also taught at Northern Kentucky University, the University of Kentucky, and Southern Connecticut State University.

Tevis taught English literature and creative writing at Ohio University in Athens, Ohio, from 1965 to 1978, where he was named University Professor. Tevis was a member of the Authors Guild.

== Career ==
=== Short stories ===
Tevis wrote more than two dozen short stories for a variety of magazines. "The Big Hustle," his pool hall story for Collier's (August 5, 1955), was illustrated by Denver Gillen. It was followed by short stories in The American Magazine, Bluebook, Cosmopolitan, Esquire, Galaxy Science Fiction, Playboy, Redbook and The Saturday Evening Post.

=== Novels ===
His first novel, The Hustler, was published by Harper & Row in 1959. Tevis followed it with The Man Who Fell to Earth, published in 1963. Tevis drew from elements of his childhood in The Man Who Fell to Earth, as noted by James Sallis, writing in The Boston Globe:

On the surface, Man is the tale of an alien who comes to earth to save his own civilization and, through adversity, distraction, and loss of faith ("I want to... But not enough"), fails. Just beneath the surface, it might be read as a parable of 1950s conventionalism and of the Cold War. One of the many other things it is, in Tevis's own words, is "a very disguised autobiography," the tale of his removal as a child from San Francisco, "the city of light," to rural Kentucky, and of the childhood illness that long confined him to bed, leaving him, once recovered, weak, fragile, and apart. It was also – as he realized only after writing it – about his becoming an alcoholic. Beyond that, it is, of course, a Christian parable, and a portrait of the artist. It is, finally, one of the most heartbreaking books I know, a threnody on great ambition and terrible failure, and an evocation of man's absolute, unabridgeable aloneness.

During his time teaching at Ohio University, Tevis became aware that the level of literacy among students was falling at an alarming rate. That observation gave him the idea for Mockingbird (1980), set in a grim and decaying New York City in the 25th century. The population is declining, no one can read, and robots rule over the drugged, illiterate humans. With the birth rate dropping, the end of the species seems a possibility. Tevis was a nominee for the Nebula Award for Best Novel in 1980 for Mockingbird. During one of his last televised interviews, he revealed that PBS once planned a production of Mockingbird as a follow-up to their 1979 film of Ursula K. Le Guin's The Lathe of Heaven.

Tevis also wrote The Steps of the Sun (1983), The Queen's Gambit (1983), and The Color of Money (1984), a sequel to The Hustler. His short stories were collected in Far from Home in 1981.

==== Adaptations ====
Three of Tevis's six novels were adapted for major motion pictures, and one for a TV mini-series. The Hustler, directed by Robert Rossen, and The Color of Money, directed by Martin Scorsese, followed the escapades of fictional pool hustler "Fast Eddie" Felson. The Man Who Fell to Earth, directed by Nicolas Roeg, was released in 1976; it was subsequently re-made in 1987 as a TV film, and in 2022 as a TV series. The Queen’s Gambit is a 2020 Netflix mini-series starring Anya Taylor-Joy.

== Personal life ==
Tevis married Jamie Griggs in 1957, and they remained together for over twenty years before getting divorced. They had two children, a son, William Thomas, and daughter, Julia Ann.

Tevis was a frequent smoker, gambler and alcoholic, and his works often included these vices as central themes. Tevis took some of the money he earned from the movie rights to The Hustler and moved his family to Mexico, where he later claimed that he "stayed drunk for eight months." When Tevis was drinking, he couldn't write. According to his son Will, "[Walter Tevis] is the hero of all his own books." Having a heart condition, Tevis was given phenobarbital at a young age. This is considered part of the inspiration for the character Beth Harmon in The Queen's Gambit, and according to Tevis, part of the reason for his later alcoholism. Tevis was able to overcome his alcohol habit in the 1970s with help from Alcoholics Anonymous.

Tevis spent his last years in New York City as a full-time writer, where he died of lung cancer in 1984. He was buried in Richmond, Kentucky.

In 2003, Jamie Griggs Tevis published her autobiography, My Life with the Hustler. She died on August 4, 2006.

In 1983, Tevis married Eleanora Walker, later the trustee of the Walter Tevis Copyright Trust. She died December 9, 2016, at Bellevue Hospital in New York City, in an apparent suicide. Walter Tevis's literary output is represented by the Susan Schulman Literary Agency.

== Bibliography ==
=== Novels ===
- The Hustler. Harper & Row. 1959.
- The Man Who Fell to Earth. Gold Medal Books. 1963. Reprint: Del Rey Impact, 1999.
- Mockingbird. 1980. Reprint: Del Rey Impact, 1999.
- The Steps of the Sun. 1983.
- The Queen's Gambit. 1983.
- The Color of Money. 1984.

=== Short fiction ===
Collections

- Far from Home, Doubleday, 1981
- The King Is Dead: Stories, Vintage, 2023

List of stories

- "The Best in the Country", Esquire, November 1954.
- "The Big Hustle", Collier's, August 5, 1955.
- "Misleading Lady", The American Magazine, October 1955.
- "Mother of the Artist", Everywoman's, 1955.
- "The Man from Chicago", Bluebook, January 1956.
- "The Stubbornest Man", Saturday Evening Post, January 19, 1957.
- "The Hustler", (original title: "The Actors") Playboy, January 1957.
- "Operation Gold Brick" (original title: "The Goldbrick"), If, June 1957.
- "The Ifth of Oofth", Galaxy, April 1957
- "The Big Bounce", Galaxy, February 1958.
- "Sucker's Game", Redbook, August 1958.
- "First Love", Redbook, August 1958.
- "Far From Home", The Magazine of Fantasy & Science Fiction, December 1958.
- "Alien Love" (original title: "The Man from Budapest") Cosmopolitan, April 1959. Adapted as a teleplay for NBC's The Loretta Young Show, season 7, episode 12, aired December 13, 1959.
- "A Short Ride in the Dark", Toronto Star Weekly Magazine, April 4, 1959.
- "Gentle Is the Gunman" Saturday Evening Post, August 13, 1960.
- "The Other End of the Line", The Magazine of Fantasy & Science Fiction, November 1961.
- "The Machine That Hustled Pool", Nugget, February 1961.
- "The Scholar's Disciple", College English, October 1969.
- "The King Is Dead", Playboy, September 1973.
- "Rent Control", Omni, October 1979.
- "The Apotheosis of Myra", Playboy, July 1980.
- "Echo" The Magazine of Fantasy & Science Fiction, October 1980.
- "Out of Luck", Omni, November 1980.
- "Sitting in Limbo", Far from Home, 1981.
- "Daddy", Far from Home, 1981.
- "A Visit from Mother", Far from Home, 1981.
