= John Moody (opera director) =

British opera and theatre producer, actor and translator

John Percivale Moody (1906 - 1993) was a British opera and theatre producer, actor and translator. He was the director of the Welsh National Opera for several years.

== Early career/biography ==
Moody was born in Claygate, Surrey on 6 April 1906 to Percivale Sadlier Moody and Marion Louisa Ley and was educated at Bromsgrove School.

Later he worked at a publishing company for two years, then left to become a painter, training at the Royal Academy Schools and working in a studio used previously by Eric Ravilious and Edward Bawden. By 1930 he had co-founded the New Kingston Group and was exhibiting around the country. In 1931 he was teaching Architecture and Perspective at the Wimbledon School of Art.

In 1930 he won a scholarship to the Webber Douglas School of Singing, later the Webber Douglas Academy of Dramatic Art. It was there he met his future wife, the opera singer Helen Pomfret (Nella) Burra. He made his debut as an actor at the Lyric, Hammersmith in Derby Day in 1931. An accomplished actor, he performed at The Old Vic for two seasons in 1934 and 1937.

Moody and Nella Burra (1909–1999) married in 1937, shortly after the death of Nell's twin brother Peter Burra, who was a writer and critic and a close friend of Peter Pears. They lived in Brunswick Square, London after their marriage. The couple had a son William in 1942; he died in a boating accident in 1958.

Moody served with the Auxiliary Fire Service during World War 2. Living in London during the Blitz, he was injured and moved to Warwickshire to convalesce.

== Later career ==
In 1940 Moody became Principal of the Old Vic Theatre School. He stayed until 1942, when he was appointed as producer to the Old Vic Company in Liverpool. His career in opera started when the Carl Rosa Opera Company approached him to produce La Tosca in 1945. Between 1945 and 1949 he was a producer at Sadler's Wells. Moody was the lighting designer for the Sadler's Wells Opera Ballet production of 'Khadra' of 1946 choreographed by Celia Franca. In 1949 he became drama director of the Arts Council of Great Britain. Temporarily released by the Arts Council in 1952, he directed a production of Nabucco for the Welsh National Opera in Cardiff, a major landmark which received outstanding reviews. The production was staged at Sadlers Wells in 1957. Later, between 1954 and 1959, he was the director of Bristol Old Vic.

On receiving an invitation from Bill Smith in 1959 to become Director of Productions at the Welsh National Opera, he accepted and retained the post for nine years. Under his guardianship many singers were given opportunities at the start of their careers and he was largely responsible for helping develop the WNO into a professional company. He resigned from the role in 1969 to concentrate on his painting but remained as Counsellor to the Board. He was awarded an OBE in 1961.

Moody died in Bristol on 14 April 1993.

== Translations ==
With his wife Nell he was responsible for translating libretti into English for Rimsky-Korsakov's May Night, Borodin's Prince Igor and Bizet's The Pearl Fishers.
