= The Queen's Gambit (novel) =

1983 novel by Walter Tevis

- First edition, featuring cover art by Will Barnet
- Author: Walter Tevis
- Language: English
- Publisher: Random House
- Publication date: 1983
- Publication place: United States
- Pages: 243
- ISBN: 1-4000-3060-9

The Queen's Gambit is a 1983 American novel by Walter Tevis, exploring the life of fictional female chess prodigy Beth Harmon. A bildungsroman, or coming-of-age story, it covers themes of adoption, feminism, chess, drug addiction and alcoholism. The book was adapted for the 2020 Netflix miniseries, The Queen's Gambit.

== Epigraph ==
The novel's epigraph is "The Long-Legged Fly" by W. B. Yeats. This poem highlights one of the novel's main concerns: the inner workings of genius in a woman. Tevis discussed this concern in a 1983 interview, the year before his death.

== Development ==
In a New York Times interview published at the time of his book's release in 1983, Tevis said the story is "a tribute to brainy women." There has been speculation as to the inspiration for the Beth Harmon character, but Tevis emphatically denied that she was based on anyone in the chess community, male or female.

In 2007, actor Heath Ledger was working on what would have been his feature directing debut, an adaptation of The Queen's Gambit, with British writer/producer Allan Scott. The leading role of a young female chess prodigy had been offered to Oscar nominee Elliot Page. Ledger, himself a highly rated chess player, was due to play a supporting role as well, until his untimely death.

Bruce Pandolfini, a US chess master, consulted on the chess positions prior to the book's publication, and was the one who suggested the book's final title after the chess opening called "Queen's Gambit". Thirty-eight years later, he also returned to consult on the 2020 Netflix adaptation.

== Plot ==
At the age of 8, Beth Harmon is orphaned when her mother dies in a car accident. She is sent to Methuen, an orphanage where the children are fed tranquilizers to keep them compliant.

While there Beth observes the janitor, Mr. Shaibel, playing chess by himself. While he is initially reluctant to teach a girl, Beth eventually persuades him to play with her. Within a few months Mr. Shaibel confesses he has taught her all he knows and introduces her to a local high school teacher who runs the chess club.

Shortly after Beth beats a group of high school students at chess, she learns that the state is banning the use of tranquilizers on children. During an attempt to hoard the remaining tranquilizers for herself she accidentally overdoses. As part of her punishment for being caught she is forbidden from playing chess and interacting with Mr. Shaibel. She is befriended by Jolene, an athletic 13-year-old black girl, who sexually assaults her in the girls’ bedroom one night.

Five years later at the age of 13, Beth is adopted by the Wheatleys. Mr. Wheatley abandons his wife shortly after Beth is adopted. Beth immediately tries to play chess again. After stealing a chess magazine she learns that a local high school is holding a chess tournament and secretly writes to Mr. Shaibel asking him to lend her the funds to enter the tournament. Despite being an unranked player and not having had access to a chess set in five years, Beth not only wins the tournament but defeats the Kentucky state champion Harry Beltik. Unable to cash her winnings herself, she reveals that she has won to Mrs. Wheatley. In desperate financial straits Mrs. Wheatley begins arranging for Beth to play more tournaments, focusing on the ones with the highest prizes and collecting a 10% agent's fee.

Beth attracts attention as a prodigy but meets the U.S. champion, Benny Watts, a former prodigy himself, and is beaten by him resulting in her being crowned U.S. co-champion. For several years she feels that despite her talent she is floundering as she is aging. She also continues to use both drugs and alcohol recreationally, stealing tranquilizers from Mrs. Wheatley and discovering that bingeing alcohol relaxes her anxiety. At the age of 18 she attends a competition in Mexico where she meets and is defeated by the Russian Vasily Borgov. Returning to her hotel room she discovers that Mrs. Wheatley has died, leaving her orphaned once again.

Back in the U.S., Beth reunites with Harry Beltik who, while he admires her for being an intuitive player, insists she study chess more seriously. They begin both a professional and personal relationship but after he teaches her all he knows he abruptly leaves to focus on his studies.

Beth attends the U.S. championships and manages to defeat Benny Watts. Finally the solo U.S. champion, she now gets invitations to compete internationally. Benny offers to coach her, so she moves to New York to study under him, and they also start a sexual relationship. Beth quickly outstrips Benny and goes to Paris confident she is capable of beating Borgov. But although she plays her best and makes no obvious errors, Borgov defeats her. Beth returns to Kentucky where she begins binge drinking.

After attending a tournament to defend her Kentucky state champion title and losing badly in the first game, Beth realizes she is an alcoholic. She reaches out to her old friend from Methuen, Jolene, now a phys ed teacher who is getting a master's in political science. Jolene helps Beth get sober, and Beth triumphs at her next tournament.

Beth prepares to go to the Moscow international tournament, desperate for revenge against Borgov. Benny offers to go as her second, i.e. as a player who will strategize with Beth and help her prepare. While there is not much money available through the U.S. Chess Federation, a Christian organization offers to pay for everything as long as Beth is prepared to promote anti-communist propaganda. Declining, Beth ends up returning their money and is left without Benny. She continues to Moscow alone.

In Moscow, Beth successfully defeats her opponents though she fears her final game against Borgov. She also comes to realize the Soviets help each other strategize for games while she is mostly alone. Her final game with Borgov is adjourned. That evening, she finds it difficult to analyze the game but is saved by Benny, who calls her from New York and offers her his analysis. Once the game resumes, Borgov offers Beth a draw. She declines, going on to win the game. Beth makes plans to beat Borgov in the next two years to become world champion. At the embassy party celebrating her win, she feels uncomfortable and leaves early, going to play chess in the park against a group of local men who play for love of the game.

== Literary significance and reception ==
The novel is a thriller, a sports or game novel, and a bildungsroman.

The Queen's Gambit is sheer entertainment. It is a book I reread every few years—for the pure pleasure and skill of it.

— Michael Ondaatje (cover of Vintage paperback edition, 2003)

It is also highly praised for the technical accuracy of its depictions of chess:

New Yorker's reviewer was especially enthused with the novelist's recreation of the obsessive world of chess, noting that Tevis "does succeed in conveying the cerebral suspense with which would-be World Champions live." Harold C. Schonberg, writing in the New York Times Book Review, confirmed that Tevis "reveals a great deal about the world of American Chess, with a final glance at how the Russians operate, and it is an exceptionally accurate picture that he draws." Schonberg added: "Beth Harmon may not be prepossessing, but she has the dedication of a Biblical saint, a freak memory and an ability to synthesize and create and blow her little world apart with a kind of startling originality that nobody else can match. That is what chess on its highest level is all about." (From Contemporary Authors Online, 2007, Gale Reference)

Tevis based the chess scenes on his own experience as a "class C" player and on his long study of the game. He elaborates on this in the Author's Note for the novel:

The superb chess of Grandmasters Robert Fischer, Boris Spassky and Anatoly Karpov has been a source of delight to players like myself for years. Since The Queen's Gambit is a work of fiction, however, it seemed prudent to omit them from the cast of characters, if only to prevent contradiction of the record. I would like to express my thanks to Joe Ancrile, Fairfield Hoban and Stuart Morden, all excellent players, who helped me with books, magazines, and tournament rules. And I was fortunate to have the warm-hearted and diligent help of National Master Bruce Pandolfini in proofreading the text and in helping me rid it of errors concerning the game he plays so enviably well.

Some criticisms from Edward Winter:

The author ... tends to show insufficient ingenuity in his artificially stylized accounts of chess tournaments (e.g. lack of draws and, in the interests of suspense, having Beth meet all her strongest opponents in the final round).

== Screen adaptation ==
Prior to the 2020 Netflix miniseries, there were several unsuccessful attempts to adapt the book. In 1983, The New York Times journalist Jesse Kornbluth acquired the screenplay rights but the project was called off when Tevis died in 1984. In 1992, Scottish screenwriter Allan Scott purchased the rights from Tevis' widow, and wrote a script for an art house film. At different points directors Michael Apted and Bernardo Bertolucci were attached, but financing fell through. In 2007, Scott was working with Heath Ledger on what would have been Ledger's directorial debut, where Ledger wanted actor Elliot Page to star as Beth Harmon. Ledger died in January 2008. Scott co-created and co-executive produced the 2020 Netflix series.

In March 2019, Netflix ordered a limited seven-episode series based on the novel, also titled The Queen's Gambit. Anya Taylor-Joy plays the lead role of the series, while Scott Frank serves as writer, director, and executive producer. It was released on October 23, 2020, to widespread attention and critical acclaim.

== Stage adaptation ==
On March 8, 2021, it was announced that the stage rights to the novel had been acquired by the entertainment company Level Forward.

On November 15, 2023, it was announced that singer-songwriter Mitski would be working on the music and lyrics for the Broadway adaptation of the show, working alongside playwright Eboni Booth and director Whitney White.

== Publication history ==
- 1983, US, Random House
- 2003, US, Vintage
