= Paul Mayersberg =

English writer and director (born 1941)

- Born: 18 June 1941 (age 84); Hitchin, England
- Occupation: Writer

Paul Mayersberg (born 18 June 1941) is an English writer and director and was the film critic for Movie magazine in the early 1960s and author of 1968 film book Hollywood, The Haunted House. He wrote several films for Nicholas Roeg before turning director with Captive.

== Awards ==
Mayersberg received a nomination for Best Motion Picture in 2001 at the Edgar Awards for Croupier.

== Filmography ==
Year	Title	Role	Notes
2011	The Master of Farnow	(screenplay)	
1999	The Intruder	(additional writing)	
1998	Croupier	(writer)	
1990	The Last Samurai	(writer)	
1989	Return from the River Kwai	(screenplay)	
1988	Nightfall	(screenplay)	
1987	The Man Who Fell to Earth	(TV theatrical photoplay)	
1986	Captive	(writer)	
1983	Eureka	(writer)	
1983	Merry Christmas, Mr. Lawrence	(screenplay)	
1977	The Disappearance	(writer)	
1976	The Man Who Fell to Earth	(writer)	
1972	Siddhartha	(associate writer)	
1964	The Tomb of Ligeia	(Uncredited)	

== Director ==
Year	Title	Role	Notes
1990	The Last Samurai		
1988	Nightfall		
1986	Captive		
