= Lennox Berkeley =

English composer (1903–1989)

Sir Lennox Berkeley CBE
- Berkeley in 1938
- Born: 12 May 1903; Oxford, England
- Died: 26 December 1989 (aged 86); London, England
- Occupations: Composer; Academic teacher; Festival director

Sir Lennox Randal Francis Berkeley (12 May 1903 – 26 December 1989) was an English composer.

== Biography ==
Berkeley was born on 12 May 1903 in Oxford, England, the younger child and only son of Aline Carla (1863–1935), daughter of Sir James Charles Harris, former British consul in Monaco, and Royal Navy Captain Hastings George FitzHardinge Berkeley (1855–1934), the illegitimate and eldest son of George Lennox Rawdon Berkeley, the 7th Earl of Berkeley (1827–1888). His paternal uncle, Sir Ernest Berkeley, was British Commissioner and Consul-General for Uganda between 1895 and 1899.

He attended the Dragon School in Oxford, going on to Gresham's School, in Holt, Norfolk and St George's School in Harpenden, Hertfordshire. He studied French at Merton College, Oxford, graduating with a fourth class degree in 1926. While at university he coxed the college rowing eight. He became an honorary fellow of Merton College in 1974.

In 1927, he went to Paris to study music with Nadia Boulanger, as her first English student. There, Berkeley became acquainted with Francis Poulenc, Igor Stravinsky, Darius Milhaud, Arthur Honegger and Albert Roussel. Berkeley also studied with Maurice Ravel, often cited as a key influence in Berkeley's technical development as a composer.

In 1936, he met Benjamin Britten, also a former pupil of Gresham's School, at the ISCM Festival in Barcelona. Berkeley fell in love with Britten, who appears to have been wary of entering a relationship, writing in his diary, "we have come to an agreement on that subject." Nevertheless, the two composers shared a house for a year, living in the Old Mill at Snape, Suffolk, which Britten had acquired in July 1937. They subsequently enjoyed a long friendship and artistic association, collaborating on a number of works; these included the suite of Catalan dances titled Mont Juic, and Variations on an Elizabethan Theme (the latter also with four other composers).

He worked for the BBC during the Second World War, where he met his future wife, Elizabeth Freda Bernstein (1923–2016) whom he married on 14 December 1946. They had three sons: their eldest son Michael Berkeley, Baron Berkeley of Knighton, is also a composer, and their youngest son is the photographer Nick Berkeley.

He wrote several piano works for the pianist Colin Horsley, who commissioned the Horn Trio and some piano pieces, and gave the first performances and/or made the premier recordings of a number of his works, including his third Piano Concerto (1958).

He was Professor of Composition in the Royal Academy of Music from 1946 to 1968. His students included Richard Rodney Bennett, David Bedford, Adam Pounds, Richard Stoker, Clive Strutt, John Tavener and Brian Ferneyhough. Ferneyhough felt that he learned nothing from Berkeley because of the gap between their musical conceptions, remembering him as "a notably urbane and well-meaning presence" whose "Nadia Boulenger [sic] influenced gallic aesthetics were completely unable to deal with my compositional needs."

1954 saw the premiere of his first opera, Nelson, at Sadler's Wells. He was knighted in 1974 and from 1977 to 1983 was President of the Cheltenham Festival.

He resided at 8 Warwick Avenue, London, from 1947 until his death in 1989. On 20 March 1990 a memorial service was held for him at Westminster Cathedral, London.

== Honours ==
- 1983 Member of the Royal Academy of Science, Letters and Fine Arts of Belgium.

== Musical style ==
Berkeley's earlier music is broadly tonal, influenced by the neoclassical music of Stravinsky. Berkeley's contact and friendship with composers such as Ravel and Poulenc and his studies in Paris with Boulanger lend his music a 'French' quality, demonstrated by its "emphasis on melody, the lucid textures and a conciseness of expression". He maintained a negative view of atonal music at least up until 1948, when he wrote:

I have never been able to derive much satisfaction from atonal music. The absence of key makes modulation an impossibility, and this, to my mind, causes monotony [...] I am not, of course, in favour of rigidly adhering to the old key-system, but some sort of tonal centre seems to me a necessity.

However, from the mid-1950s, Berkeley apparently felt a need to revise his style of composition, later telling the Canadian composer, R. Murray Schafer that "it's natural for a composer to feel a need to enlarge his idiom." He started including tone rows and aspects of serial technique in his compositions around the time of the Concertino, Op. 49 (1955) and the opera Ruth (1955–56). His shift in opinion was demonstrated in an interview with The Times in 1959:

I'm not opposed to serial music; I've benefited from studying it, and I have sometimes found myself writing serial themes – although I don't elaborate on them according to strict serial principles, because I'm quite definitely a tonal composer. And there are some exceptions to the gospel of intellectualisation – I enjoyed listening to the record of Boulez's Le Marteau sans maître very much, because there the timbres of the music were attractive in themselves.

== Works ==
=== Opera ===
- Nelson, (1951)
- A Dinner Engagement, Op. 45 (1954)
- Ruth, Op. 50 (1955–6)
- Castaway, Op. 68 (1967)
- Faldon Park, (1979–85). Incomplete.

=== Orchestral ===
- Mont Juic, suite of Catalan dances, Op. 9 (written jointly with Benjamin Britten)
- Serenade, for string orchestra (1938–9)
- Symphony No. 1 (1936–40)
- Divertimento (1943)
- Piano Concerto in B-flat major, Op. 29 (1947–8)
- Concerto for Two Pianos and Orchestra, Op. 30 (1948)
- Symphony No. 2 (1958, revised 1976)
- Symphony No. 3, in one movement (1968–9)
- Sinfonia Concertante, for oboe and chamber orchestra (1972–3)
- Voices of the Night, Op. 86 (1973)
- Guitar Concerto, Op. 88
- Symphony No. 4 (1977–78)

=== Choral ===
- A Festival Anthem, Op. 21, No. 2 (1945)
- Crux fidelis, Op. 43, No. 1 (1955)
- I sing of a maiden (1966)
- Look up, sweet babe, Op. 43, No. 2 (1955)
- Missa Brevis, Op. 57 (1960)
- Mass for five voices, Op. 64 (1964)
- Magnificat for chorus and orchestra, Op. 71 (1968)
- Three Latin Motets, Op. 83, No. 1 (1972)
- Three Songs for Four Male Voices, Op. 67, No. 1 (1965)
- The Lord is my shepherd, Op. 91, No. 1 (1975)
- Magnificat and Nunc dimittis ("Chichester service"), Op. 99 (1980)

=== Solo vocal ===
- Five Housman Songs, Op. 14, No. 3
- Four Poems of St Teresa of Ávila, Op. 27, for contralto and string orchestra (1947)
- Three Greek Songs, Op. 38 (1953)
- Five Poems by W. H. Auden, Op. 53

=== Chamber ===
- String Quartet No. 1, Op. 6 (1935)
- String Quartet No. 2, Op. 15 (1941)
- String Trio, Op. 19 (1943)
- Sonata in D minor for viola and piano, Op. 22 (1945)
- Introduction and Allegro, for solo violin (1949) (edited by Ivry Gitlis)
- Trio for horn, violin and piano, Op. 44 (1952)
- Sextet for clarinet, horn and string quartet, Op. 47 (1954)
- String Quartet No. 3, Op. 76 (1970)
- Introduction and Allegro, for double bass and piano (1972) (for Rodney Slatford)
- Duo for cello and piano
- Sonata Op. 97 for flute and piano
- Sonatina Op. 13 for recorder and piano
- Three Pieces for Solo Viola, WoO (Dedicated to Stephan Deák, discovered 2004.)

=== Piano ===
- Three Pieces, Op. 2 (1935)
- Piano Sonata in A major, Op. 20 (1941–5)
- Six Preludes, Op. 23 (1945)
- Three Mazurkas, Op. 31 No. 1 (1939–49)

=== Guitar ===
- Quatre pièces pour la guitare (1928)
- Sonatina, Op. 52, No. 1 (1957)
- Theme and Variations, Op. 77 (1970)

=== Clarinet ===
- Three Pieces for Clarinet, (1939)

=== Flute ===
- Sonatina for Flute or Treble Recorder and Piano (1940)

=== Violin ===
- Sonatina for Violin and Piano in A, Op. 17 (1942)
- Theme and Variations (1950)

=== Film and radio ===
Film Scores:

- Sword of the Spirit, December 1942
- Out of Chaos, January 1944, London Symphony orchestra
- Hotel Reserve, June 1944, BBC Northern orchestra/Muir Mathieson
- The First Gentleman, April 1948, Royal Philharmonic orchestra/Thomas Beecham, April 1948
- Youth in Britain, April 1958

Radio Scores:

- Westminster Abbey, 1941, Section of Northern BBC orchestra, London, BBC, 7 September 1941
- Yesterday and Today, 1943, Wireless Singers/Father
- J. B. Mc Elligott, Evesham, BBC, 19 April 1942
- A Glutton for life, 1946, ad hoc orchestra/Lennox Berkeley, London BBC, 21 November 1946
- The wall of Troy, 1946, ad hoc orchestra/Lennox Berkeley, London BBC, 21 November 1946
- The Seraphina, 1956, Sinfonia of London/Lennox Berkeley, London BBC, 4 October 1956
- Look back to Lyttletoun, 1957, English opera group orchestra, Ambrosian singers/ Norman del Mar, London, BBC, 8 July 1957

== See also ==
- Berkeley Ensemble
