= The Man Who Fell to Earth (TV series) =

2022 science fiction drama television series

- Genre: Drama; Science fiction
- Created by: Jenny Lumet; Alex Kurtzman
- Based on: The Man Who Fell to Earth by Walter Tevis
- Starring: Chiwetel Ejiofor; Naomie Harris; Annelle Olaleye; Clarke Peters; Bill Nighy; Jimmi Simpson; Kate Mulgrew; Sonya Cassidy; Joana Ribeiro; Rob Delaney
- Country of origin: United States
- Original language: English
- No. of seasons: 1
- No. of episodes: 10

Production
- Executive producers: Rola Bauer; Carl Beverly; Françoise Guyonnet; John Hlavin; Heather Kadin; Alex Kurtzman; Jenny Lumet; Sarah Timberman; Chiwetel Ejiofor
- Production companies: Secret Hideout; Timberman/Beverly Productions; StudioCanal; CBS Studios

Original release
- Network: Showtime
- Release: April 24 – July 3, 2022

The Man Who Fell to Earth is an American science fiction drama television limited series created by Jenny Lumet and Alex Kurtzman based on the 1963 novel of the same name by Walter Tevis. It is a sequel to the 1976 film starring David Bowie. The series stars Chiwetel Ejiofor as an alien who arrives on planet Earth and Bill Nighy, playing the role originally played by Bowie in the 1976 film. It debuted on Showtime on April 24, 2022. A portion of the series was shown at SXSW on March 12, 2022. The series was canceled after one season.

== Premise ==
The future of the planet is in the hands of an alien who arrives on Earth at a pivotal moment in history.

== Cast ==
=== Main ===
- Chiwetel Ejiofor as Faraday
- Naomie Harris as Justin Falls
- Annelle Olaleye as Molly Falls
- Clarke Peters as Josiah Falls
- Bill Nighy as Thomas Jerome Newton
- Jimmi Simpson as Spencer Clay
- Kate Mulgrew as Drew Finch
- Sonya Cassidy as Edie Flood
- Joana Ribeiro as Lisa Dominguez
- Rob Delaney as Hatch Flood

=== Recurring ===
- Tanya Moodie as Portia
- Juliet Stevenson as Sister Mary Lou Prescott
- Art Malik as Henning Khan
- Josh Herdman as Terry Mannch
- Laurie Kynaston as Clive Flood

=== Guest ===
- Martha Plimpton as Officer K. Faraday
- Zoë Wanamaker as Watt
- Victoria Smurfit as Penny Morgan

== Episodes ==
Each episode is named after a David Bowie song.

No.	Title	Directed by	Written by	Original release date	U.S. viewers (millions)
1	"Hallo Spaceboy"	Alex Kurtzman	Jenny Lumet & Alex Kurtzman	April 24, 2022	0.125
2	"Unwashed and Somewhat Slightly Dazed"	Alex Kurtzman	Jenny Lumet & Alex Kurtzman	May 1, 2022	0.127
3	"New Angels of Promise"	Alex Kurtzman	Story by : Michael Alaimo; Teleplay by : Michael Alaimo and Jenny Lumet & Alex Kurtzman	May 8, 2022	0.145
4	"Under Pressure"	Alex Kurtzman	Story by : Jane Maggs; Teleplay by : Jane Maggs and Jenny Lumet & Alex Kurtzman	May 15, 2022	0.193
5	"Moonage Daydream"	Sarah Harding	Story by : John Lopez; Teleplay by : John Lopez and Jenny Lumet & Alex Kurtzman	May 29, 2022	0.162
6	"Changes"	Sarah Harding	Story by : Jane Maggs; Teleplay by : Jane Maggs and Jenny Lumet & Alex Kurtzman	June 5, 2022	0.164
7	"Cracked Actor"	Joss Agnew	Story by : Helen Shang; Teleplay by : Jenny Lumet & Alex Kurtzman	June 12, 2022	0.137
8	"The Pretty Things Are Going to Hell"	Joss Agnew	Story by : Bill Wolkoff; Teleplay by : John Hlavin and Jenny Lumet & Alex Kurtzman	June 19, 2022	0.121
9	"As the World Falls Down"	Olatunde Osunsanmi	Story by : Jane Maggs; Teleplay by : Jane Maggs and Jenny Lumet & Alex Kurtzman	June 26, 2022	0.171
10	"The Man Who Sold the World"	Olatunde Osunsanmi	John Hlavin and Jenny Lumet & Alex Kurtzman	July 3, 2022	0.149

== Production ==
A television adaptation of Walter Tevis's novel The Man Who Fell to Earth, moved from Hulu to CBS All Access in August 2019. It was created by Jenny Lumet and Alex Kurtzman. It had been in development at Hulu for over a year, and was moved as a result of the acquisition of 21st Century Fox by Disney, as disagreements over co-production could not be resolved.

In February 2021, Chiwetel Ejiofor was cast to star in the series, playing the role of the alien/Faraday. The next month, the series moved to Showtime, with Naomie Harris, Jimmi Simpson and Clarke Peters added to the cast. Rob Delaney, Sonya Cassidy, Joana Ribeiro, and Annelle Olayele would join in April. In August, Kate Mulgrew joined in a recurring role. In January 2022, Bill Nighy was cast to play Thomas Jerome Newton, the role David Bowie played in the film. In October 2022, it was reported that Showtime would not renew the series for a second season.

Major part of the filming was done in the University of Hertfordshire.

Filming began on May 3, 2021, in London.

== Release ==
The series was initially planned for a 2021 release on Paramount+. It premiered on April 24, 2022, on Showtime and on Paramount+ internationally.

== Reception ==
=== Critical response ===
The review aggregator website Rotten Tomatoes reported an 86% approval rating with an average rating of 6.7/10, based on 30 critic reviews. The website's critics consensus reads, "The Man Who Fell to Earth may not be out of this world, but a commanding Chiwetel Ejiofor gives this space oddity an earthy gravitas." Metacritic, which uses a weighted average, assigned a score of 68 out of 100 based on 16 critics, indicating "generally favorable reviews".

=== Ratings ===
Viewership and ratings per episode of The Man Who Fell to Earth
No.	Title	Air date	Rating (18–49)	Viewers (millions)
1	"Hallo Spaceboy"	April 24, 2022	0.02	0.125
2	"Unwashed and Somewhat Slightly Dazed"	May 1, 2022	0.02	0.127
3	"New Angels of Promise"	May 8, 2022	0.03	0.145
4	"Under Pressure"	May 15, 2022	0.03	0.193
5	"Moonage Daydream"	May 29, 2022	0.02	0.162
6	"Changes"	June 5, 2022	0.02	0.164
7	"Cracked Actor"	June 12, 2022	0.02	0.137
8	"The Pretty Things Are Going to Hell"	June 19, 2022	0.01	0.121
9	"As the World Falls Down"	June 26, 2022	0.02	0.171
10	"The Man Who Sold the World"	July 3, 2022	0.02	0.149

=== Awards and nominations ===
Award	Date of ceremony	Category	Nominee(s)	Result	Ref.
Saturn Awards	October 25, 2022	Best Science Fiction Television Series: Network/Cable	The Man Who Fell to Earth	Nominated	
Saturn Awards	October 25, 2022	Best Actor in a Network or Cable Television Series	Chiwetel Ejiofor	Nominated	
