= Michael Berkeley =

British composer and broadcaster on music (born 1948)

The Right Honourable The Lord Berkeley of Knighton CBE
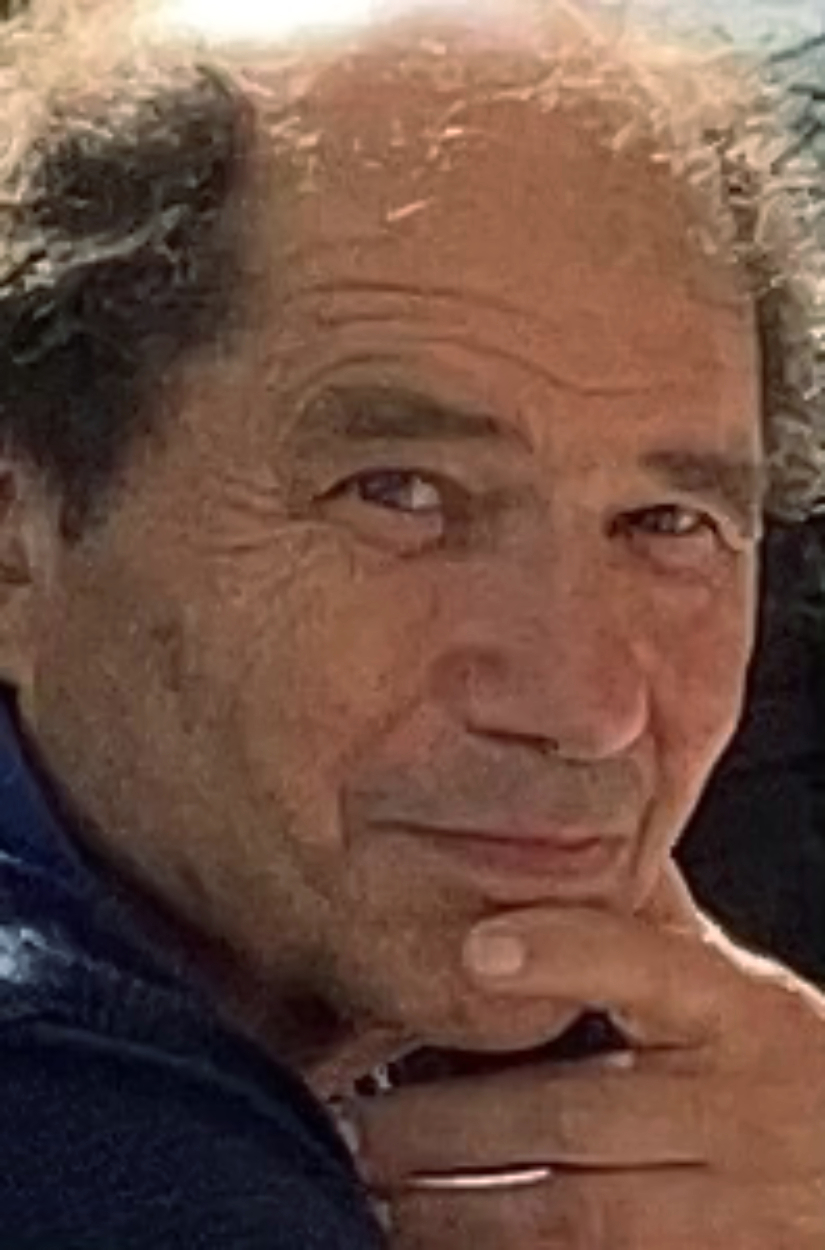

Member of the House of Lords
- Lord Temporal
- Life peerage 26 March 2013

Personal details
- Born: Michael Fitzhardinge Berkeley; 29 May 1948 (age 78)
- Party: None (crossbencher)
- Occupation: Composer and broadcaster
- Website: michaelberkeley.co.uk

Michael Fitzhardinge Berkeley, Baron Berkeley of Knighton (born 29 May 1948) is an English composer, broadcaster on music and non-party political member of the House of Lords, speaking as an advocate for the arts, contemporary music and music education.

== Early life ==
Berkeley is the eldest of the three sons of Elizabeth Freda (née Bernstein) (1923–2016) and the composer Sir Lennox Berkeley. He was educated at The Oratory School, in Woodcote, and Westminster Cathedral Choir School. He was a chorister at Westminster Cathedral, and he frequently sang in works composed or conducted by his godfather, Benjamin Britten. Berkeley studied composition, singing and piano at the Royal Academy of Music. He also played in a rock band, Seeds of Discord. In his twenties, when he went to study with Richard Rodney Bennett, he concentrated on composition.

== Works ==
Berkeley's compositions include Meditations for Strings (1975), String Trio (1976) and an oratorio Or Shall We Die? (libretto by Ian McEwan, 1982). His orchestral works include Flames (RLPO/Atherton 1981), Gregorian Variations (Philharmonia/Pittsburgh/Previn 1984), Secret Garden (LSO/Davis, Barbican 1997) and The Garden of Earthly Delights (NYO/Rostropovich, Proms 1998) plus concerti for clarinet, violin, oboe, 'cello and organ.

He has written three operas. Baa Baa Black Sheep (libretto by David Malouf) is based on the childhood of Rudyard Kipling and was recorded by the Opera North Chorus and English Northern Philharmonia in 1993. Jane Eyre (2000, libretto also by David Malouf), premiered at the Cheltenham Music Festival by Music Theatre Wales and subsequently toured around the UK. The Australian premiere took place in Canberra and the American in St. Louis where it was directed by Colin Graham. The original drafts for Jane Eyre, representing one year's worth of work and the only copy of them, were stolen from outside his London home in May 1999. The chamber opera For You, with Ian McEwan the librettist, was premiered by Music Theatre Wales in the Linbury Theatre, Royal Opera House, Covent Garden. A proposed opera of McEwan's novel Atonement with libretto by Craig Raine for Dortmund Opera was set for premiere in 2013, but was shelved.

Berkeley has written scores for films including Captive (with the Edge of U2, 1986), Goldeneye (1989) and Twenty-One (1991). He arranged the choral sequences for "Hello Earth", a song written by Kate Bush that appeared on her studio album Hounds of Love in 1985.

Berkeley has written a considerable amount of chamber music for artists including Julian Bream (Guitar Sonata, Edinburgh Festival, 1980), the Takacs Quartet (Torque and Velocity, 1997) and Nicholas Daniel with the Carducci Quartet (Into the Ravine). The harpsichordist Mahan Esfahani premiered Berkeley's Haiku 2: Insects, composed for Esfahani, at the Snape Maltings Concert Hall in April 2023.

Berkeley has written much choral music, including the specially commissioned Listen, listen, O my child for the enthronement of Justin Welby as Archbishop of Canterbury in 2013 and the Magna Carta Te Deum, for the 800th anniversary of Magna Carta in 2015 in Lincoln Cathedral. He wrote This Endernight for the 2016 King's College Festival of nine Lessons and Carols and Super Flumina Babylonis for the St. Cecilia Day Service in Westminster Cathedral in 2017.

In June 2024, Orchid Classics released Collaborations, a CD of Berkeley's music featuring artists he had worked closely with and written for. These included Mahan Esfahani, Clare Hammond, Madeleine Mitchell, Alice Coote, Julius Drake and the BBC Singers. The album includes a song for Ukraine, Zero Hour, with lyrics and vocals from Neil Tennant and guitar solos from David Gilmour.

== Broadcasting ==
Berkeley is also known as a television and radio broadcaster on music. Between 1974 and 1979 he worked for BBC Radio 3 as a staff continuity announcer. Also on radio, he contributed to Record Review (1972–77) and was a regular presenter of Mainly for Pleasure (1980–92) and In Tune (1992–93).

Since 1995, Berkeley has presented BBC Radio 3's Private Passions, in which celebrities are invited to choose and discuss several pieces of music. In December 1997, one of his guests was a 112-year-old Viennese percussionist called Manfred Sturmer, who told anecdotes about Brahms, Clara Schumann, Richard Strauss, Arnold Schoenberg and others so realistically that some listeners did not realise that the whole thing was a hoax perpetrated by Berkeley and John Sessions. On 30 December 2018, King Charles, when Prince of Wales, was the guest on Private Passions, in order to mark the passing of more than one thousand editions of the programme, and to celebrate the prince's 70th birthday. On 26 October 2025, the programme was broadcast from Chequers, where Berkeley was joined by Prime Minister Sir Keir Starmer. In the Voice of the Listener and Viewer Awards for Excellence, Private Passions was named 'Best Radio Music and Arts Programme' in 2018 and again in 2026.

== Prizes and posts ==
In 1977, Berkeley was awarded the Guinness Prize for Composition. In 1979, the Scottish Chamber Orchestra appointed him its associate composer. Berkeley was composer-in-association with the BBC National Orchestra of Wales from 2000 until 2009. He also acted as visiting professor in Composition at the Royal Welsh College of Music & Drama and was artistic director of the Cheltenham Music Festival from 1995 to 2004. In 2002 and 2003, he was international guest curator of chamber music programmes at the Sydney Festival, Australia's largest arts festival. He has served as a trustee of the Koestler Trust, which puts music and the arts into prisons.

Berkeley was appointed a Commander of the Order of the British Empire (CBE) in the 2012 Birthday Honours for services to music. He was awarded an honorary doctor of music degree by Aberdeen University in 2022.

Berkeley is a Fellow of the Royal Northern College of Music and an honorary Doctor of Music from the University of East Anglia and a Fellow of the Royal Academy of Music. He is President of the Presteigne Festival of Music and is also a Vice-President of the Joyful Company of Singers.

== Membership of the House of Lords ==
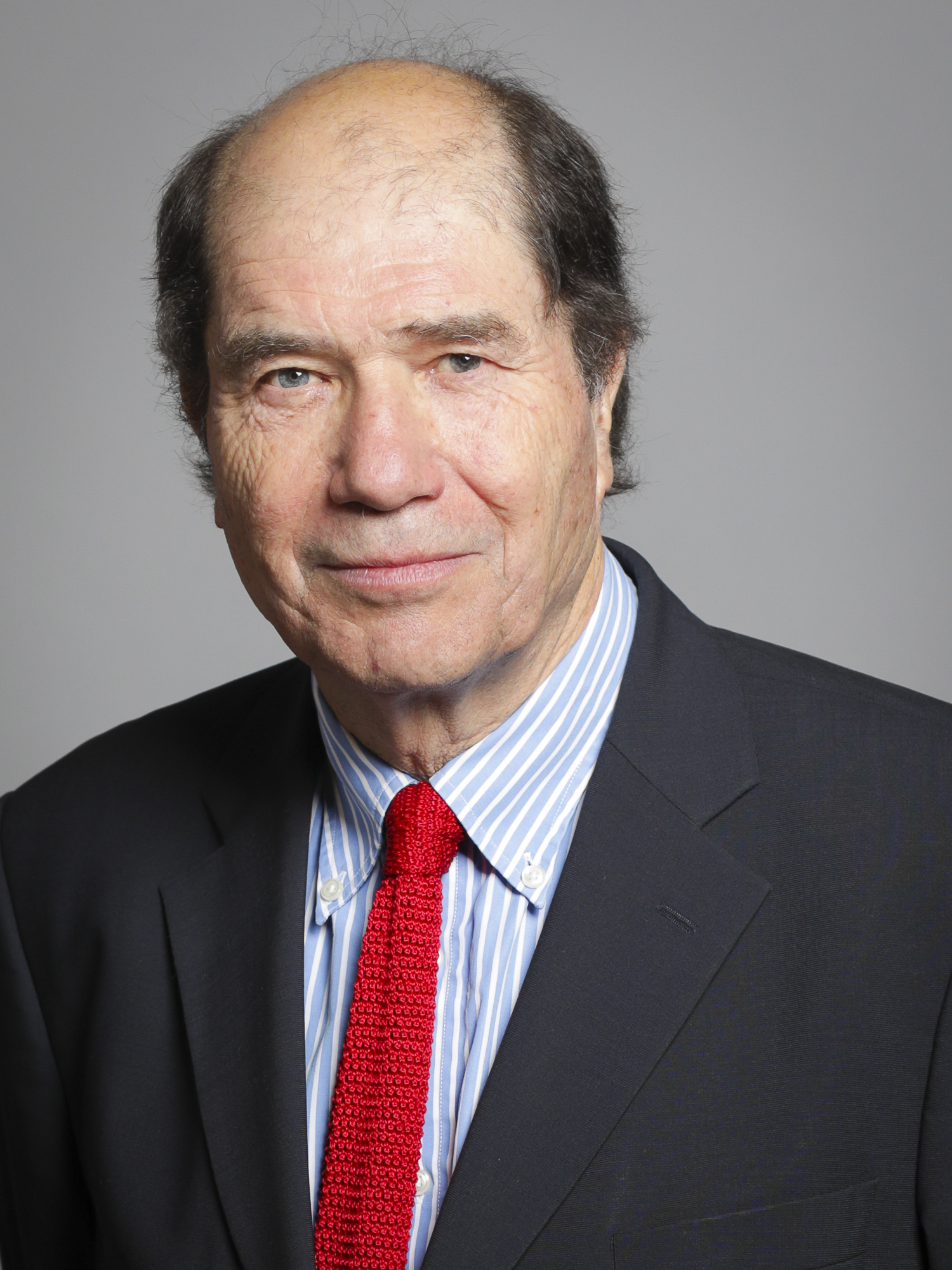
Official parliamentary portrait, 2019

In February 2013, it was announced that he would be made a life peer and enter the House of Lords as a crossbencher and on 26 March 2013 he was created Baron Berkeley of Knighton, of Knighton in the County of Powys.

In 2018, Lord Berkeley successfully instigated and steered through the House of Lords an Amendment to the Children Act 1989. This corrected an oversight in the law that meant that, while the Family Court could issue a Care Order for a child at risk of forced marriage or from a habitually drunk and violent father, it could not issue an Order for a child at risk of Female Genital Mutilation. The bill received unanimous backing in the House of Lords but, on reaching the House of Commons, where it was sponsored by Zac Goldsmith, it was twice objected to by Christopher Chope. This led to national outrage, and several cabinet ministers condemned Chope's actions. Subsequently, first the Home Secretary and then the Prime Minister told parliament that they would find Government time for the Bill, which finally received Royal Assent on 15 March 2019. Berkeley has campaigned for changes in legislation regarding Imprisonment for Public Protection and Joint Enterprise (Common purpose), and has consistently spoken in support of music and music education.

== Personal life ==
Berkeley has been married twice. His first marriage was to the literary agent Deborah Rogers. The marriage lasted from 1979 until her death in April 2014. The couple adopted a daughter, Jessica. Berkeley composed his Violin Concerto (in memoriam D.R.), premiered in July 2016 at The Proms, in tribute to Rogers. In June 2016, Berkeley married Elizabeth West, who had previously been married to Salman Rushdie, formerly a client of Deborah Rogers. Berkeley has a residence in London and a farm in Wales.

== See also ==
- Berkeley Ensemble

Orders of precedence in the United Kingdom
Preceded by The Lord Nash	Gentlemen; Baron Berkeley of Knighton	Followed by The Lord Livingston of Parkhead
