= Jorge L. Contreras =

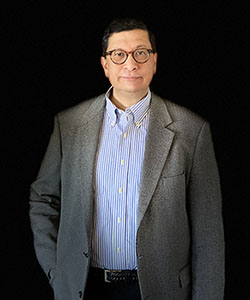
- Born: New York, NY
- Education: Rice University (BA, BSE); Harvard University (JD)
- Employer(s): American University; Washington University in St. Louis; University of Utah

Jorge L. Contreras is an American legal scholar who is an authority on intellectual property law, technical standardization and the law and policy of human genomics.

== Early life and education ==
Contreras was born in Flushing, Queens, New York, and spent his childhood in South Florida and Texas. He attended Rice University in Houston, Texas. At Rice, Contreras held the elected offices of Rice Program Council (RPC) treasurer and Student Association treasurer, and was a member of the Marching Owl Band (MOB). During the summer of 1987 he studied English literature at Gonville and Caius College, Cambridge. Contreras attended Harvard Law School from 1988 to 1991, where he earned his JD degree and served as an editor of the Harvard Journal of Law & Technology and worked for Professor Laurence Tribe.

== Professional titles ==
Contreras currently holds the rank of Presidential Scholar and Professor of Law at the University of Utah S.J. Quinney College of Law, with an adjunct appointment in the Department of Human Genetics at the University of Utah School of Medicine. He also serves as a Senior Policy Fellow at American University Washington College of Law. He has held prior academic appointments at American University Washington College of Law (2011–13) and Washington University School of Law (2010–11). For the past two years Contreras has taught a short course on international patent licensing and litigation at the East China University for Political Science and Law in Shanghai (ECUPL) and served as a TILT/TILEC fellow at Tilburg University in the Netherlands during 2018.

Prior to entering academia, Contreras was a partner at the international law firm Wilmer, Cutler, Pickering, Hale and Dorr LLP, where he practiced transactional intellectual property law in Boston, MA, Washington, DC and London, UK. He clerked for Chief Justice Thomas R. Phillips of the Texas Supreme Court during the 1991-92 court term.

== Scholarship and writing ==
Contreras's research focuses on patent and antitrust law, science policy, and technology standardization and innovation.

The Genomic Commons

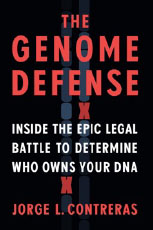
The Genome Defense

Contreras was among the first scholars to conceptualize the vast collection of publicly-available genomic data that emerged after the Human Genome Project within the theoretical framework of the knowledge commons [, a construct first developed by Elinor Ostrom and Charlotte Hess and later expanded by Brett Frischmann, Michael Madison and Kathleen Strandburg

Gene Patents

Contreras's book The Genome Defense, recounts the untold story of AMP v. Myriad, the ACLU's unlikely lawsuit that ended gene patenting in America. Based on over a hundred interviews and thousands of pages of court and agency documentation, the book explains this complex case and subject in a manner intended for the general reader.

On September 16, 2021, The New York Times included The Genome Defense in its list of "11 New Works of Nonfiction to Read This Season".

== Government and advisory roles ==
In June, 2020, Contreras testified before the U.S. Senate Committee on the Judiciary's Subcommittee on Intellectual Property regarding issues of patent quality. In addition, he has served as the U.S. government's expert on international intellectual property licensing in two major international transfer pricing cases, including Amazon.com v. Commissioner and Coca-Cola Co. v. Commissioner, the latter of which resulted in a $3 billion tax recovery by the government.

Contreras has served on numerous governmental advisory committees and councils, including the National Institutes of Health (NIH) Council of Councils, the National Advisory Council for Human Genome Research, and the Advisory Council of the National Center for the Advancement of Translational Sciences (NCATS). He served as a member of the National Science Foundation’s (NSF) delegation to the international Belmont Forum on earth data governance and currently serves on the Oversight Board of the University of Utah’s Veterans’ Administration Genealogy Project.

In addition to government service, he has advised the National Academies of Science, Engineering and Medicine (NASEM) in various capacities, served on different committees of the American National Standards Institute (ANSI) and the Association of American Law Schools (AALS), sits on the advisory board of the American Antitrust Institute, and has served for two decades in the leadership of the American Bar Association’s (ABA) Section of Science and Technology Law, including five years as co-chair of the National Conference of Lawyers and Scientists.

== Awards and recognition ==
Contreras has received awards and recognition for his scholarship, including the University of Utah's Distinguished Researcher Award (2020), the Joseph Rossman Memorial Award from the Patent and Trademark Office Society for the best yearly paper published in the Journal of the Patent and Trademark Office Society (2021–2022), the University of Utah S.J. Quinney College of Law Faculty Scholarship Award (2018–19), the Daniels Fund Leadership in Ethics Education Award (2018), the Institute of Electrical and Electronics Engineers (IEEE) Standards Education Award (2018), the University of Utah S.J. Quinney College of Law Early Career Teaching Award (2015–16) and the Elizabeth Payne Cubberly Faculty Scholarship Award at American University (2014).
