= The Man Who Fell to Earth =

1976 British film by Nicolas Roeg

- Original British theatrical release poster by Vic Fair
- Directed by: Nicolas Roeg
- Screenplay by: Paul Mayersberg
- Based on: The Man Who Fell to Earth by Walter Tevis
- Produced by: Michael Deeley; Barry Spikings
- Starring: David Bowie; Rip Torn; Candy Clark; Buck Henry
- Cinematography: Anthony B. Richmond
- Edited by: Graeme Clifford
- Music by: John Phillips; Stomu Yamashta
- Production company: British Lion Films
- Distributed by: British Lion Films
- Release date: 18 March 1976
- Running time: 138 minutes
- Country: United Kingdom
- Language: English
- Budget: $1.5 million
- Box office: $3 million

The Man Who Fell to Earth is a 1976 British science fantasy drama film directed by Nicolas Roeg and adapted by Paul Mayersberg. Based on Walter Tevis's 1963 novel, the film follows an extraterrestrial named Thomas Jerome Newton who crash-lands on Earth seeking a way to ship water to his planet, which is suffering from a severe drought, but finds himself at the mercy of human vices and corruption. It stars David Bowie, Candy Clark, Buck Henry, and Rip Torn. It was produced by Michael Deeley and Barry Spikings. The same novel was later adapted as a television film in 1987. A 2022 television series with the same name serves as a continuation of the film 45 years later, including featuring Newton as a character and showing archival footage from the film.

The Man Who Fell to Earth retains a cult following for its use of surreal imagery and Bowie's first starring film role as the alien Thomas Jerome Newton. It is considered an important work of science fiction cinema and one of the best films of Roeg's career.

== Plot ==
Thomas Jerome Newton is a humanoid alien who travels to Earth from a distant planet. Landing in New Mexico, he appears as an Englishman. Newton has arrived on Earth on a mission to take water back to his home planet, which is experiencing a catastrophic drought. Newton swiftly uses the advanced technology of his home planet to patent many inventions on Earth. He acquires tremendous wealth as the head of an Arizona technology-based conglomerate, World Enterprises Corporation, aided by leading patent attorney Oliver Farnsworth. Newton needs the money to construct a rocket to ship water back to his home planet.

While revisiting New Mexico, Newton meets Mary-Lou, a lonely young woman from Oklahoma who works an array of part-time jobs in a small town hotel to support herself. Mary-Lou introduces Newton to many customs of Earth, including churchgoing, alcohol, and sex. She and Newton move into a house together which he has built close to where he first landed in New Mexico.

Dr. Nathan Bryce, a former college professor who had sex with his female students, has landed a job as a fuel technician with World Enterprises and slowly becomes Newton's confidant. Bryce senses Newton's alienness and arranges a meeting with Newton at his home where he has hidden a special X-ray camera. When he takes a picture of Newton with the camera, it reveals Newton's alien physiology. Newton's appetite for alcohol and television (he is capable of watching multiple televisions at once) becomes crippling, and he and Mary-Lou fight. Realizing that Bryce has learnt his secret, Newton reveals his alien form to Mary-Lou. She is unable to accept his true form, and flees in panic and horror.

Newton completes the spaceship and attempts to take it on its maiden voyage amid intense press exposure. However, just before his scheduled take-off, he is seized and detained, apparently by the government and a rival company. His business partner Farnsworth is murdered. The government, which had been monitoring Newton via his driver, holds Newton captive in a locked luxury apartment, constructed deep within a hotel. Toward the end of Newton's years of captivity, he is visited again by Mary-Lou. She is much older, and her appearance has been ravaged by alcohol and time. They have mock-violent, playful sex that involves firing a gun with blanks, and afterwards occupy their time drinking and playing table tennis. Mary-Lou declares that she no longer loves him, and he replies that he does not love her either. His captors keep Newton sedated with alcohol (to which he has become addicted) and subject him to rigorous medical tests, cutting into his human disguise. One examination, involving X-rays, causes the contact lenses he wears as part of his human disguise to permanently affix themselves to his eyes. Eventually Newton discovers that his "prison", now derelict, is unlocked, and he leaves.

Unable to return home, a despondent and alcoholic Newton creates a recording with alien messages, which he hopes will be broadcast via radio to his home planet. Bryce, who has since married Mary-Lou, listens to a copy of the album and meets Newton at a restaurant. Newton is still rich and young-looking despite the passage of many years. However, he has also fallen into depression and continues to suffer from alcoholism. Seated on the restaurant's outdoor patio, Newton inquires about Mary-Lou, before collapsing in a drunken stupor on the chair.

== Cast ==
- David Bowie as Thomas Jerome Newton
- Rip Torn as Dr. Nathan Bryce
- Candy Clark as Mary-Lou
- Buck Henry as Oliver V. Farnsworth
- Bernie Casey as Mr. Peters
- Jackson D. Kane as Professor Canutti
- Rick Riccardo as Trevor
- Tony Mascia as Arthur
- Adrienne La Russa as Helen
- Albert Nelson as waiter
- Claudia Jennings as Mr. Peters' wife (uncredited)
- Jim Lovell as himself

== Production ==
=== Pre-production ===
The novel was published in 1963 and had been optioned several times for the screen (including as a pilot for a TV series) but no adaptation had resulted. Roeg was shown the novel by Douglas Cammell and originally developed it under a deal with Columbia.

Nicolas Roeg approached Michael Deeley of British Lion, with whom he had made Don't Look Now (1973). Deeley was interested although he insisted on producing, meaning Roeg's preferred original producer, Si Litvinoff, was unable to make the movie. Paramount Pictures had distributed Don't Look Now (1973), and agreed to pay $1.5 million for the US rights. Michael Deeley used this guarantee to raise finance to make the film.

Roeg originally considered casting author Michael Crichton and actor Peter O'Toole in the role of Newton before Bowie.

=== Filming ===
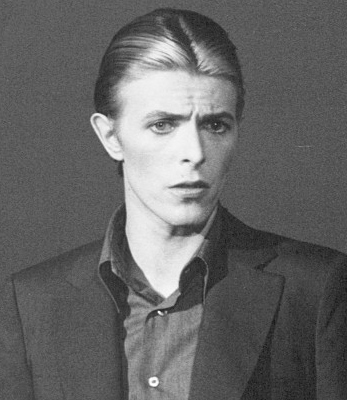
David Bowie, who stars as Newton, claimed to have little recollection of the film's production due to his cocaine use.

Filming began on 6 July 1975. The film was primarily shot in New Mexico, with filming locations in Albuquerque, White Sands, Artesia and Fenton Lake.

The film's production had been scheduled to last eleven weeks, and throughout that time, the film crew ran into a variety of obstacles: Bowie was sidelined for a few days after drinking bad milk; film cameras jammed up; and for one scene shot in the desert, the movie crew had to contend with a group of Hells Angels who were camping nearby.

Bowie, who was using cocaine during the movie's production, was in a fragile state of mind when filming was underway, going so far as to state in 1983 that "I'm so pleased I made that [film], but I didn't really know what was being made at all" and that "My one snapshot memory of that film is not having to act. Just being me was perfectly adequate for the role. I wasn't of this earth at that particular time." He said of his performance:

I just threw my real self into that movie as I was at that time. It was the first thing I'd ever done. I was virtually ignorant of the established procedure [of making movies], so I was going a lot on instinct, and my instinct was pretty dissipated. I just learned the lines for that day and did them the way I was feeling. It wasn't that far off. I actually was feeling as alienated as that character was. It was a pretty natural performance. ... a good exhibition of somebody literally falling apart in front of you. I was totally insecure with about 10 grams [of cocaine] a day in me. I was stoned out of my mind from beginning to end.

Candy Clark, Bowie's co-star, remembers things differently: "David vowed to Nic, 'No drug use'," says Clark and he was a man of his word, "clear as a bell, focused, friendly and professional and leading the team. You can see it clearly because of (DP) Tony Richmond's brilliant cinematography. Look at David: his skin is luminescent. He's gorgeous, angelic, heavenly. He was absolutely perfect as the man from another planet." She added that Roeg had brought "an entirely British crew with him to New Mexico and I remember David was very happy about that." Roeg also cast Bowie's bodyguard, Tony Mascia, as his character's onscreen chauffeur.

Bowie and Roeg had a good relationship on set. Bowie recalled in 1992 that "we got on rather well. I think I was fulfilling what he needed from me for that role. I wasn't disrupting ... I wasn't disrupted. In fact, I was very eager to please. And amazingly enough, I was able to carry out everything I was asked to do. I was quite willing to stay up as long as anybody."

Bowie brought a personal library with him; "I took 400 books down to that film shoot. I was dead scared of leaving them in New York because I was knocking around with some pretty dodgy people and I didn't want any of them nicking my books. Too many dealers, running in and out of my place."

=== Music ===
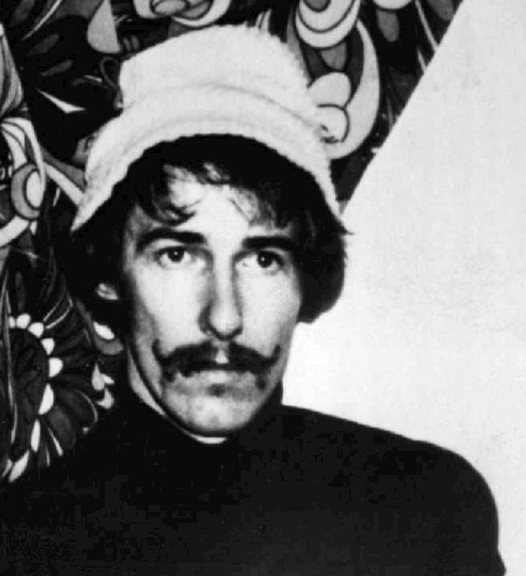
John Phillips coordinated the soundtrack after Bowie's compositions fell through.

Although Bowie was originally approached to provide the music, contractual wrangles during production caused him to withdraw from this aspect of the project. Nonetheless, Bowie would go on to use stills from the film for the covers of two of his albums, Station to Station (1976) and Low (1977). The music used in the film was coordinated by John Phillips, former leader of the pop group The Mamas & the Papas, with personal contributions from Phillips and Japanese percussionist-composer Stomu Yamash'ta as well as some stock music. Phillips called in former Rolling Stones guitarist Mick Taylor to assist with developing ideas for the soundtrack. The music was recorded at CTS Lansdowne Recording Studios in London, England.

Due to a creative and contractual dispute between Roeg and the studio, no official soundtrack was released for the film, even though the 1976 Pan Books paperback edition of the novel (released to tie in with the film) states on the back cover that the soundtrack is available on RCA Records. The soundtrack, derived from recently rediscovered masters, was eventually released on CD and LP in 2016 to coincide with the 40th anniversary of the film's premiere. The music by Yamash'ta had already appeared on his own albums, as noted below.

Music crew

- Musical Directors: John Phillips, Derek Wadsworth
- Piano/Keyboards: Pete Kelly, John Taylor
- Guitars: Mick Taylor, Ricky Hitchcock, Richard Morcombe, Jim Sullivan
- Pedal Steel Guitar: B. J. Cole
- Bass: Steve Cook
- Drums: Henry Spinetti
- Percussion: Frank Ricotti

Music as listed on end credits

Composed and recorded by Stomu Yamashta:

- "Poker Dice" (from Floating Music)
- "33⅓" (from Raindog)
- "Mandala" (from the Soundtrack from Man from the East)
- "Wind Words" (from Freedom is Frightening)
- "One Way" (from Floating Music)
- "Memory of Hiroshima" (from the Soundtrack from Man from the East)

Performed by John Phillips:

- "Boys from the South"
- "Rhumba Boogie"
- "Bluegrass Breakdown"
- "Hello Mary-Lou" (featuring Mick Taylor)

Other music:

- "Blueberry Hill" – Louis Armstrong
- "Enfantillages Pittoresques" composed by Erik Satie, performed by Frank Glazer
- "A Fool Such As I" – Hank Snow
- "Make the World Go Away" – Jim Reeves
- "Try to Remember" – The Kingston Trio
- "Blue Bayou" – Roy Orbison
- "Silent Night" – Robert Farnon
- "True Love" – Bing Crosby
- "Love Is Coming Back" – Genevieve Waite
- "Stardust" – Artie Shaw
- "Planets Suite, Op. 32: Mars, Bringer of War & Venus, Bringer of Peace"
  composed by Gustav Holst and performed by the Bournemouth Symphony Orchestra

For the scenes in which Newton's thoughts drift back to his alien home, Phillips and Roeg enlisted Desmond Briscoe to craft simple electronic atmospheres that were then combined with whale songs, to eerie effect.

== Release ==
According to Michael Deeley, when Barry Diller of Paramount saw the finished film he refused to pay for it, claiming it was different from the film the studio wanted. British Lion sued Paramount and received a small settlement. The film obtained a small release in the United States through Cinema V in exchange for $850,000 and due to foreign sales the film's budget was just recouped.

The British Board of Film Censors passed the film uncut for adult UK audiences with an X rating.

It was announced in the summer of 2016 that the film was in the process of being digitally remastered to 4K quality for its 40th anniversary (which was reported to have begun before Bowie's death). This remastered version premiered at BFI Southbank before being released in cinemas across the UK on 9 September of that year. The film's 2011 and 2016 re-releases grossed $100,072 domestically and $73,148 internationally.

== Reception ==
=== Critical response ===
Roger Ebert of the Chicago Sun-Times awarded the film 2 1/2 stars of four; while he complimented parts of the film and the directing, he was dismissive of the plot, writing in his review that the film is "so preposterous and posturing, so filled with gaps of logic and continuity, that if it weren't so solemn there'd be the temptation to laugh aloud." Gene Siskel of the Chicago Tribune gave the film three stars out of four and wrote that it "may leave you punch drunk, knocked out by its visuals to the point of missing what a simple story it is." Richard Eder of The New York Times praised the film, writing, "There are quite a few science-fiction movies scheduled to come out in the next year or so. We shall be lucky if even one or two are as absorbing and as beautiful as The Man Who Fell to Earth."

Writing for The New Yorker, Pauline Kael described the film as "The Little Prince for young adults, the hero, a stranger on earth, is purity made erotic" and describes Bowie as a "the most romantic figure in recent pictures, the modern version of the James Dean lost-boy myth."

Robert Hawkins, reviewing for Variety, praised Roeg's direction and felt the film was "stunning stuff throughout, and Bowie's choice as the ethereal visitor is inspired...Candy Clark, as his naive but loving mate, confirms the winning ways that won her an Oscar nomination in American Graffiti. Her intimate scenes with Bowie, especially the introductory ones, are among pic's highlights." Charles Champlin of the Los Angeles Times described Bowie as "perfect casting" but thought the film was "a muddle," and suspected it was because he reviewed a version trimmed by 20 minutes for its U.S. run: "That would do a lot to explain why the movie proceeds from the provocatively cryptic to the merely incomprehensible." In a retrospective review, Kim Newman of Empire gave the movie five stars out of five, describing the film as "consistently disorientating and beguilingly beautiful."

Review aggregator Rotten Tomatoes reports the film has a 78% approval rating based on 72 reviews with an average rating of 8.0/10. The critics' consensus states: "Filled with stunning imagery, The Man Who Fell to Earth is a calm, meditative film that profoundly explores our culture's values and desires." On Metacritic, the film has achieved a weighted average rating of 81 out of 100 from 9 critic reviews, citing "universal acclaim".

=== Legacy ===
Since its original 1976 release, The Man Who Fell to Earth has achieved cult status. This status has been echoed by critics, especially as it was a popular hit with midnight movie audiences years after it was released. Joshua Rothkopf of Time Out believed that the cult classic status, which he described as a "vaguely demeaning term", does the film a disservice. He labeled the film as "the most intellectually provocative genre film of the 1970s." When re-released in 2011, Ebert gave the film three stars, stating that readers should "consider this just a quiet protest vote against the way projects this ambitious are no longer possible in the mainstream movie industry." The movie has been applauded for its experimental approach and compared to more recent sci-fi films such as Under the Skin. Rolling Stone ranked it second on its 50 best sci-fi movies of the 1970s, Timeout ranked it 35th on its 100 best sci-fi movies, it is 61st on the Online Film Critics Society list of "greatest science fiction films of all time". Empire placed it 42nd on its list of 100 best British films. British Film Institute included it on its list of "50 late night classics", demonstrating its popularity as a midnight movie. Filmink noted the movie "features a scene where a woman talks to Rip Torn’s penis, and we see Candy Clark from every possible angle."

Bowie's role in the film led to his casting as Nikola Tesla in The Prestige (2006), with director Christopher Nolan stating "Tesla was this other-worldly, ahead-of-his-time figure, and at some point it occurred to me he was the original Man Who Fell to Earth. As someone who was the biggest Bowie fan in the world, once I made that connection, he seemed to be the only actor capable of playing the part." It also led to Bowie being cast by Jack Hofsiss in the play The Elephant Man. Hofsiss said: "The piece of work he did that was most helpful in making the decision was The Man Who Fell To Earth, in which I thought he was wonderful, and in which the character he played had an isolation similar to the Elephant Man's".

=== Accolades ===
| Date | Award | Category | Nominee | Result | Ref. |
|---|---|---|---|---|---|
| 25 June – 6 July 1976 | Berlin International Film Festival | Golden Bear | The Man Who Fell to Earth | Nominated | |
| 15 January 1977 | Saturn Awards | Best Science Fiction Film | The Man Who Fell to Earth | Nominated | |
| 15 January 1977 | Saturn Awards | Best Actor | David Bowie | Won | |
| 2–5 September 1977 | Hugo Awards | Best Dramatic Presentation | The Man Who Fell to Earth | Nominated | |

== In popular culture ==
- Iron Maiden's founder Steve Harris used the font in the film poster to come up with the band's iconic name design.
- In Philip K. Dick's science fiction novel VALIS, fictionalised versions of Dick and K. W. Jeter become obsessed with Valis, a film starring musician Eric Lampton. Dick based the novel's story on his and Jeter's real obsession with The Man Who Fell to Earth; Lampton is a fictionalised stand-in for Bowie.
- The music video to Guns N' Roses's 1987 "Welcome to the Jungle" was partially based on The Man Who Fell to Earth.
- The music video to Scott Weiland's 1998 song "Barbarella" uses themes from The Man Who Fell to Earth.
- Dr. Manhattan's apartment and Ozymandias' Antarctic retreat in the 2009 film Watchmen were mainly based on the set of The Man Who Fell to Earth.
- The 2009 song "ATX" by Alberta Cross is based on Bowie's character in The Man Who Fell to Earth.
- Michael Fassbender has said he used Bowie's performance as an inspiration for the android David in Ridley Scott's 2012 science fiction film Prometheus.
- In Bret Easton Ellis's 2010 novel Imperial Bedrooms, the main character mentions that he is involved with writing the script for a remake of The Man Who Fell to Earth.
- The musical Lazarus, which premiered off-Broadway in 2015, with music and lyrics by David Bowie and book by Enda Walsh, is based on the novel and the film. While the music video for the 2013 Bowie song "The Stars (Are Out Tonight)" references the film with a picture of alien Bowie, as he appears in the film, on a magazine.
- The title of Doctor Who series 11 episode 1 "The Woman Who Fell to Earth" (starring Jodie Whittaker as the Thirteenth Doctor) is a reference to the book and film.
- A character by the name Thomas Jerome Newton appears in the TV series Fringe, as does David Robert Jones, which is David Bowie's birth name.

== See also ==
- List of cult films
