= List of Primetime Emmy Awards received by Netflix =

Category	Wins	Nominations
Program	17	102
Performance	15	125
Directing	13	45
Writing	11	47
Casting	7	28
Cinematography	9	42
Costumes	4	17
Hairstyling	1	10
Hosting	0	3
Individual Achievement in Animation	1
Interactive Media	2	6
Main Title Design	1	10
Makeup	0	7
Motion Design	3
Music	7	50
Picture Editing	10	34
Production Design	4	24
Sound	4	48
Special Effects	0	10
Stunt Coordination	3	10
Technical Direction	0	1
- Totals
Wins	260
Nominations	1,220

Netflix is an American over-the-top content platform and production company.

In 2013, Netflix became the first streaming platform whose TV production won a Primetime Emmy Award with House of Cards becoming the first online-only streaming television series to receive major nominations for the 65th Primetime Emmy Awards. House of Cards scored nine nominations overall, including Outstanding Drama Series. Meanwhile, its first episode, "Chapter 1", received four nominations, becoming the first webisode (online-only episode) of a television series to receive a major Primetime Emmy Award nomination. Laray Mayfield and Julie Schubert won Outstanding Casting for a Drama Series while Eigil Bryld won for Outstanding Cinematography for a Single-Camera Series (One Hour); meanwhile, David Fincher won for Outstanding Directing for a Drama Series. Both Bryld and Fincher won for the episode "Chapter 1", making it the first Emmy-winning webisode; Jeff Beal was also nominated for Outstanding Music Composition for a Series (Original Dramatic Score) for the same episode. The series was nominated for Outstanding Drama Series four more times, receiving nominations for its first five seasons; however, it wasn't nominated for its sixth and final season.

In 2014, Orange Is the New Black's first season was submitted and nominated for Outstanding Comedy Series while the second season received a nomination for Outstanding Drama Series, becoming the first series to be nominated for both categories. The first season also earned nominations for Outstanding Writing for a Comedy Series and Outstanding Directing for a Comedy Series, for the episodes "I Wasn't Ready" and "Lesbian Request Denied", respectively.

In 2020, programs produced by Netflix set an all-time record by receiving 160 nominations, the most nominations produced by a single network in a single year. In total, programs produced by the streaming service received over 600 nominations and won 112; 3 wins of 14 nominations in 2013, 7 wins of 31 nominations in 2014, 2 wins of 34 nominations in 2015, 9 wins of 54 nominations in 2016, 20 wins of 91 nominations in 2017, 23 wins of 112 nominations in 2018, 27 wins of 118 nominations in 2019, and 21 wins of 160 nominations in 2020.

== Drama ==
=== Drama Series ===
In 2013, House of Cards became the first television series from a streaming service to be nominated for an Emmy Award. In 2014, the Political drama received its second nomination. A year later, Orange Is the New Black was nominated for its first season and House of Cards for its third season. House of Cards was nominated for the fourth consecutive time in 2016. During the ceremony of 2017, three series received nominations in the category: House of Cards, The Crown, and Stranger Things. Both, The Crown and Stranger Things repeated nominations in 2018. In 2019, Bodyguard, and Ozark received nominations. During 2020, Ozark, Stranger Things and The Crown received nominations for its third season. In 2020, Bridgerton made its debut in the category and The Crown was nominated for its fourth season. In 2023, The Crown was nominated for its fifth season. In 2024, The Crown was nominated for its sixth and final season.

House of Cards was nominated five times for its first five seasons.

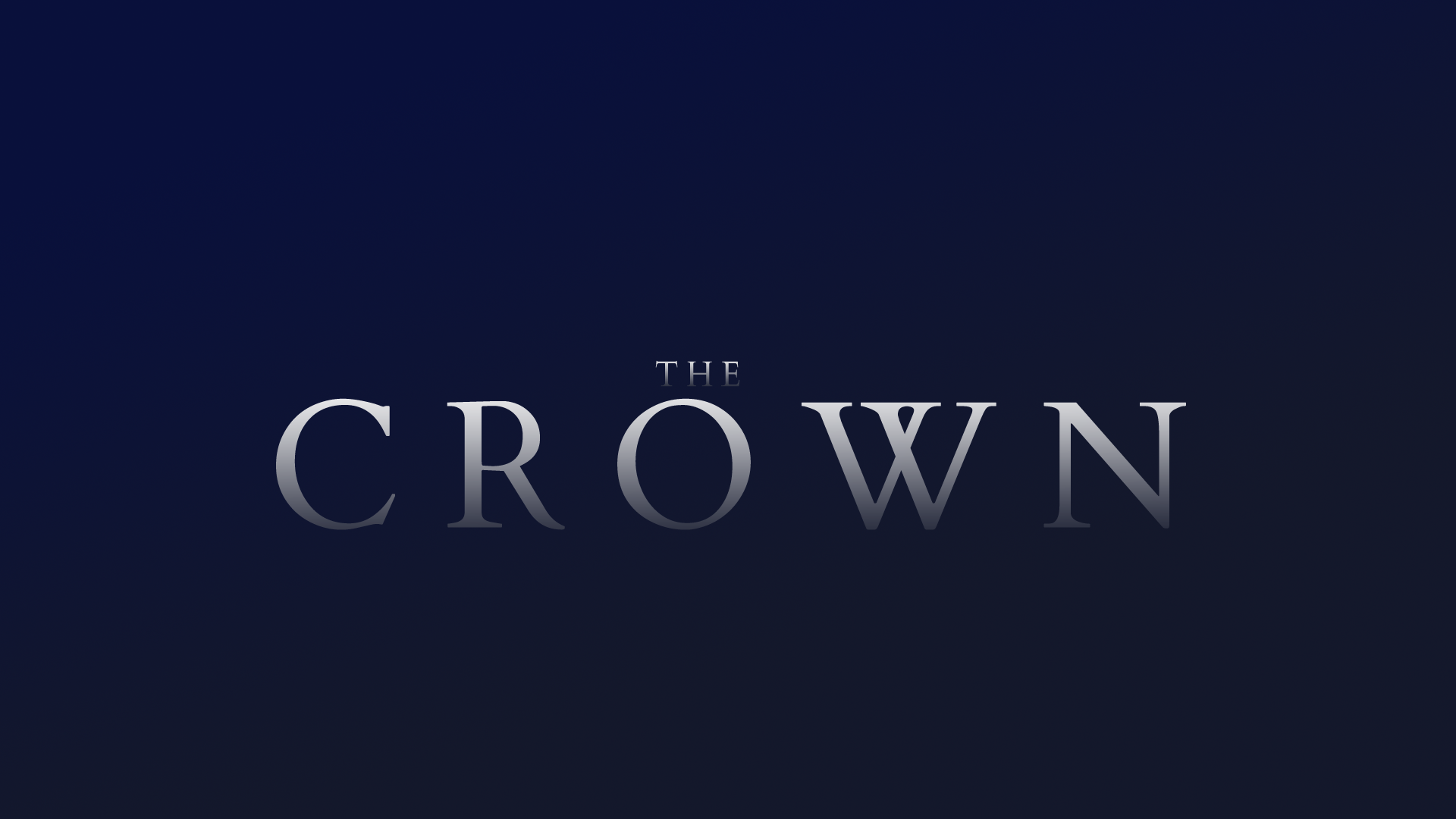
The Crown was the first Netflix's original to win Outstanding Drama Series.

Outstanding Drama Series
Year	Series	Season	Result	Ref.
2013	House of Cards	1	Nominated	
2014	House of Cards	2	Nominated	
2015	House of Cards	3	Nominated	
2015	Orange Is the New Black	2	Nominated	
2016	House of Cards	4	Nominated	
2017	House of Cards	5	Nominated	
2017	Stranger Things	1	Nominated	
2017	The Crown	1	Nominated	
2018	The Crown	2	Nominated	
2018	Stranger Things	2	Nominated	
2019	Bodyguard	1	Nominated	
2019	Ozark	2	Nominated	
2020	Ozark	3	Nominated	
2020	Stranger Things	3	Nominated	
2020	The Crown	3	Nominated	
2021	The Crown	4	Won	
2021	Bridgerton	1	Nominated	
2022	Stranger Things	4	Nominated	
2022	Ozark	4	Nominated	
2022	Squid Game	1	Nominated	
2023	The Crown	5	Nominated	
2024	The Crown	6	Nominated	
2024	3 Body Problem	1	Nominated	
2025	The Diplomat	2	Nominated	

=== Lead Actor/Actress ===
Lead Actor in a Drama Series

In 2013, Kevin Spacey was nominated for his role as Frank Underwood in House of Cards. The following year, the actor received a nomination for the second season of the series. In 2015, Kyle Chandler was nominated in the category alongside Kevin Spacey; both actors repeated nominations in 2016. Kevin Spacey was nominated for the fifth season of House of Cards, in 2017. Jason Bateman was nominated three consecutive times, from 2018 to 2020. He was the only lead nominated in the category during that period. In 2021, Regé-Jean Page and Josh O'Connor, received their first Emmy nomination. Bateman returned to the category in 2022 alongside Lee Jung-jae, who received his first nomination. In 2024, Dominic West received his first nomination for his role as Charles III in the final season of The Crown.

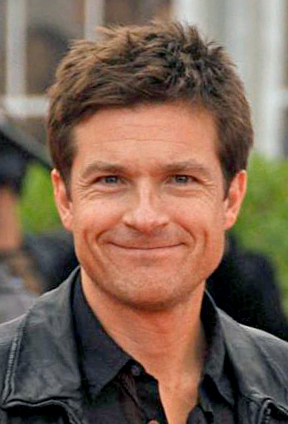
Jason Bateman received four nominations for his performance in Ozark.

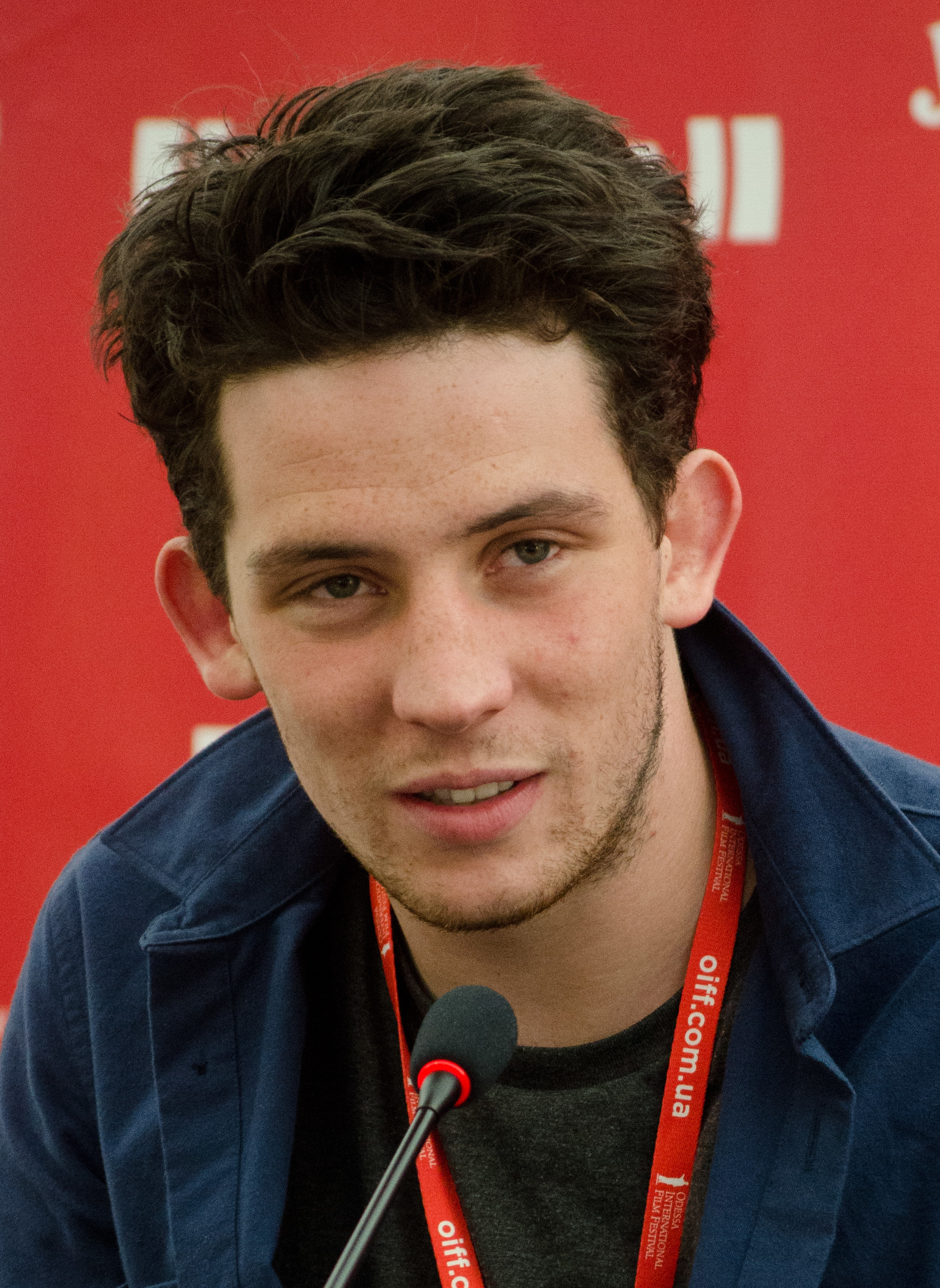
Josh O'Connor won in 2021, for the fourth season of The Crown.

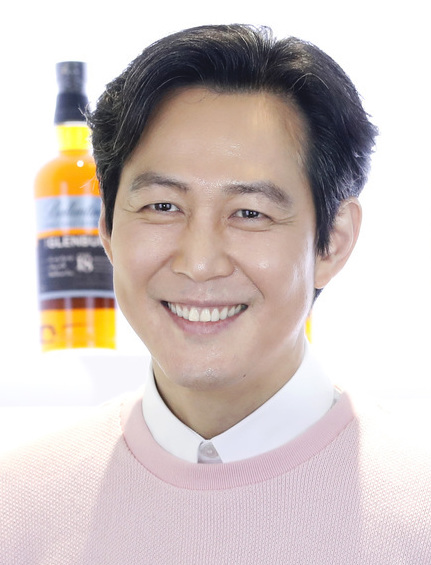
Lee Jung-jae won in 2022 for the first season of Squid Game.

Outstanding Lead Actor in a Drama Series
Year	Series	Season	Actor	Result	Ref.
2013	House of Cards	1	Kevin Spacey	Nominated	
2014	House of Cards	2	Kevin Spacey	Nominated	
2015	House of Cards	3	Kevin Spacey	Nominated	
2015	Bloodline	1	Kyle Chandler	Nominated	
2016	Bloodline	2	Kyle Chandler	Nominated	
2016	House of Cards	4	Kevin Spacey	Nominated	
2017	House of Cards	5	Kevin Spacey	Nominated	
2018	Ozark	1	Jason Bateman	Nominated	
2019	Ozark	2	Jason Bateman	Nominated	
2020	Ozark	3	Jason Bateman	Nominated	
2021	The Crown	4	Josh O'Connor	Won	
2021	Bridgerton	1	Regé-Jean Page	Nominated	
2022	Squid Game	1	Lee Jung-jae	Won	
2022	Ozark	4	Jason Bateman	Nominated	
2024	The Crown	6	Dominic West	Nominated	

Lead Actress in a Drama Series

Robin Wright was the only lead nominated, from 2013 to 2016. In 2017, Wright received her fifth nomination and Claire Foy received her first. In 2018, Foy won for her role as Queen Elizabeth II in The Crown. She became the first actress from a series produced by Netflix to win. During the 70th Primetime Emmy Awards, Laura Linney was nominated for the second season of Ozark and received additional nominations in 2020 and 2022. Robin Wright received a nomination for the last season of House of Cards. In 2020, Laura Linney and Olivia Colman were nominated. During 2021, Emma Corrin was nominated for her role as Princess Diana and Olivia Colman as Queen Elizabeth II, in The Crown. In 2023, Keri Russell was nominated for her role as a US ambassador to the UK in The Diplomat. In 2024, Imelda Staunton was nominated for her role as Queen Elizabeth II in the final season of The Crown.

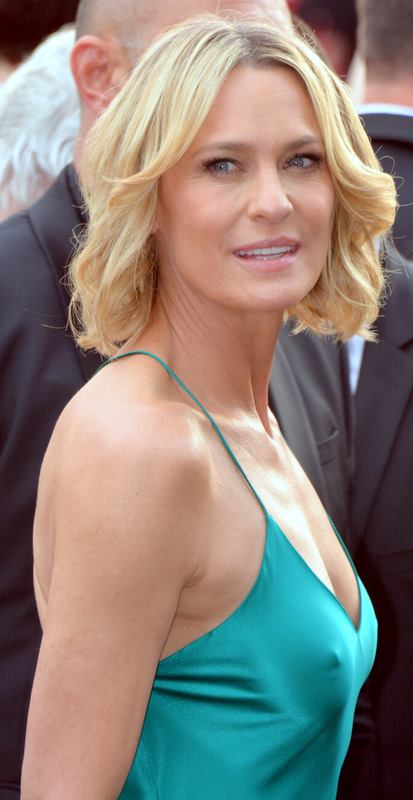
Robin Wright received six nominations for her work in House of Cards.

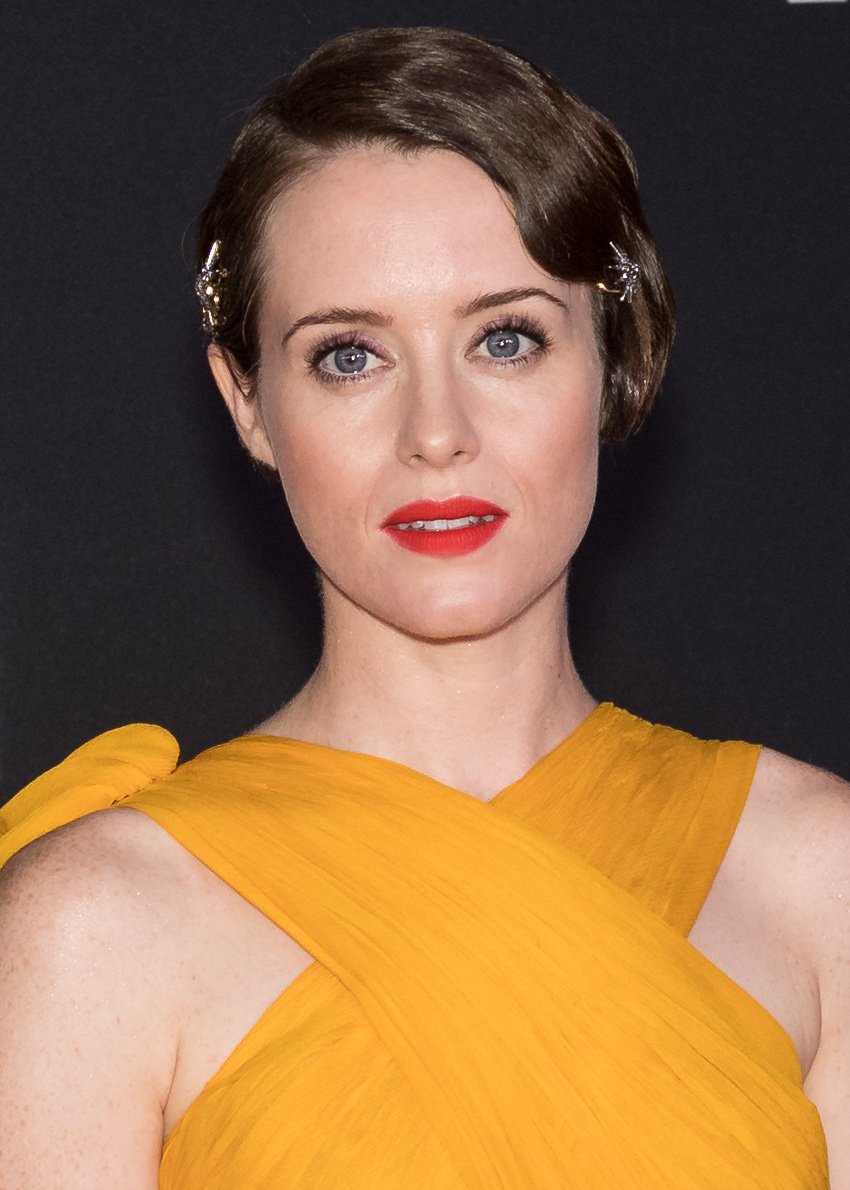
Claire Foy won for her performance as Queen Elizabeth II in The Crown.

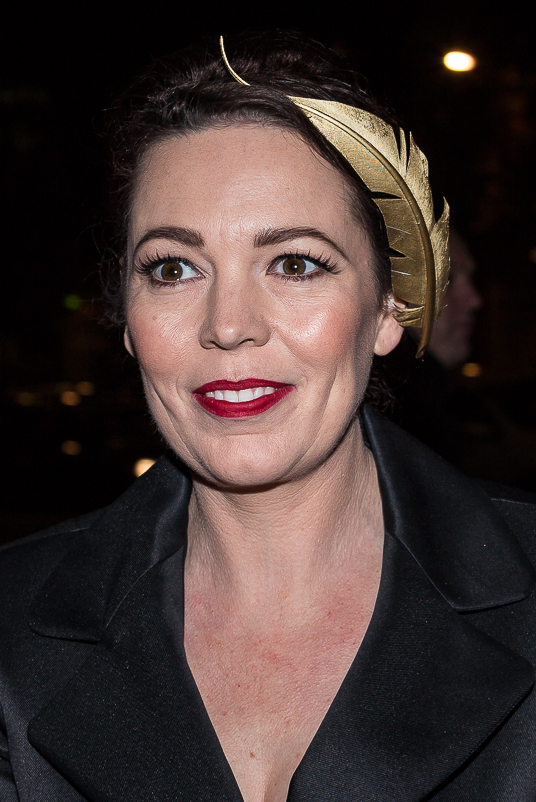
Olivia Colman was nominated for season three and four of The Crown, winning the latter.

Outstanding Lead Actress in a Drama Series
Year	Series	Season	Actress	Result	Ref.
2013	House of Cards	1	Robin Wright	Nominated	
2014	House of Cards	2	Robin Wright	Nominated	
2015	House of Cards	3	Robin Wright	Nominated	
2016	House of Cards	4	Robin Wright	Nominated	
2017	House of Cards	5	Robin Wright	Nominated	
2017	The Crown	1	Claire Foy	Nominated	
2018	The Crown	2	Claire Foy	Won	
2019	House of Cards	6	Robin Wright	Nominated	
2019	Ozark	2	Laura Linney	Nominated	
2020	Ozark	3	Laura Linney	Nominated	
2020	The Crown	3	Olivia Colman	Nominated	
2021	The Crown	4	Olivia Colman	Won	
2021	The Crown	4	Emma Corrin	Nominated	
2022	Ozark	4	Laura Linney	Nominated	
2023	The Diplomat	1	Keri Russell	Nominated	
2024	The Crown	6	Imelda Staunton	Nominated	
2025	The Diplomat	2	Keri Russell	Nominated	

=== Supporting Actor/Actress ===
Supporting Actor in a Drama Series

Michael Kelly and Ben Mendelsohn were nominated in the category in 2015. In 2016, both Kelly and Mendelsohn received nominations, with Mendelsohn winning the award. In 2017, John Lithgow won for his role as Winston Churchill in The Crown. Michael Kelly and David Harbour were nominated. During the 2018 ceremony, Matt Smith received his first Emmy nomination for the second season of The Crown. In addition, David Harbor was nominated for the second season of Stranger Things. In 2019, Michael Kelly was nominated for the final season of House of Cards. For his role in The Crown, Tobias Menzies, won the award in 2021. Both Park Hae-soo and O Yeong-su received their first nominations in 2022 for Squid Game. In 2024, Jonathan Pryce received a nomination for his role as Prince Philip, Duke of Edinburgh in the final season of The Crown.

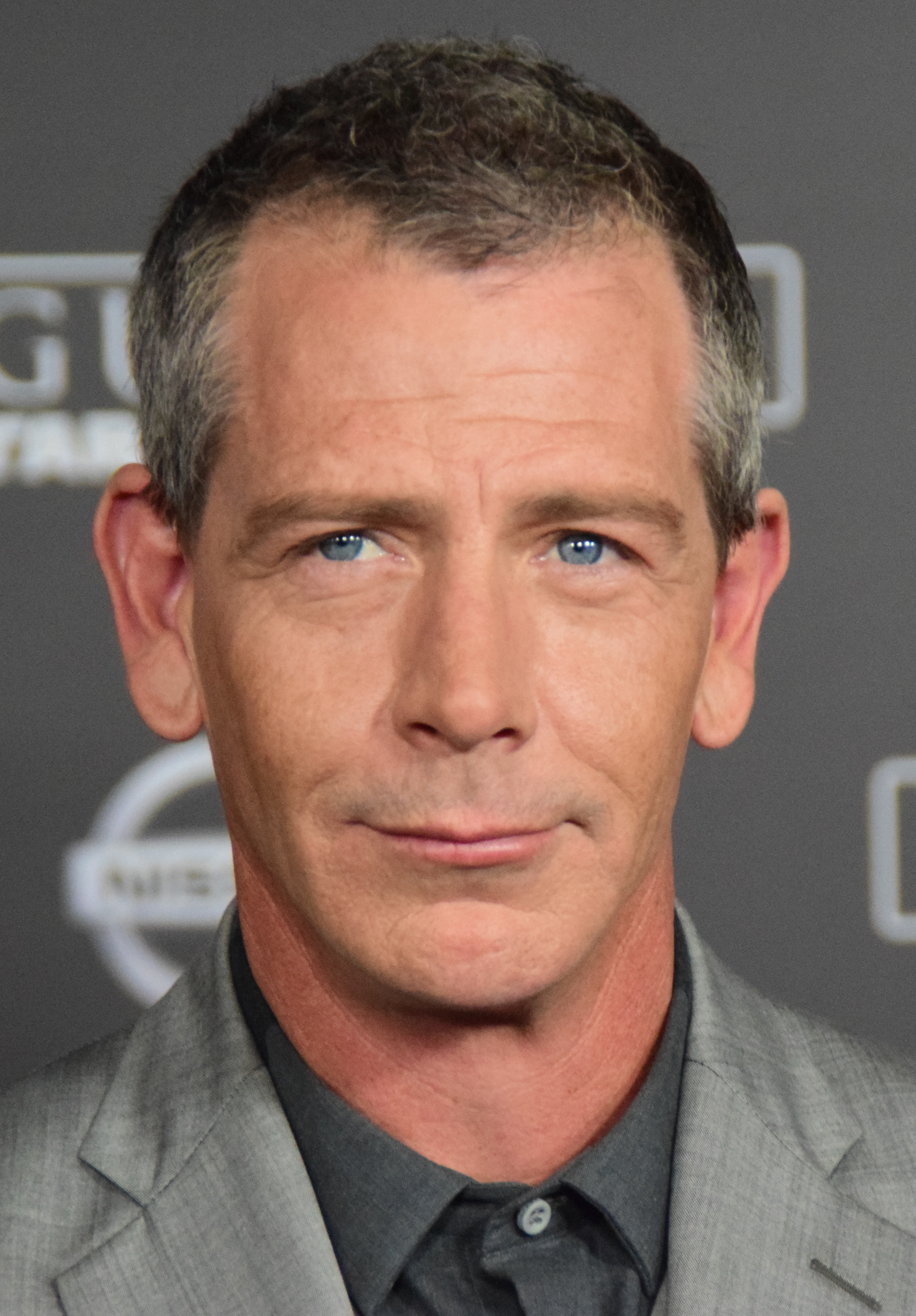
In 2016, Ben Mendelsohn, became the first actor from a Netflix's program to winan Emmy.

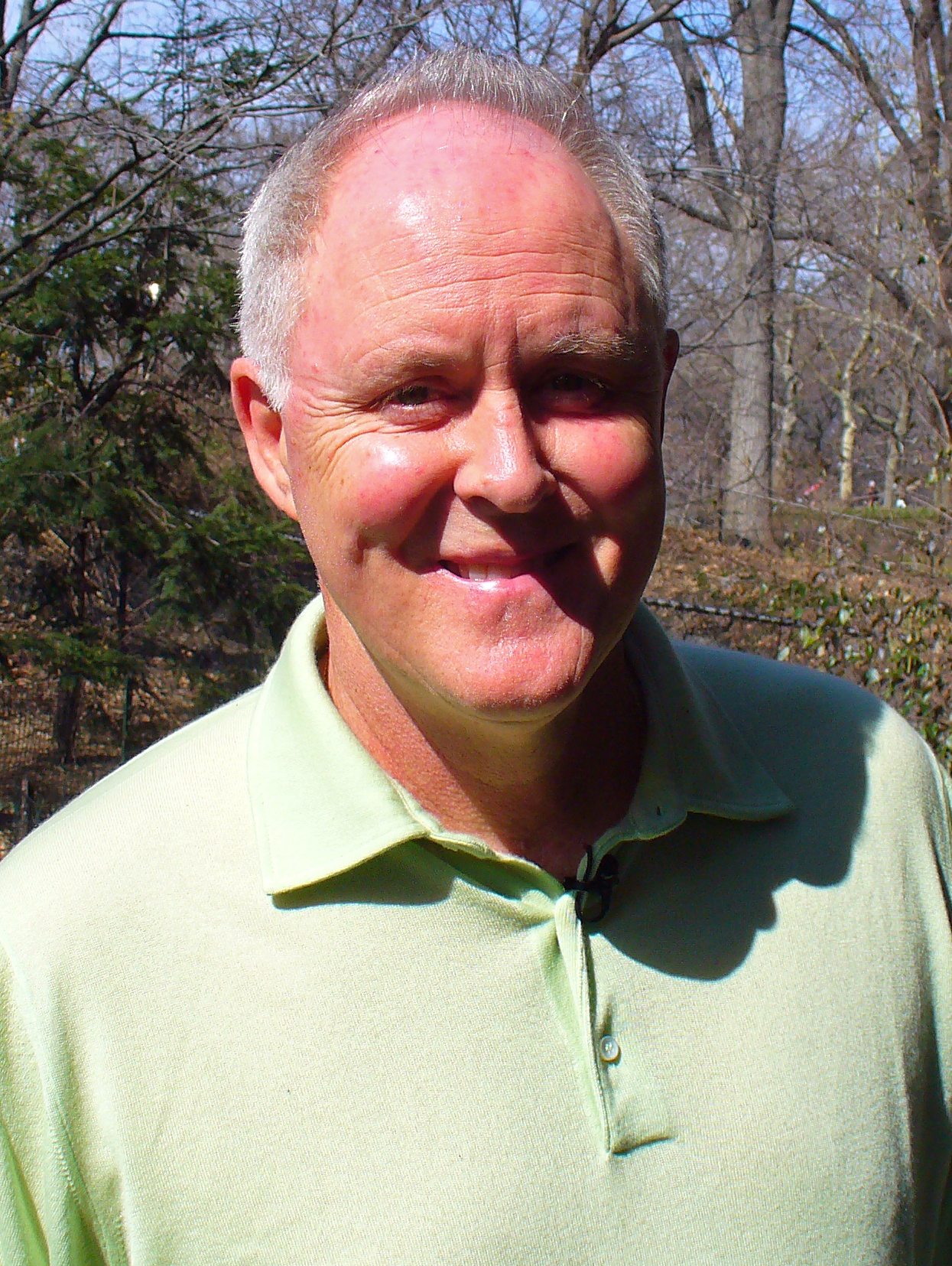
John Lithgow won for the second season of The Crown.

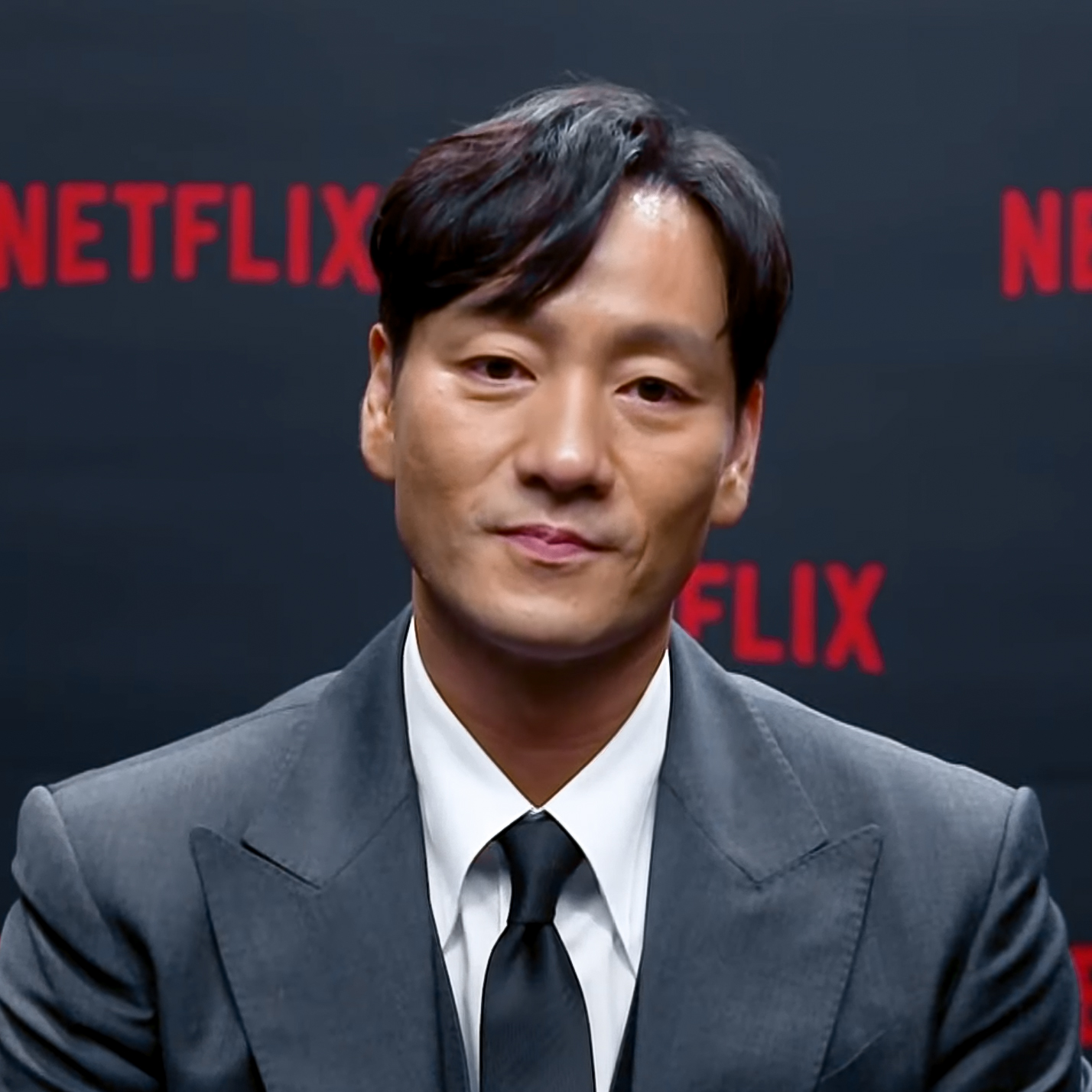
Park Hae-soo scored his first Emmy nomination in 2022.

Outstanding Supporting Actor in a Drama Series
Year	Series	Season	Actor	Result	Ref.
2015	House of Cards	3	Michael Kelly	Nominated	
2015	Bloodline	1	Ben Mendelsohn	Nominated	
2016	Bloodline	2	Ben Mendelsohn	Won	
2016	House of Cards	4	Michael Kelly	Nominated	
2017	House of Cards	5	Michael Kelly	Nominated	
2017	The Crown	1	John Lithgow	Won	
2017	Stranger Things	1	David Harbour	Nominated	
2018	Stranger Things	2	David Harbour	Nominated	
2018	The Crown	2	Matt Smith	Nominated	
2019	House of Cards	6	Michael Kelly	Nominated	
2021	The Crown	4	Tobias Menzies	Won	
2022	Squid Game	1	O Yeong-su	Nominated	
2022	Squid Game	1	Park Hae-soo	Nominated	
2024	The Crown	6	Jonathan Pryce	Nominated	

Supporting Actress in a Drama Series

Uzo Aduba won her second Emmy for Orange Is the New Black in 2015. Aduba and Millie Bobby Brown received nominations during the 69th Primetime Emmy Awards. In 2018, Vanessa Kiby and Millie Bobby Brown were nominated. Julia Garner won two consecutive years, 2019 and 2020, for her role as Ruth Langmore in Ozark and won a third time in 2022 for the show's final season. In 2020, Helena Bonham Carter was nominated for her role as Princess Margaret in the third season of The Crown and received another nomination in 2021 alongside co-stars Emerald Fennell, and eventual winner Gillian Anderson. HoYeon Jung received her first nomination in 2022 for her work on Squid Game. Elizabeth Debicki was nominated for her role as Diana, Princess of Wales in the fifth and sixth season of The Crown.

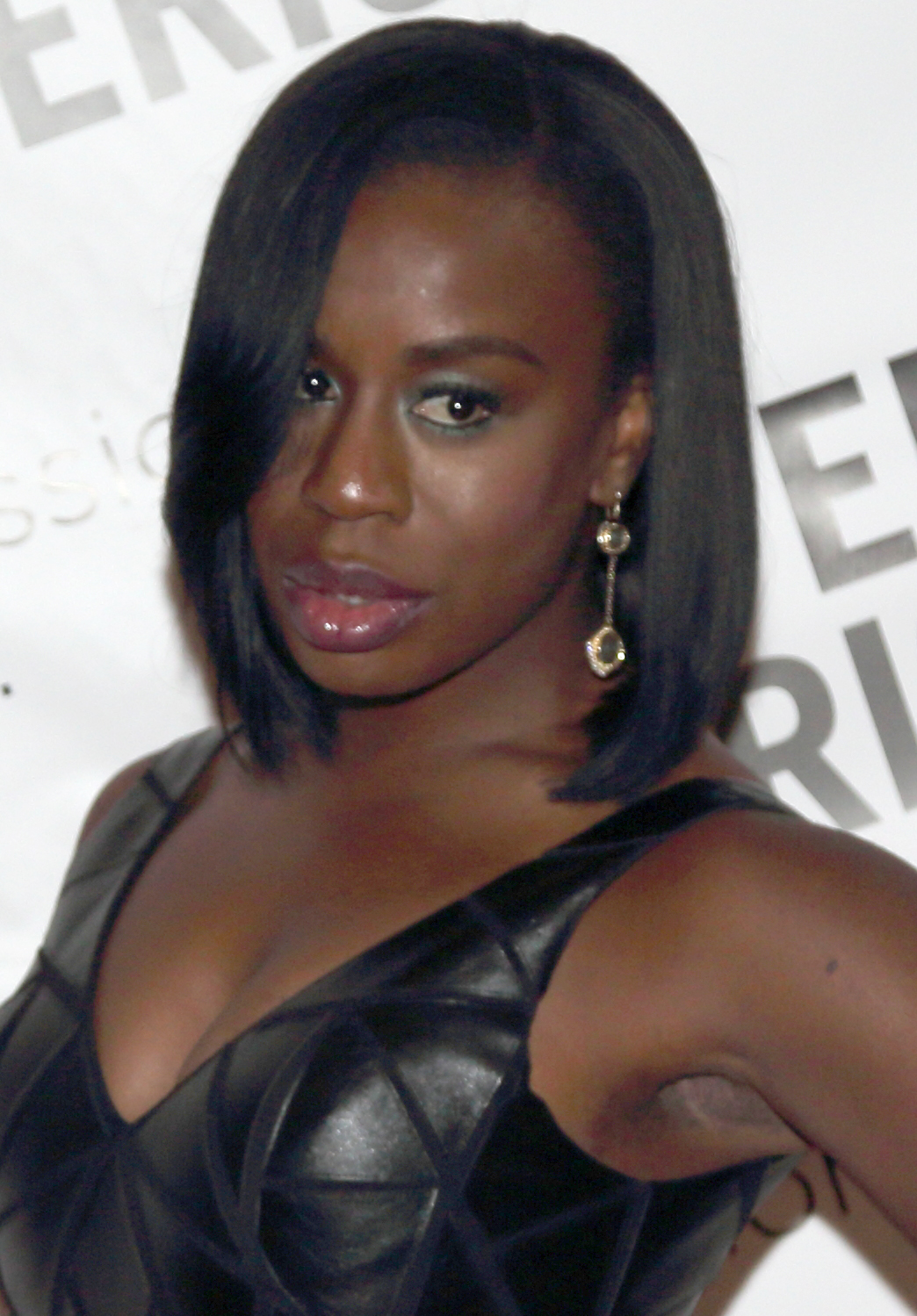
Uzo Aduba was the first actress from a Netflix program to win in the category.

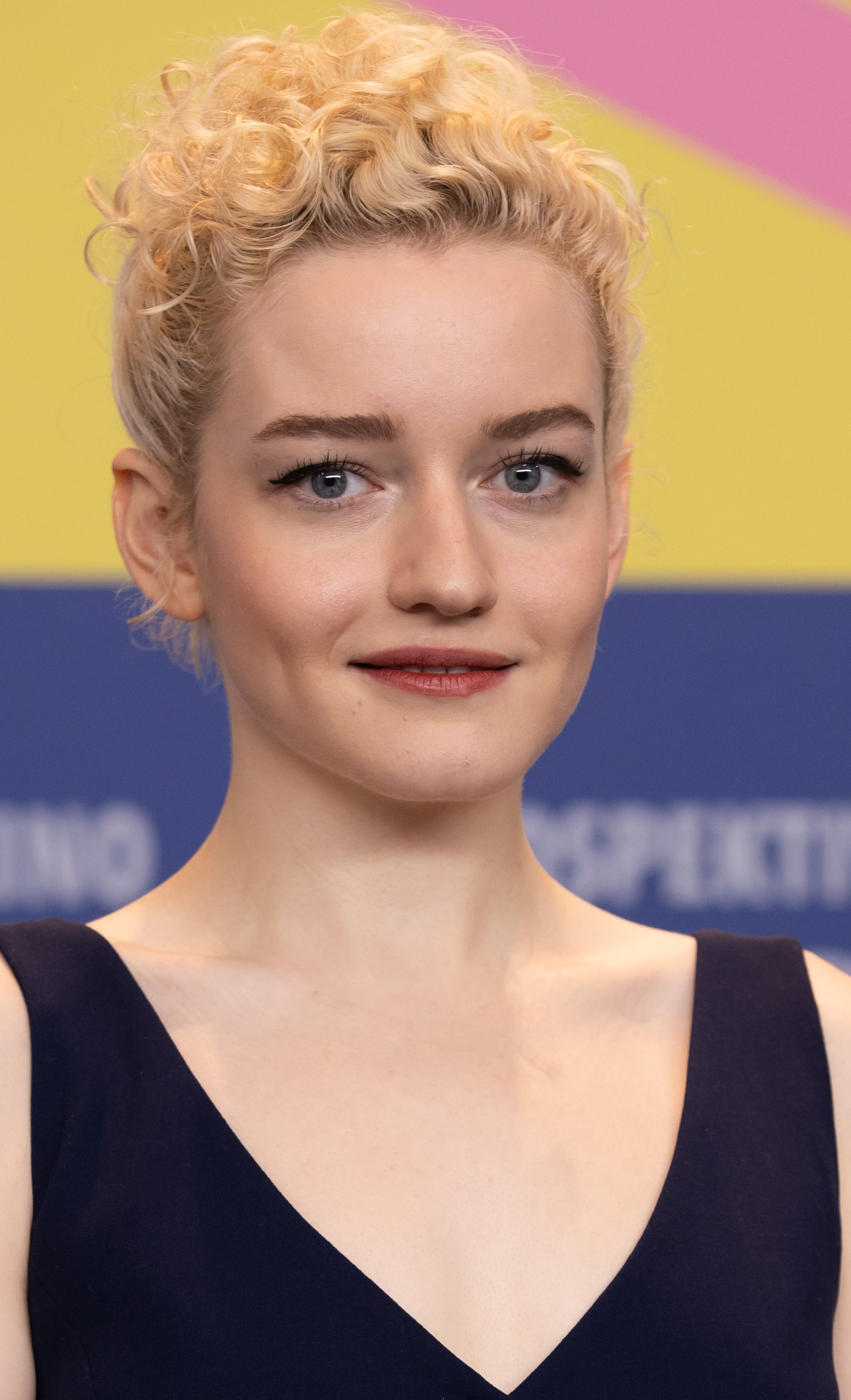
Julia Garner won three times for her role in Ozark, receiving two awards consecutively.

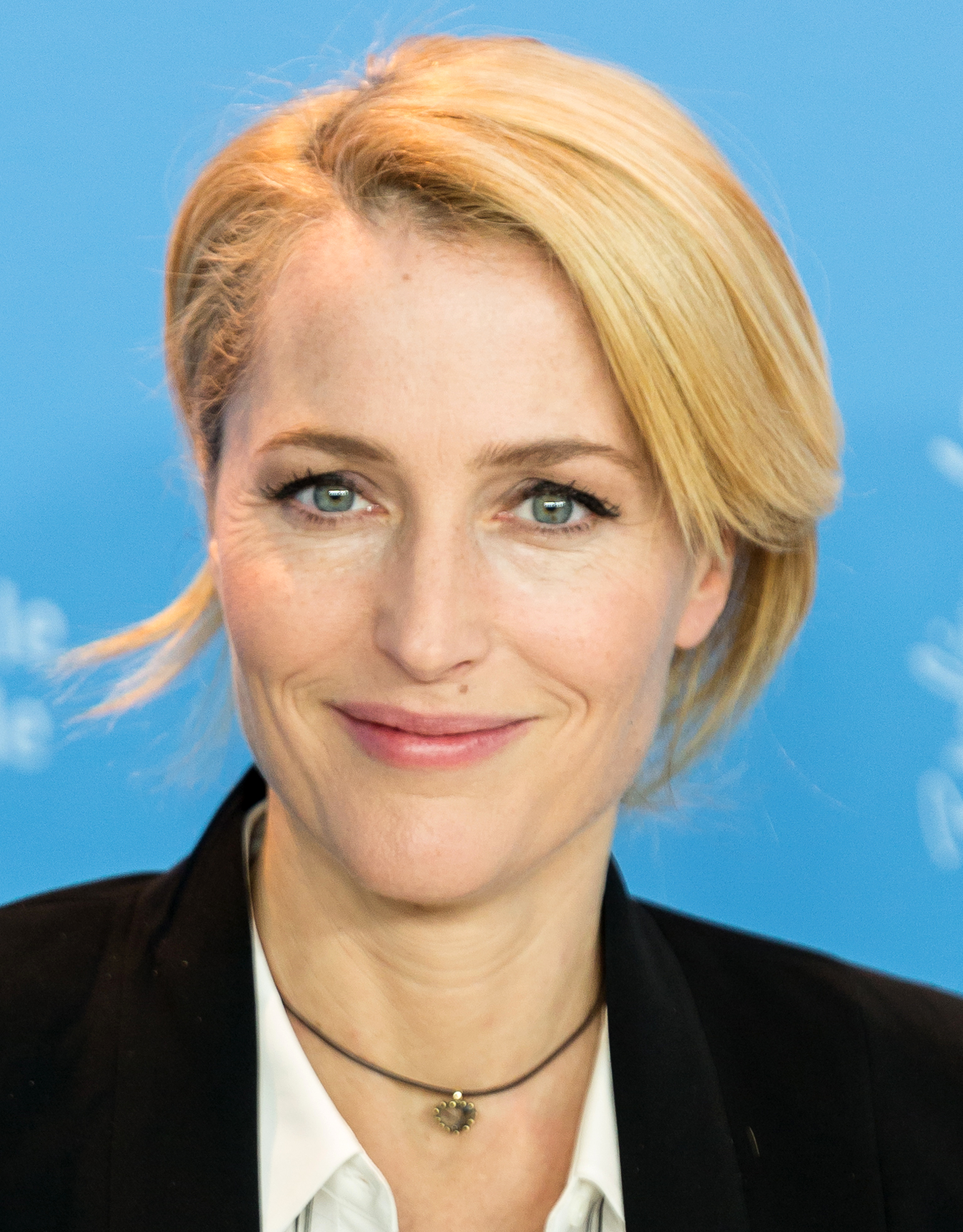
Gillian Anderson won in 2021, becoming the third consecutive Supporting Actress award received by an actress in a Netflix's program.

Outstanding Supporting Actress in a Drama Series
Year	Series	Season	Actress	Result	Ref.
2015	Orange Is the New Black	2	Uzo Aduba	Won	
2017	Orange Is the New Black	4	Uzo Aduba	Nominated	
2017	Stranger Things	1	Millie Bobby Brown	Nominated	
2018	Stranger Things	2	Millie Bobby Brown	Nominated	
2018	The Crown	2	Vanessa Kirby	Nominated	
2019	Ozark	2	Julia Garner	Won	
2020	Ozark	3	Julia Garner	Won	
2020	The Crown	3	Helena Bonham Carter	Nominated	
2021	The Crown	4	Helena Bonham Carter	Nominated	
2021	The Crown	4	Gillian Anderson	Won	
2021	The Crown	4	Emerald Fennell	Nominated	
2022	Squid Game	1	Jung Ho-yeon	Nominated	
2022	Ozark	4	Julia Garner	Won	
2023	The Crown	5	Elizabeth Debicki	Nominated	
2024	The Crown	6	Elizabeth Debicki	Won	
2024	The Crown	6	Lesley Manville	Nominated	

=== Guest Actor/Actress ===
Guest Actor in a Drama Series

Reg E. Cathey was nominated in 2014 and won in 2015. Pablo Schreiber received a nomination for portraying George "Pornstache" Mendez in Orange Is the New Black. During the 2016 ceremony, Mahershala Ali, Paul Sparks, and Reg E. Cathey were nominated for House of Cards. Ben Mendelsohn received a nomination for the last season of Bloodline. In 2018, Cameron Britton was nominated for Mindhunter and Matthew Goode for The Crown. Andrew Scott was nominated, in 2020, for Black Mirror. During the 73rd Primetime Creative Arts Emmy Awards, Charles Dance received a nomination for his role as Lord Mountbatten in The Crown.

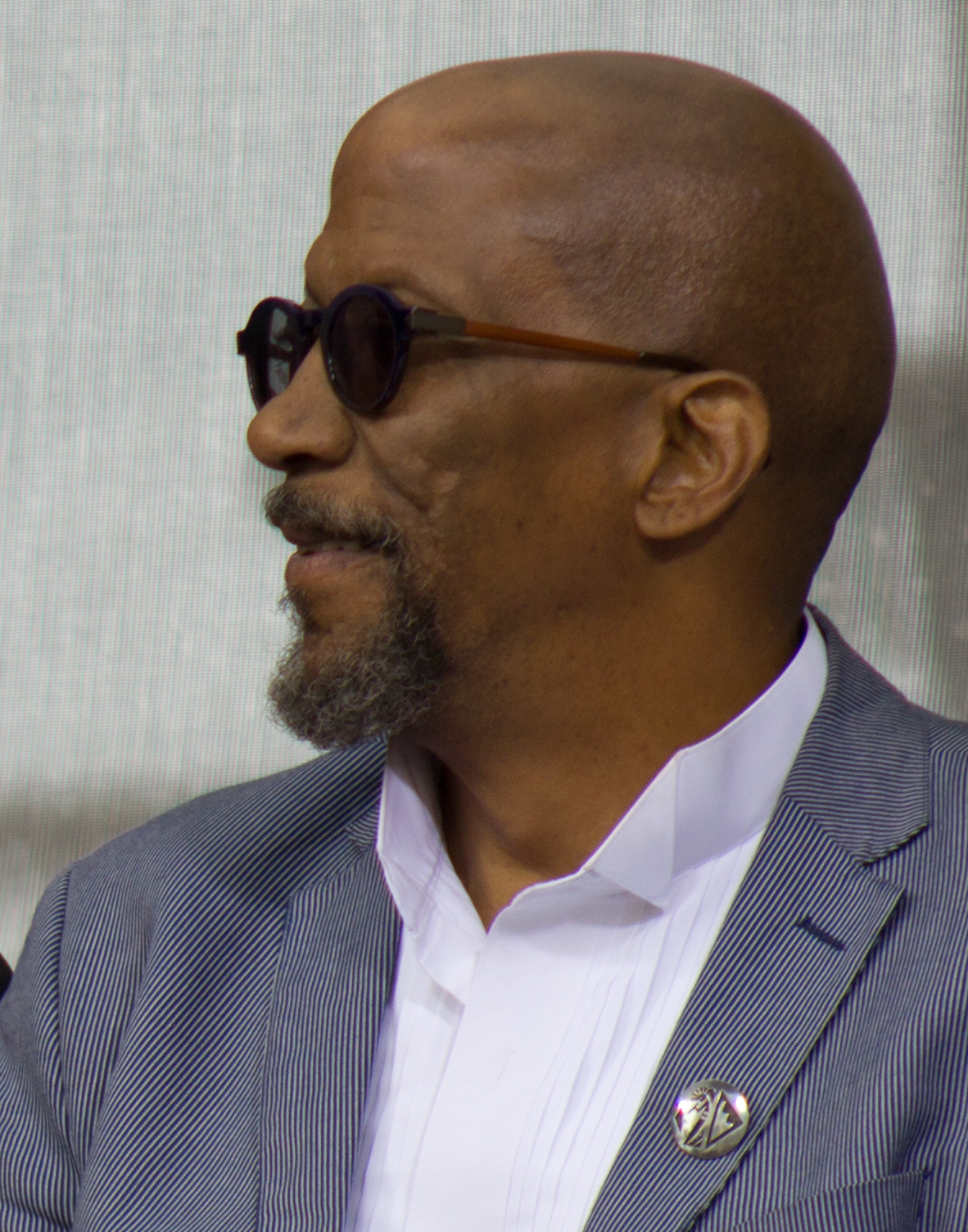
Reg E. Cathey won for his role in the third season of House of Cards .

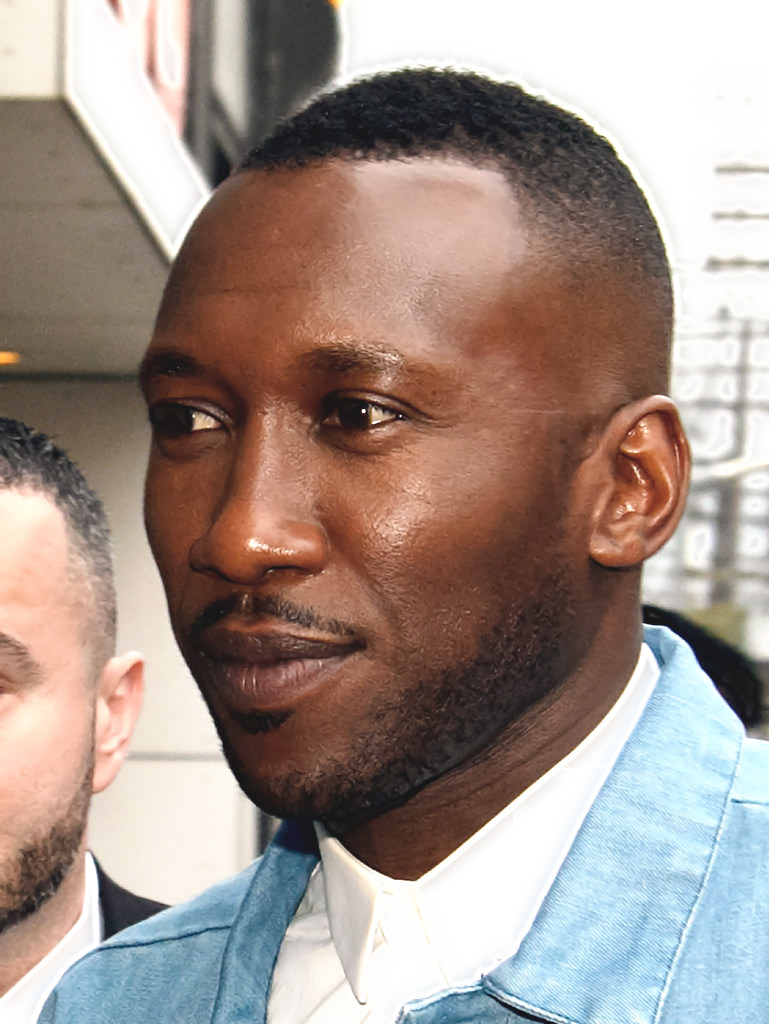
Mahershala Ali was nominated for his first Emmy in 2016.

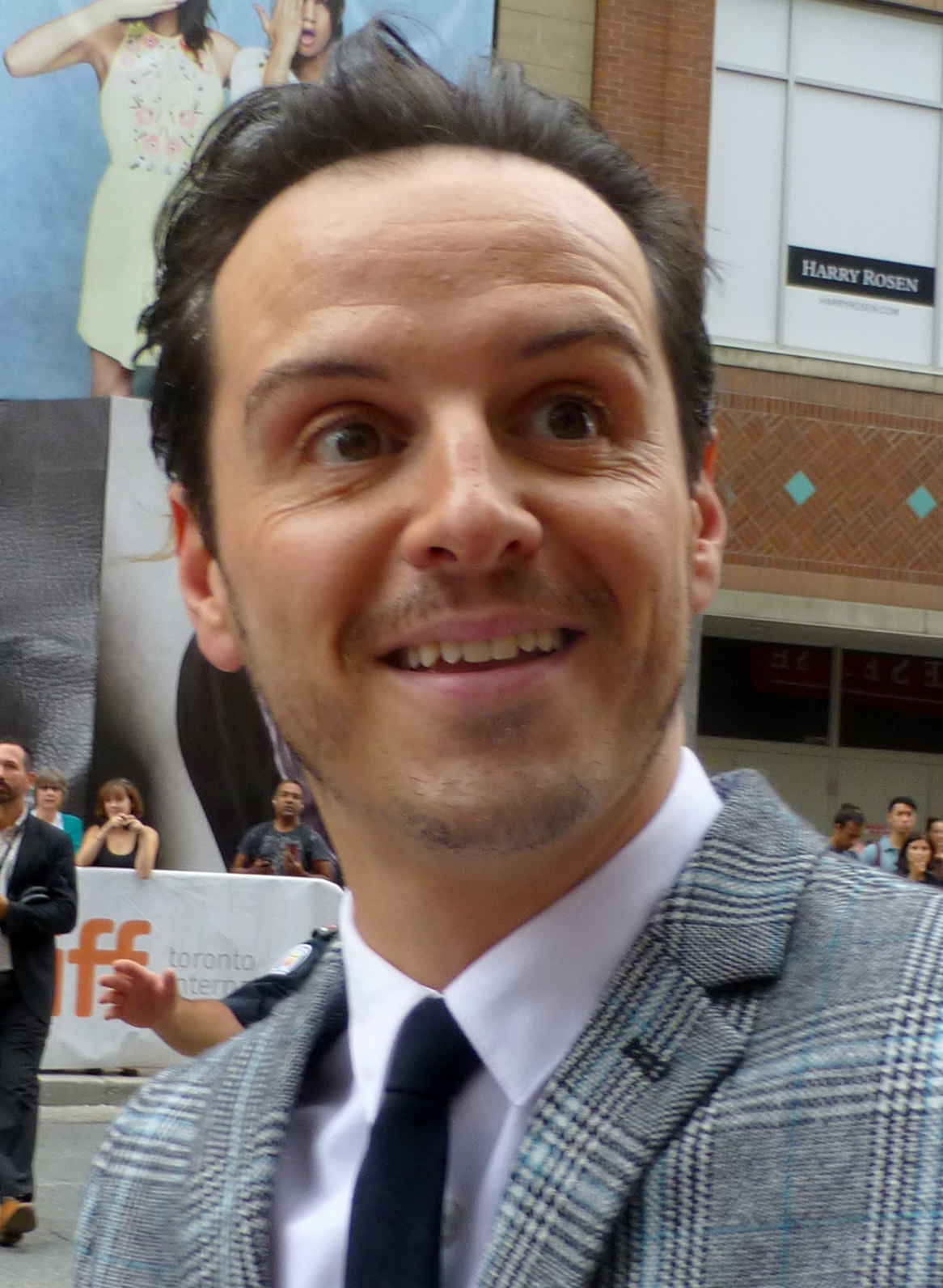
Andrew Scott was nominated for his performance on Black Mirror.

Outstanding Guest Actor in a Drama Series
Year	Series	Season	Actor	Result	Ref.
2014	House of Cards	2	Reg E. Cathey	Nominated	
2015	House of Cards	3	Reg E. Cathey	Won	
2015	Orange Is the New Black	2	Pablo Schreiber	Nominated	
2016	House of Cards	4	Mahershala Ali	Nominated	
2016	House of Cards	4	Reg E. Cathey	Nominated	
2016	House of Cards	4	Paul Sparks	Nominated	
2017	Bloodline	3	Ben Mendelsohn	Nominated	
2018	Mindhunter	1	Cameron Britton	Nominated	
2018	The Crown	2	Matthew Goode	Nominated	
2020	Black Mirror	5	Andrew Scott	Nominated	
2021	The Crown	4	Charles Dance	Nominated	
2022	Ozark	4	Tom Pelphrey	Nominated	

Guest Actress in a Drama Series

In 2014, Kate Mara received a nomination for her role in House of Cards. The following year, Rachel Brosnahan was nominated for the third season of the series. In 2016, Ellen Burstyn and Molly Parker received nominations for the fourth season of House of Cards. At the 2017 ceremony, the streaming service scored two nominations, with Shannon Purser for Stranger Things and Laverne Cox for Orange Is the New Black. Cox was nominated in 2019 and 2020. In 2021, Claire Foy won her second Emmy for The Crown. In addition, Sophie Okonedo was nominated for Ratched. Lee Yoo-mi won on her first nomination in 2022 for her work on Squid Game. In 2024, Claire Foy received a fourth nomination for her role as Queen Elizabeth II in The Crown.

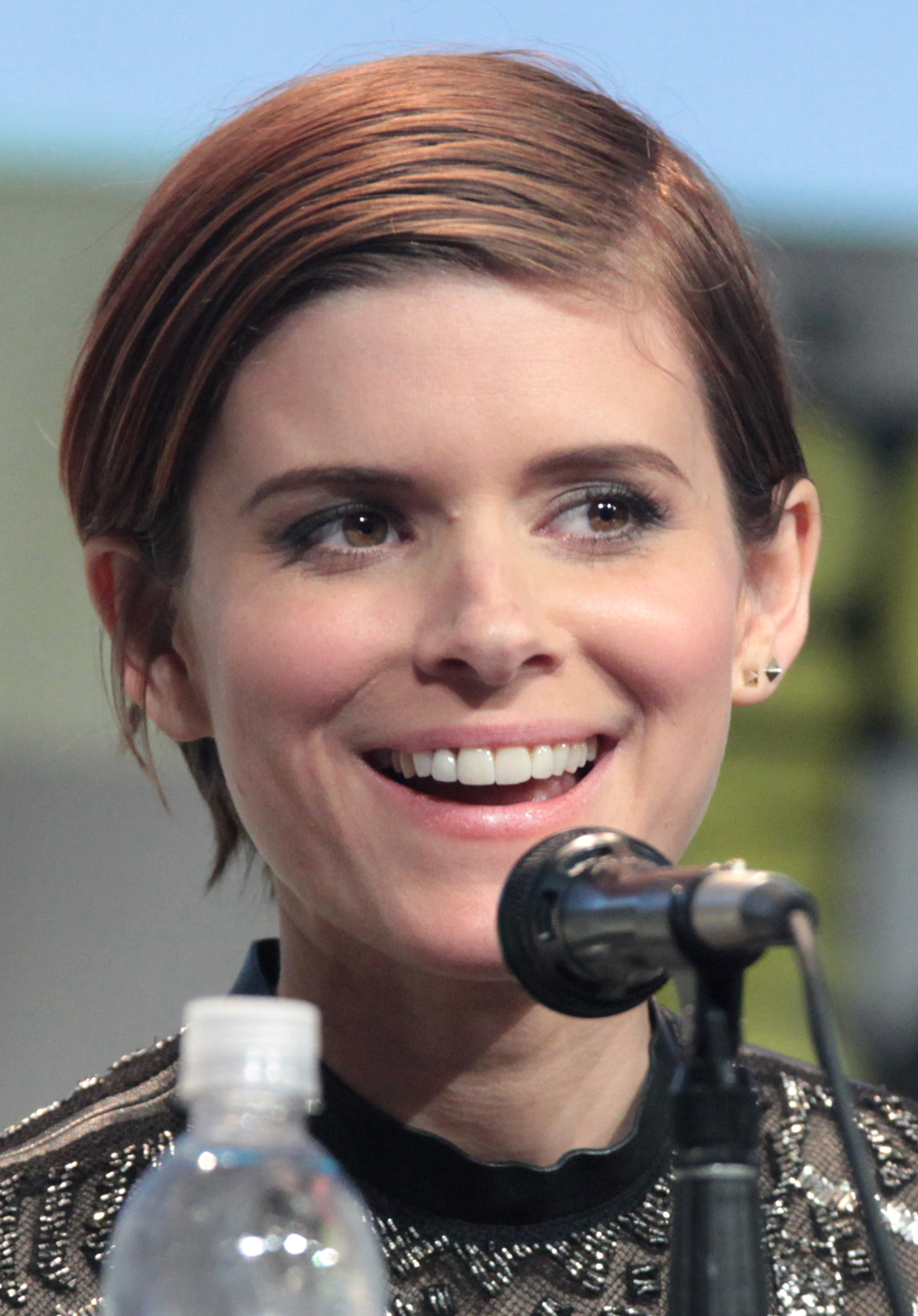
Kate Mara got nominated in 2014, for her role in House of Cards.

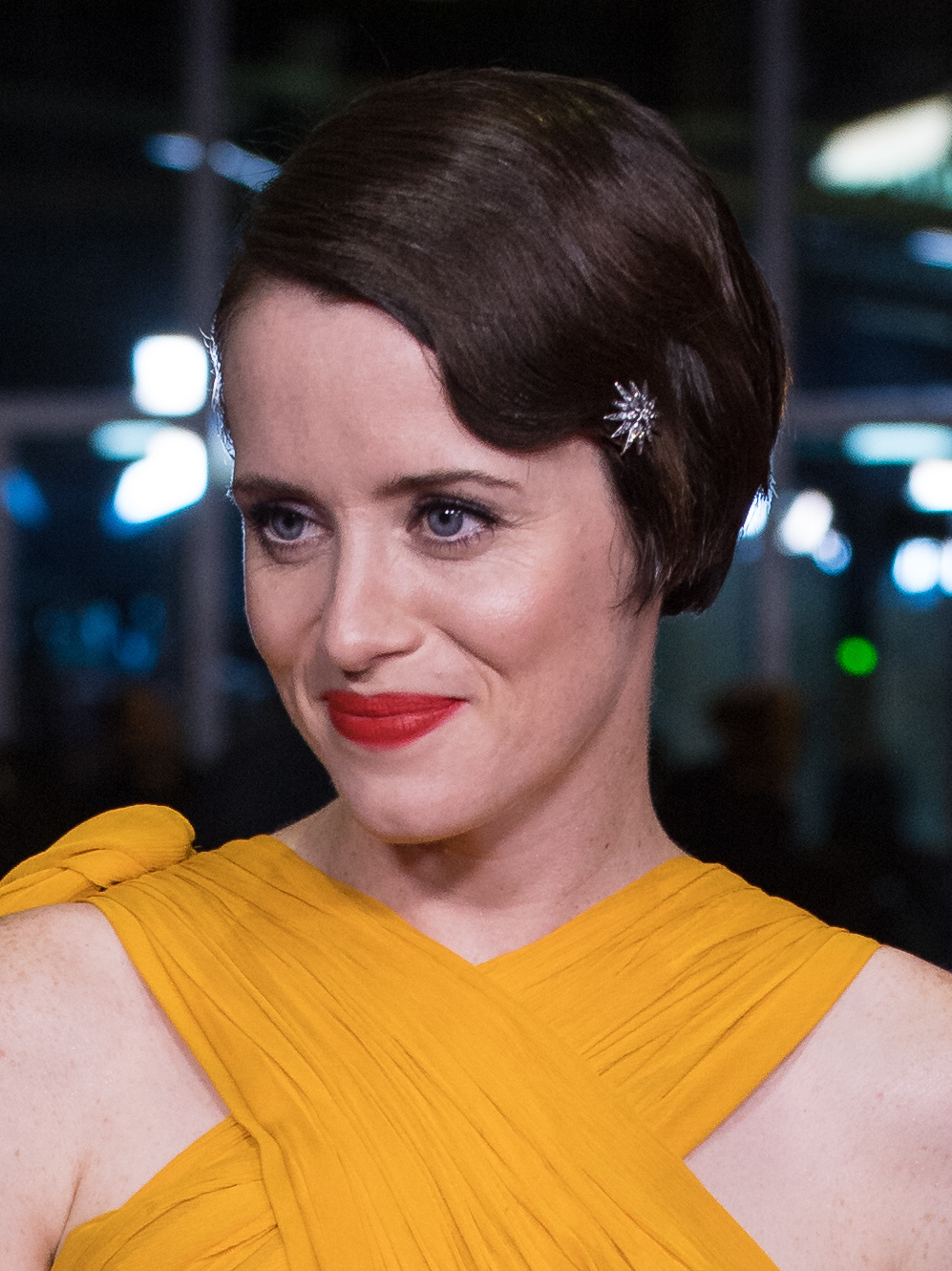
Claire Foy won for the fourth season of The Crown.

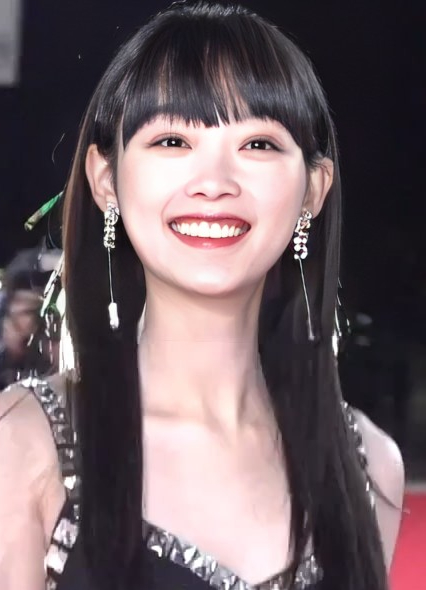
Lee Yoo-mi won for her role in Squid Game.

Outstanding Guest Actress in a Drama Series
Year	Series	Season	Actress	Result	Ref.
2014	House of Cards	2	Kate Mara	Nominated	
2015	House of Cards	3	Rachel Brosnahan	Nominated	
2016	House of Cards	4	Ellen Burstyn	Nominated	
2016	House of Cards	4	Molly Parker	Nominated	
2017	Stranger Things	1	Shannon Purser	Nominated	
2017	Orange Is the New Black	4	Laverne Cox	Nominated	
2019	Orange Is the New Black	6	Laverne Cox	Nominated	
2020	Orange Is the New Black	7	Laverne Cox	Nominated	
2021	The Crown	4	Claire Foy	Won	
2021	Ratched	1	Sophie Okonedo	Nominated	
2022	Squid Game	1	Lee Yoo-mi	Won	
2024	The Crown	6	Claire Foy	Nominated	

=== Directing and Writing ===
Outstanding Directing for a Drama Series

In 2013, David Fincher won for his work in House of Cards. The Duffer Brothers received two nominations for the first and second seasons of Stranger Things. The Crown has received six nominations, winning twice. Ozark was nominated six times, with Jason Bateman winning in 2019. Both, Bridgerton and Squid Game, were nominated for its debut seasons. Directors of Netflix's programs received eighteen nominations, winning four times. In 2024, The Crown received a seventh nomination for this category.

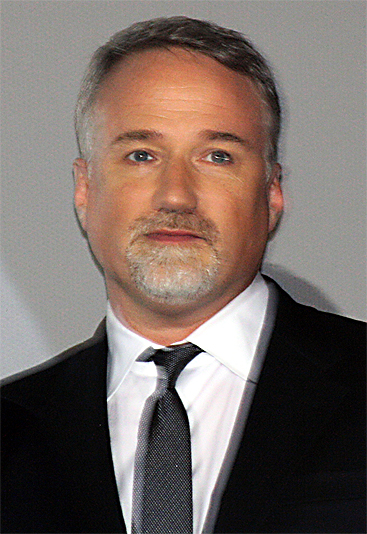
2013 winner, David Fincher directed the first episode of season one of House of Cards.

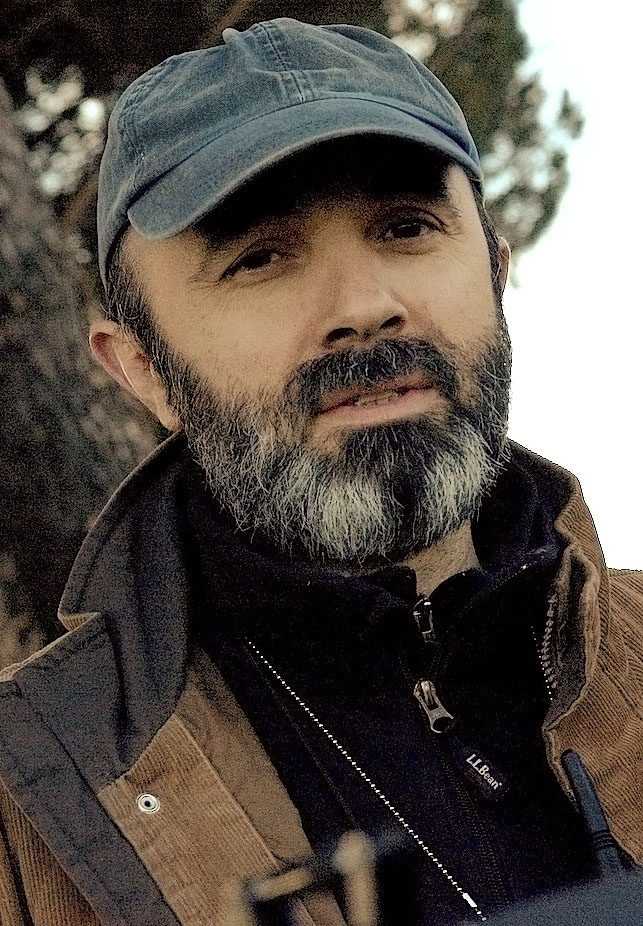
Alik Sakharov was nominated during the 72nd Primetime Emmy Awards.

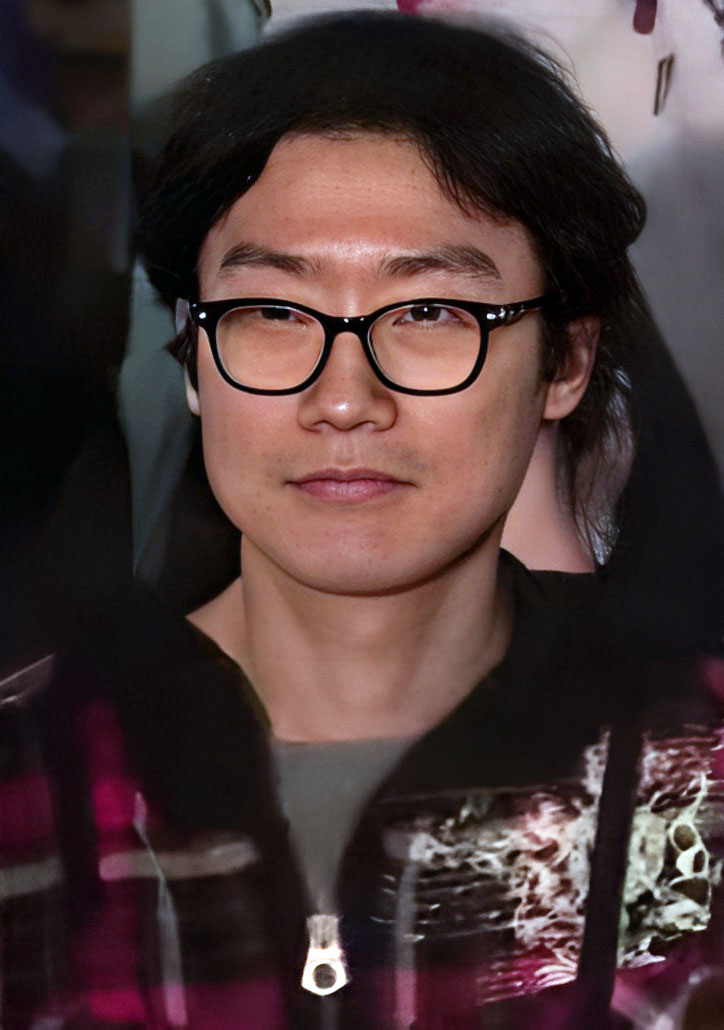
Hwang Dong-hyuk received a nomination for his work in Squid Game.

Outstanding Directing for a Drama Series
Year	Series	Season	Director	Result	Ref.
2013	House of Cards	1	David Fincher	Won	
2014	House of Cards	2	Carl Franklin	Nominated	
2017	Stranger Things	1	The Duffer Brothers	Nominated	
2017	The Crown	1	Stephen Daldry	Nominated	
2018	The Crown	2	Stephen Daldry	Won	
2018	Stranger Things	2	The Duffer Brothers	Nominated	
2018	Ozark	1	Daniel Sackheim	Nominated	
2018	Ozark	1	Jason Bateman	Nominated	
2019	Ozark	2	Jason Bateman	Won	
2020	Ozark	3	Alik Sakharov	Nominated	
2020	Ozark	3	Ben Semanoff	Nominated	
2020	The Crown	3	Jessica Hobbs	Nominated	
2020	The Crown	3	Benjamin Caron	Nominated	
2021	The Crown	4	Benjamin Caron	Nominated	
2021	The Crown	4	Jessica Hobbs	Won	
2021	Bridgerton	1	Julie Anne Robinson	Nominated	
2022	Squid Game	1	Hwang Dong-hyuk	Won	
2022	Ozark	4	Jason Bateman	Nominated	
2024	The Crown	6	Stephen Daldry	Nominated	

Outstanding Writing for a Drama Series

Writers of Netflix's programs received their first writing nomination in 2013, with House of Cards. In 2017, The Crown and Stranger Things scored nominations for its debut season. Both shows received nominations for its second season. Jed Mercurio was nominated for his work in Bodyguard. In 2020, Ozark received three nominations for episodes "All In", "Boss Fight", and "Fire Pink". Peter Morgan was nominated for seasons three and four of The Crown, winning the latter. In 2022, Hwang Dong-hyuk was nominated for writing episode "One Lucky Day" from the first season of Squid Game. In 2024, Peter Morgan received a nomination for The Crown, bringing his total nominations in this category to five.

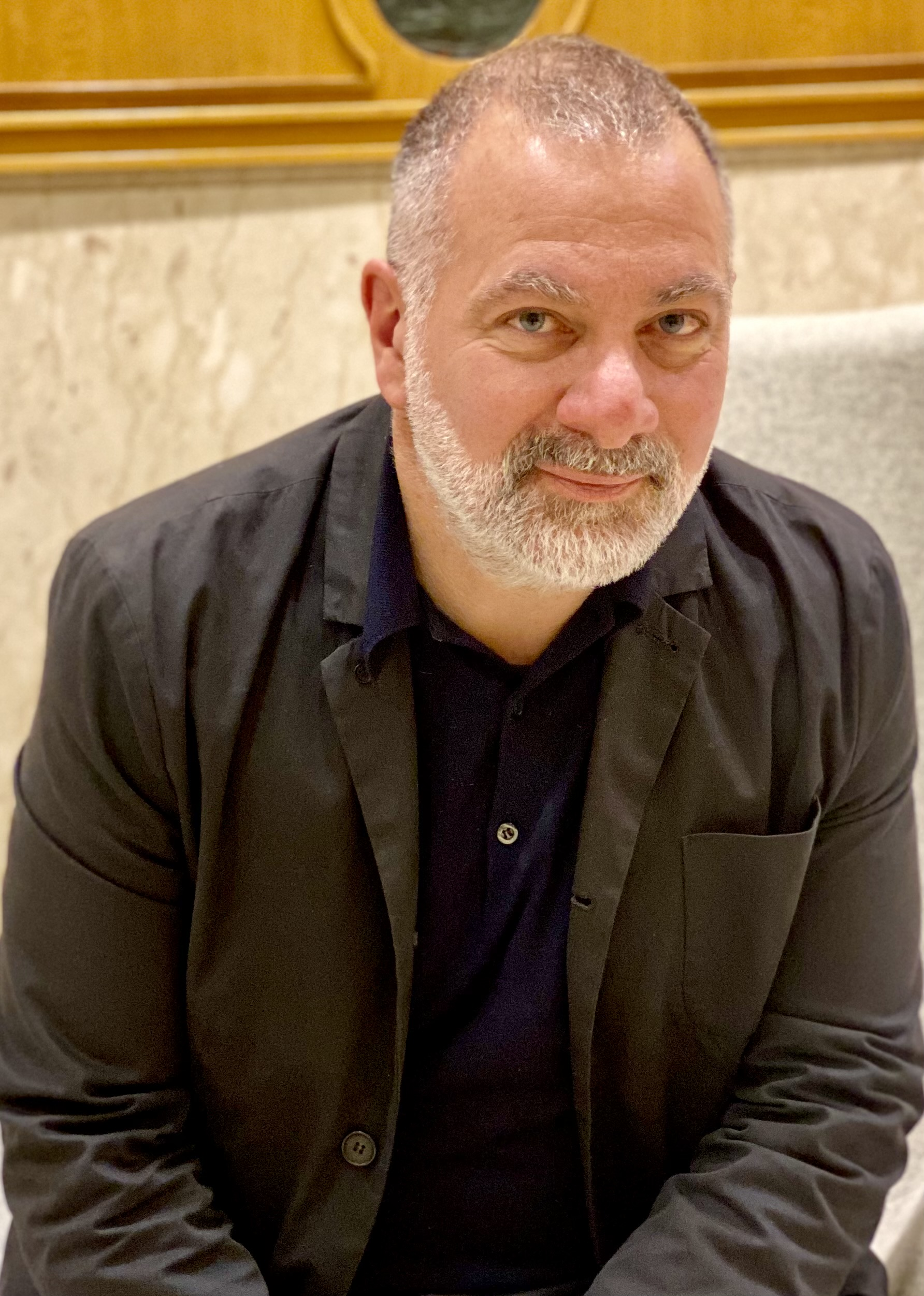
Jed Mercurio was nominated in 2019 for his work in Bodyguard.

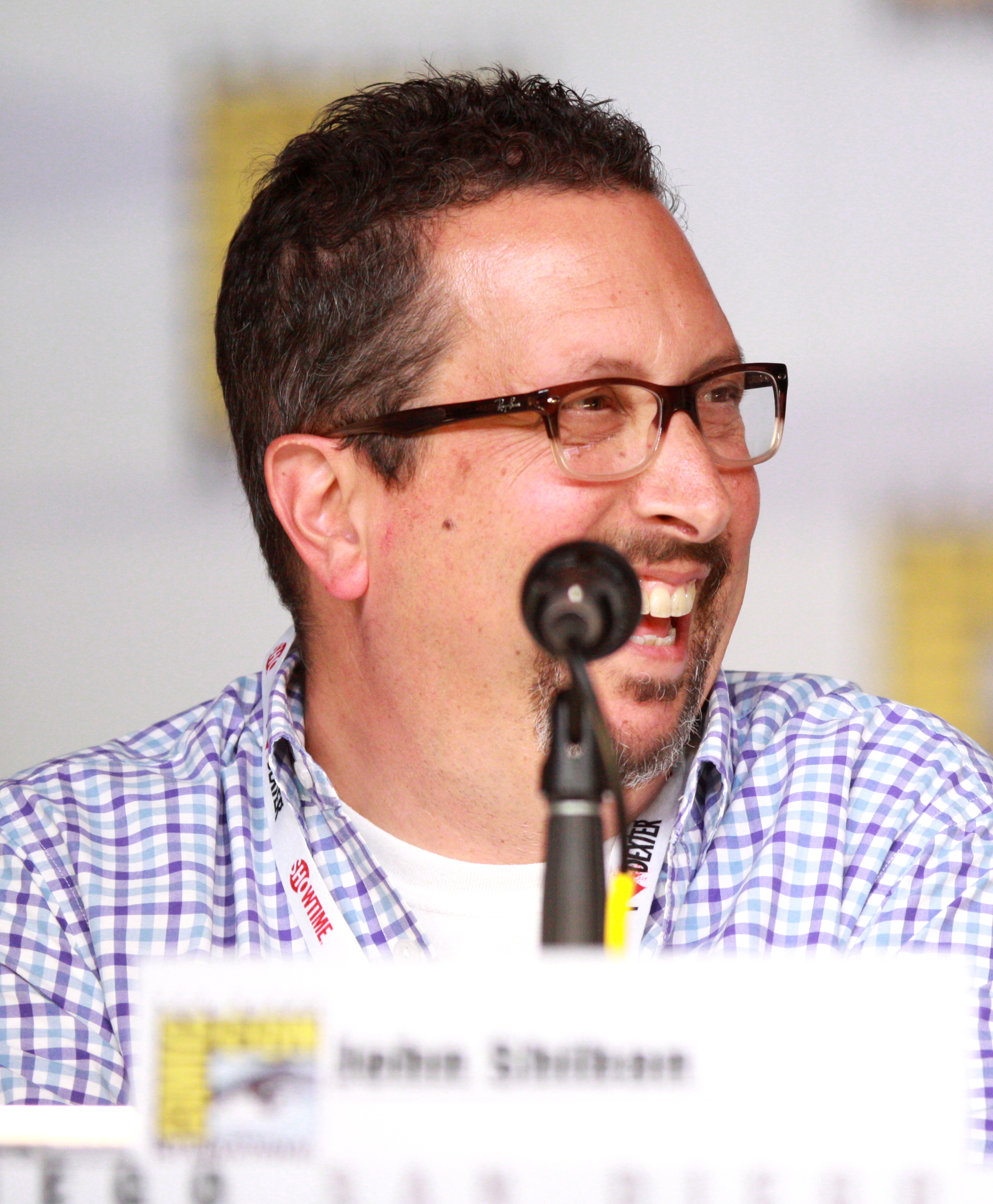
John Shiban received a nomination for writing "Boss Fight" from Ozark's third season.

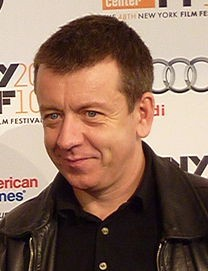
Peter Morgan has been nominated five times, winning in 2021 for The Crown.

Outstanding Writing for a Drama Series
Year	Series	Season	Writer(s)	Result	Ref.
2014	House of Cards	1	Beau Willimon	Nominated	
2017	The Crown	1	Peter Morgan	Nominated	
2017	Stranger Things	1	The Duffer Brothers	Nominated	
2018	Stranger Things	2	The Duffer Brothers	Nominated	
2018	The Crown	2	Peter Morgan	Nominated	
2019	Bodyguard	1	Jed Mercurio	Nominated	
2020	Ozark	3	Miki Johnson	Nominated	
2020	Ozark	3	Chris Mundy	Nominated	
2020	Ozark	3	John Shiban	Nominated	
2020	The Crown	3	Peter Morgan	Nominated	
2021	The Crown	4	Peter Morgan	Won	
2022	Squid Game	1	Hwang Dong-hyuk	Nominated	
2022	Ozark	4	Chris Mundy	Nominated	
2024	The Crown	6	Peter Morgan	Nominated	

=== Cinematography ===
House of Cards won for Outstanding Cinematography for a Single-Camera Series (One Hour) in 2013. The series was also nominated for seasons two, three, and four. In 2017, The Crown, Sense8 and Stranger Things were each nominated for the award. In 2018, Adriano Goldman, from The Crown, won for his work on the episode "Beryl"; Goldman was also nominated in 2017 and 2020. Meanwhile, Ben Kutchins was nominated twice for Ozark in 2018 and 2020.

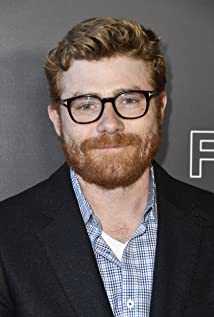
Erik Messerschmidt was nominated in 2020, for his work on the second season of Mindhunter.

Outstanding Cinematography for a Single-Camera Series (One Hour)
Year	Series	Season	Nominee	Result	Ref.
2013	House of Cards	1	Eigil Bryld	Won	
2014	House of Cards	2	Igor Martinovic	Nominated	
2015	House of Cards	3	Martin Ahlgren	Nominated	
2016	House of Cards	4	David M. Dunlap	Nominated	
2017	Sense8	2	John Toll	Nominated	
2017	Stranger Things	1	Tim Ives	Nominated	
2017	The Crown	1	Adriano Goldman	Nominated	
2018	The Crown	2	Adriano Goldman	Won	
2018	Stranger Things	2	Tim Ives	Nominated	
2018	Ozark	2	Ben Kutchins	Nominated	
2020	Ozark	3	Ben Kutchins	Nominated	
2020	Ozark	3	Armando Salas	Nominated	
2020	Mindhunter	2	Erik Messerschmidt	Nominated	
2020	The Crown	3	Adriano Goldman	Nominated	
2021	The Crown	4	Adriano Goldman	Won	
2021	Bridgerton	1	Jeffrey Jur	Nominated	
2021	The Umbrella Academy	2	Neville Kidd	Nominated	
2022	Squid Game	1	Lee Hyung-deok	Nominated	
2022	Ozark	4	Ben Kutchins	Nominated	
2023	The Crown	5	Adriano Goldman	Nominated	
2024	The Crown	6	Adriano Goldman	Nominated	
2024	The Crown	6	Sophia Olsson	Nominated	
2024	3 Body Problem	1	Martin Ahlgreen	Nominated	

=== Picture Editing ===
House of Cards received nominations for seasons one and two. In 2016, Leo Trombetta was nominated for his work in Narcos. Dean Zimmerman won in 2017 for Stranger Things. Meanwhile, Kevin D. Ross was nominated for two consecutive years for episodes "Chapter Seven: The Bathtub" and "Chapter Nine: The Gate". Ozark received three nominations. In 2021, The Crown scored two nominations.

Outstanding Single-Camera Picture Editing for a Drama Series
Year	Series	Season	Nominee(s)	Result	Ref.
2013	House of Cards	1	Kirk Baxter	Nominated	
2014	House of Cards	2	Byron Smith	Nominated	
2016	Narcos	1	Leo Trombetta	Nominated	
2017	Stranger Things	1	Dean Zimmerman	Won	
2017	Stranger Things	1	Kevin D. Ross	Nominated	
2018	Stranger Things	2	Kevin D. Ross	Nominated	
2019	Ozark	2	Cindy Mollo, Heather Goodwin Floyd	Nominated	
2020	Ozark	3	Vikash Patel	Nominated	
2020	Ozark	3	Cindy Mollo	Nominated	
2020	Stranger Things	3	Dean Zimmerman, Katheryn Naranjo	Nominated	
2021	The Crown	4	Yan Miles	Won	
2021	The Crown	4	Paulo Pandolpho	Nominated	
2022	Stranger Things	4	Dean Zimmerman, Casey Cichocki	Nominated	
2022	Squid Game	1	Nam Na-yeong	Nominated	
2024	3 Body Problem	1	Michael Ruscio	Nominated	

=== Casting ===
Outstanding Casting for a Drama Series
Year	Series	Season	Nominee(s)	Result	Ref.
2013	House of Cards	1	Laray Mayfield and Julie Schubert	Won	
2014	House of Cards	2	Laray Mayfield and Julie Schubert	Nominated	
2015	House of Cards	3	Laray Mayfield and Julie Schubert	Nominated	
2015	Orange Is the New Black	2	Jennifer Euston	Nominated	
2016	Orange Is the New Black	3	Jennifer Euston	Nominated	
2017	The Crown	1	Nina Gold and Robert Sterne	Nominated	
2017	Stranger Things	1	Tara Feldstein Bennett, Carmen Cuba, and Chase Paris	Won	
2018	Stranger Things	2	Tara Feldstein Bennett, Carmen Cuba, and Chase Paris	Nominated	
2018	The Crown	2	Nina Gold and Robert Sterne	Won	
2019	Ozark	2	Tara Feldstein Bennett, Alexa L. Fogel, and Chase Paris	Nominated	
2020	Ozark	3	Tara Feldstein Bennett, Alexa L. Fogel, and Chase Paris	Nominated	
2020	The Crown	3	Nina Gold and Robert Sterne	Nominated	
2021	The Crown	4	Robert Sterne	Won	
2021	Bridgerton	1	Kelly Valentine Hendry	Nominated	
2022	Ozark	4	Alexa L. Fogel	Nominated	
2022	Stranger Things	4	Carmen Cuba	Nominated	
2023	The Crown	5	Robert Sterne	Nominated	
2024	The Crown	6	Robert Sterne	Nominated	

== Comedy Series ==
Outstanding Comedy Series
Year	Series	Season	Result	Ref.
2014	Orange Is the New Black	1	Nominated	
2015	Unbreakable Kimmy Schmidt	1	Nominated	
2016	Unbreakable Kimmy Schmidt	2	Nominated	
2017	Unbreakable Kimmy Schmidt	3	Nominated	
2017	Master of None	1	Nominated	
2018	Master of None	2	Nominated	
2018	Unbreakable Kimmy Schmidt	4	Nominated	
2018	GLOW	1	Nominated	
2019	Russian Doll	1	Nominated	
2020	Dead to Me	2	Nominated	
2020	The Kominsky Method	2	Nominated	
2021	The Kominsky Method	3	Nominated	
2021	Cobra Kai	3	Nominated	
2021	Emily in Paris	1	Nominated	
2023	Wednesday	1	Nominated	
2025	Nobody Wants This	1	Nominated	

=== Lead Actor/Actress ===
Outstanding Lead Actor in a Comedy Series
Year	Series	Season	Actor	Result	Ref.
2013	Arrested Development	4	Jason Bateman	Nominated	
2014	Derek	2	Ricky Gervais	Nominated	
2016	Master of None	1	Aziz Ansari	Nominated	
2017	Master of None	2	Aziz Ansari	Nominated	
2019	The Kominsky Method	1	Michael Douglas	Nominated	
2020	The Kominsky Method	2	Michael Douglas	Nominated	
2021	The Kominsky Method	3	Michael Douglas	Nominated	
2025	Nobody Wants This	1	Adam Brody	Nominated	

Outstanding Lead Actress in a Comedy Series
Year	Series	Season	Actress	Result	Ref.
2014	Orange Is the New Black	1	Taylor Schilling	Nominated	
2015	Grace and Frankie	1	Lily Tomlin	Nominated	
2016	Grace and Frankie	2	Lily Tomlin	Nominated	
2016	Unbreakable Kimmy Schmidt	1	Ellie Kemper	Nominated	
2017	Unbreakable Kimmy Schmidt	2	Ellie Kemper	Nominated	
2017	Grace and Frankie	3	Jane Fonda	Nominated	
2017	Grace and Frankie	3	Lily Tomlin	Nominated	
2018	Grace and Frankie	4	Lily Tomlin	Nominated	
2019	Russian Doll	1	Natasha Lyonne	Nominated	
2019	Dead to Me	1	Christina Applegate	Nominated	
2020	Dead to Me	2	Christina Applegate	Nominated	
2020	Dead to Me	2	Linda Cardellini	Nominated	
2023	Dead to Me	3	Christina Applegate	Nominated	
2023	Wednesday	1	Jenna Ortega	Nominated	
2025	Nobody Wants This	1	Kristen Bell	Nominated	
2025	The Residence	1	Uzo Aduba	Nominated	

=== Supporting Actor/Actress ===
Outstanding Supporting Actor in a Comedy Series

In 2015, Tituss Burgess received his first Emmy nomination for his performance on the first season of Unbreakable Kimmy Schmidt. Burgess also received nominations for seasons two, three, and four, for a total of four consecutive nominations. Alan Arkin was nominated for the first and second season of The Kominsky Method, in 2019 and 2020 respectively. In 2021, Paul Reiser received a nomination for his supporting role in the final season of The Kominsky Method.

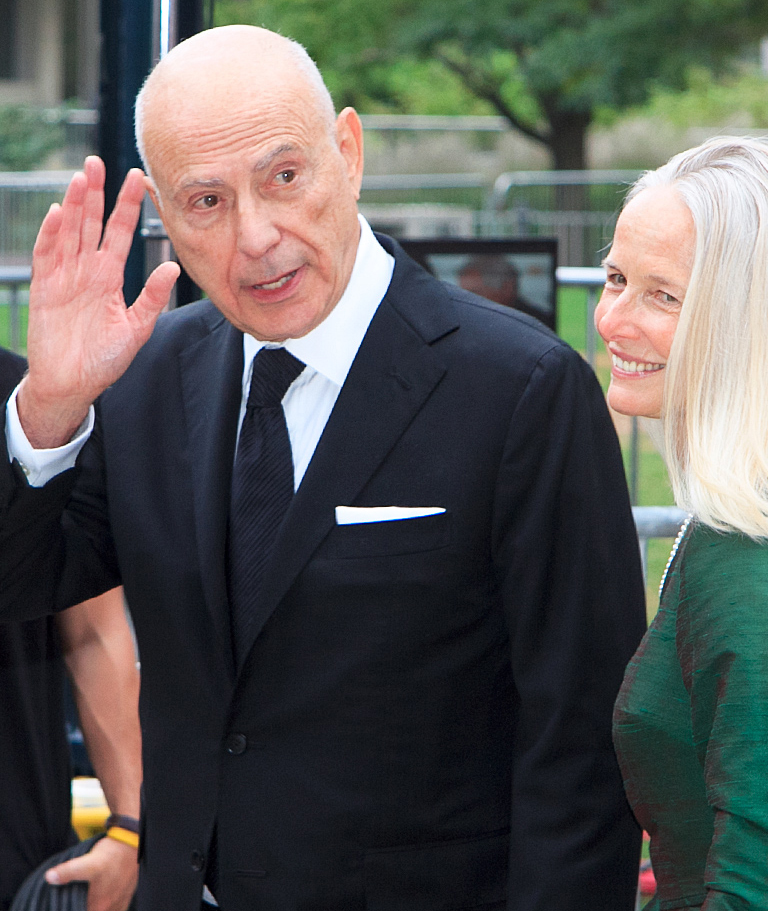
Alik Sakharov received two nominations for The Kominsky Method.

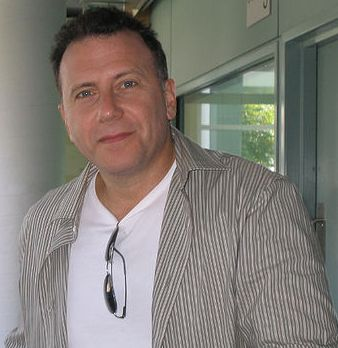
Paul Reiser was nominated during the 73rd Primetime Emmy Awards.

Outstanding Supporting Actor in a Comedy Series
Year	Series	Season	Actor	Result	Ref.
2015	Unbreakable Kimmy Schmidt	1	Tituss Burgess	Nominated	
2016	Unbreakable Kimmy Schmidt	2	Tituss Burgess	Nominated	
2017	Unbreakable Kimmy Schmidt	3	Tituss Burgess	Nominated	
2018	Unbreakable Kimmy Schmidt	4	Tituss Burgess	Nominated	
2019	The Kominsky Method	1	Alan Arkin	Nominated	
2020	The Kominsky Method	2	Alan Arkin	Nominated	
2021	The Kominsky Method	3	Paul Reiser	Nominated	
2025	The Four Seasons	1	Colman Domingo	Nominated	

Outstanding Supporting Actress in a Comedy Series

In 2014, Kate Mulgrew was nominated for her role as Galina "Red" Reznikov in Orange Is the New Black. Jane Krakowski received a nomination for the first season of Unbreakable Kimmy Schmidt. In 2018, Betty Gilpin was nominated for GLOW. In 2019 and 2020, Gilpin was nominated for seasons two and three, respectively.

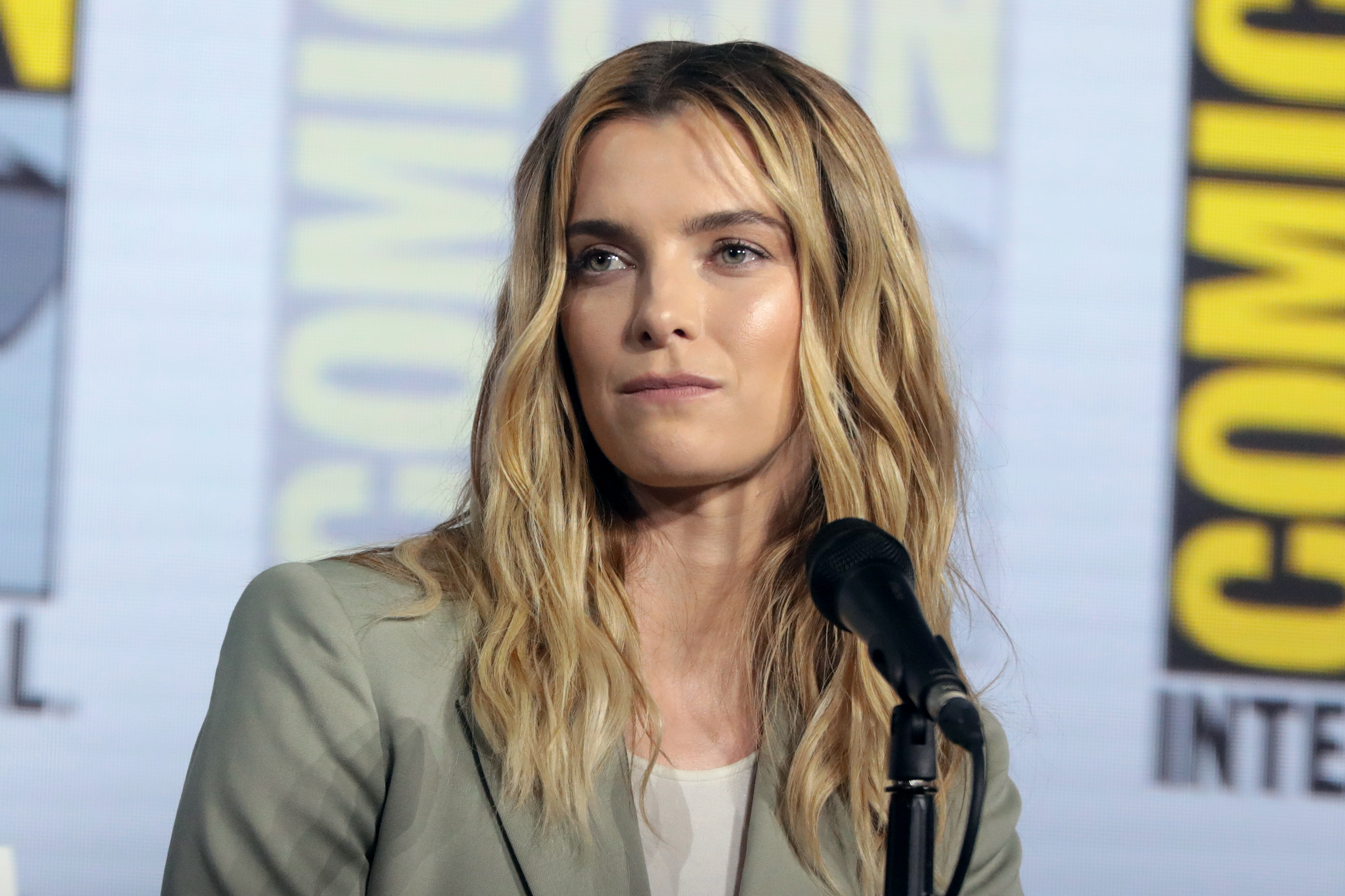
Betty Gilpin was nominated for all three seasons of GLOW.

Outstanding Supporting Actress in a Comedy Series
Year	Series	Season	Actress	Result	Ref.
2014	Orange Is the New Black	1	Kate Mulgrew	Nominated	
2015	Unbreakable Kimmy Schmidt	1	Jane Krakowski	Nominated	
2018	GLOW	1	Betty Gilpin	Nominated	
2019	GLOW	2	Betty Gilpin	Nominated	
2020	GLOW	3	Betty Gilpin	Nominated	

=== Guest Actor/Actress ===
Outstanding Guest Actor in a Comedy Series

In 2015, Jon Hamm was nominated for his performance as Richard Wayne Gary Wayne in Unbreakable Kimmy Schmidt. During the 73rd Primetime Creative Arts Emmy Awards, Morgan Freeman received a nomination for his guest appearance in season three of The Kominsky Method.

Outstanding Guest Actor in a Comedy Series
Year	Series	Season	Actor	Result	Ref.
2015	Unbreakable Kimmy Schmidt	1	Jon Hamm	Nominated	
2021	The Kominsky Method	3	Morgan Freeman	Nominated	

Outstanding Guest Actress in a Comedy Series

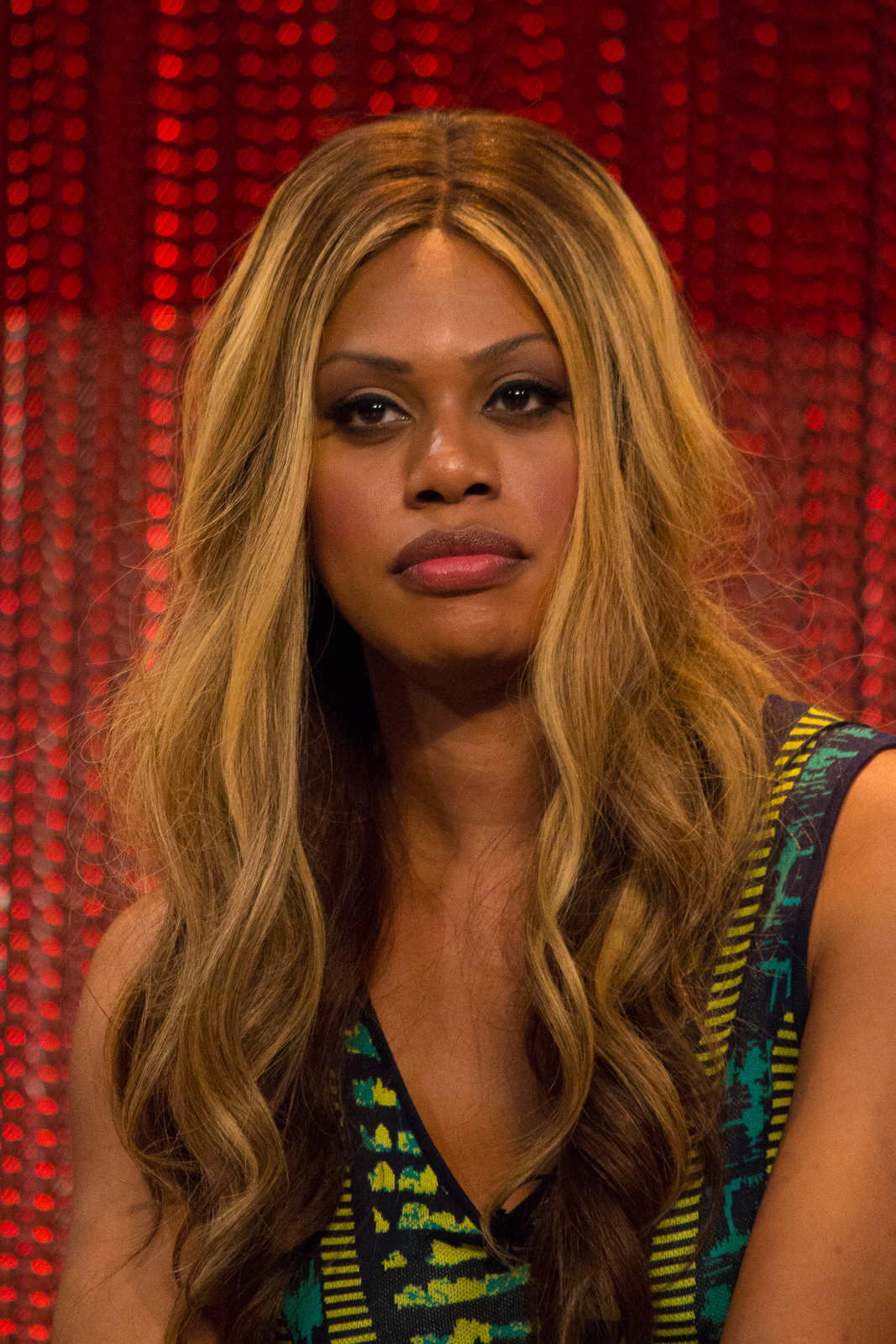
Laverne Cox became the first transgender person to be nominated for acting.

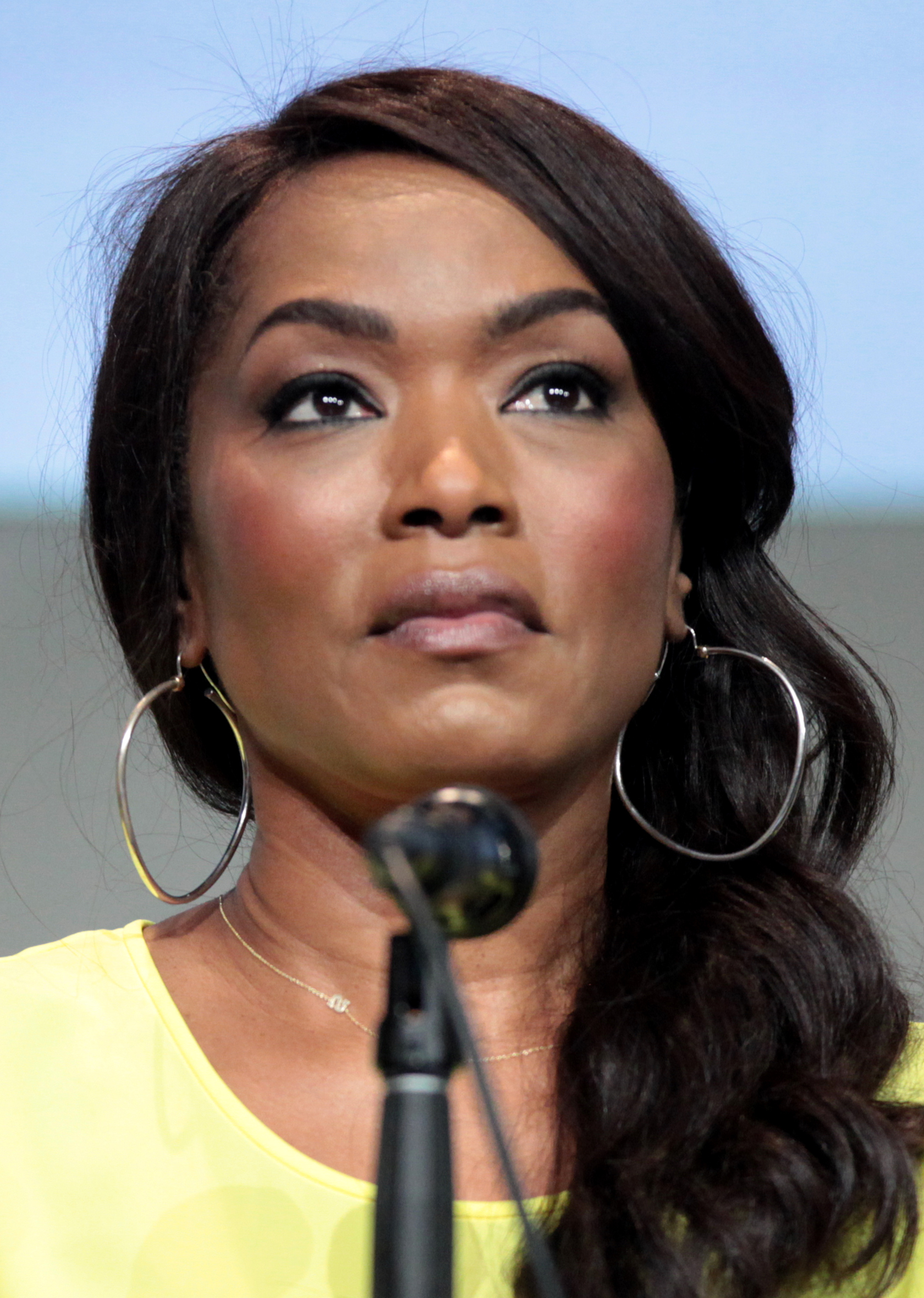
Angela Bassett was nominated for her performance in Master of None.

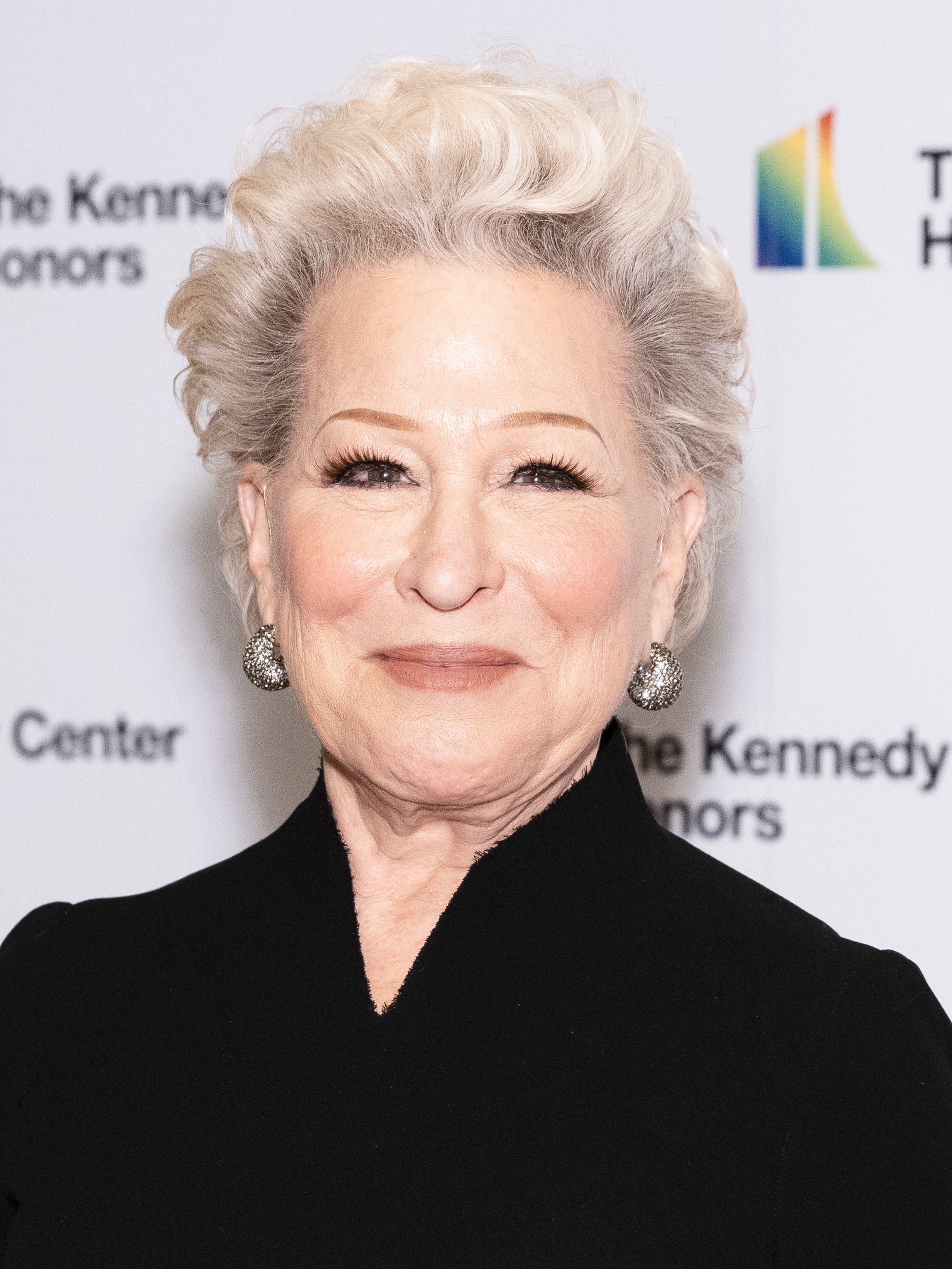
Bette Midler received a nomination for the first season of The Politician.

In 2014, Uzo Aduba, Laverne Cox and Natasha Lyonne were nominated for the first season of Orange Is the New Black, with Aduba winning. Laverne Cox became the first transgender person to be nominated for an Emmy in año acting category. The following year, Tina Fey received a nomination for the debut season of Unbreakable Kimmy Schmidt. Angela Bassett was nominated for Master of None, and Bette Midler for The Politician.

Outstanding Guest Actress in a Comedy Series
Year	Series	Season	Actress	Result	Ref.
2014	Orange Is the New Black	1	Uzo Aduba	Won	
2014	Orange Is the New Black	1	Laverne Cox	Nominated	
2014	Orange Is the New Black	1	Natasha Lyonne	Nominated	
2015	Unbreakable Kimmy Schmidt	1	Tina Fey	Nominated	
2017	Master of None	2	Angela Bassett	Nominated	
2020	The Politician	1	Bette Midler	Nominated	

=== Directing and Writing ===
Outstanding Directing for a Comedy Series

In 2014, Jodie Foster was nominated for directing the episode "Lesbian Request Denied", from Orange Is the New Black. Aziz Ansari was nominated in 2016 for the first season of Master of None. In 2018, Jesse Peretz received a nomination for GLOW. In 2023, Tim Burton received a nomination for Wednesday. In 2024, Guy Ritchie received a nomination for The Gentlemen.

Outstanding Directing for a Comedy Series
Year	Series	Season	Director	Result	Ref.
2014	Orange Is the New Black	1	Jodie Foster	Nominated	
2016	Master of None	1	Aziz Ansari	Nominated	
2018	GLOW	1	Jesse Peretz	Nominated	
2023	Wednesday	1	Tim Burton	Nominated	
2024	The Gentlemen	1	Guy Ritchie	Nominated	

Outstanding Writing for a Comedy Series

In 2014, writers Liz Friedman and Jenji Kohan were nominated for Orange Is the New Black. Aziz Ansari and Alan Yang won for writing "Parents" from Master of None. The following year, Lena Waithe made history when she won in the category becoming the first black female to do so. In 2019, Russian Doll received two nominations for writing. In 2024, Girls5eva scored a nomination.

Outstanding Writing for a Comedy Series
Year	Series	Season	Writer(s)	Result	Ref.
2014	Orange Is the New Black	1	Liz Friedman, Jenji Kohan	Nominated	
2016	Master of None	1	Aziz Ansari, Alan Yang	Won	
2017	Master of None	2	Aziz Ansari, Lena Waithe	Won	
2019	Russian Doll	1	Lyonne, Headland, Poehler	Nominated	
2019	Russian Doll	1	Allison Silverman	Nominated	
2024	Girls5eva	3	Meredith Scardino and Sam Means	Nominated	

=== Cinematography ===
Cinematography for a Multi-Camera Series

The Ranch won the award for seasons one, three, and four, and nominated for season two. Donald A. Morgan is the cinematographer nominated for each season.

Outstanding Cinematography for a Multi-Camera Series
Year	Series	Season	Nominee(s)	Result	Ref.
2017	The Ranch	1	Donald A. Morgan	Won	
2018	The Ranch	2	Donald A. Morgan	Nominated	
2019	The Ranch	3	Donald A. Morgan	Won	
2020	The Ranch	4	Donald A. Morgan	Won	
2020	Family Reunion	1	John Simmons	Nominated	
2021	Country Comfort	1	George Mooradian	Won	
2021	The Upshaws	1	Donald A. Morgan	Nominated	
2024	The Upshaws	3	Chuck Ozeas	Nominated	

Cinematography for a Single-Camera Series (Half-Hour)

In 2018, The End of the F***ing World and GLOW were nominated; the former received a second nomination in 2020. Russian Doll's Chris Teague won for his work on the episode "Ariadne" in 2019.

Outstanding Cinematography for a Single-Camera Series (Half-Hour)
Year	Series	Season	Nominee(s)	Result	Ref.
2018	The End of the F***ing World	1	Justin Brown	Nominated	
2018	GLOW	1	Christian Sprenger	Nominated	
2019	Russian Doll	1	Chris Teague	Won	
2020	The End of the F***ing World	2	Benedict Spence	Nominated	
2022	Russian Doll	2	Ula Pontikos	Nominated	

=== Picture Editing ===
Multi-Camera Picture Editing for a Comedy Series

Outstanding Multi-Camera Picture Editing for a Comedy Series
Year	Series	Episode	Nominee(s)	Result	Ref.
2017	One Day at a Time	"A Snowman's Tale"	Pat Barnett	Nominated	
2018	One Day at a Time	"Not Yet"	Pat Barnett	Nominated	
2019	One Day at a Time	"The Funeral"	Pat Barnett	Won	
2023	The Upshaws	"Duct Up"	Russell Griffin and Angel Gamboa Bryant	Nominated	
2023	The Upshaws	"Off Beat"	Angel Gamboa Bryant	Nominated	
2024	The Upshaws	"Ain't Broke"	Angel Gamboa Bryant and Brian LeCoz	Nominated	
2024	The Upshaws	"Auto Motives"	Angel Gamboa Bryant	Nominated	

Single-Camera Picture Editing for a Comedy Series

Outstanding Single-Camera Picture Editing for a Comedy Series
Year	Series	Episode	Nominee(s)	Result	Ref.
2013	Arrested Development	"Flight of the Phoenix"	Kabir Akhtar & A.J. Dickerson	Nominated	
2014	Orange Is the New Black	"Tit Punch"	William Turro	Won	
2014	Orange Is the New Black	"Can't Fix Crazy"	Michael S. Stern	Nominated	
2014	Orange Is the New Black	"Tall Men With Feelings"	Shannon Mitchell	Nominated	
2017	Master of None	"The Thief"	Jennifer Lilly	Won	
2019	Russian Doll	"Ariadne"	Laura Weinberg	Nominated	

=== Casting ===
Outstanding Casting for a Comedy Series
Year	Series	Casting	Result	Ref.
2014	Orange Is the New Black	Jennifer Euston	Won	
2015	Unbreakable Kimmy Schmidt	Jennifer Euston and Meredith Tucker	Nominated	
2016	Unbreakable Kimmy Schmidt	Cindy Tolan	Nominated	
2017	Master of None	Cody Beke and Teresa Razzauti	Nominated	
2018	GLOW	Elizabeth Barnes and Jennifer Euston	Nominated	
2019	Russian Doll	Christine Kromer	Nominated	
2020	Dead to Me	Sharon Bialy, Russell Scott, and Sherry Thomas	Nominated	
2021	The Kominsky Method	Nikki Valko, Ken Miller and Tara Treacy	Nominated	

== Limited Series/Movie ==
Limited or Anthology series

In 2018, Godless produced by Netflix scored a nomination for Outstanding Limited Series. The following year, When They See Us, also produced by Netflix, received 11 nominations; the series is produced by Robert De Niro, Ava DuVernay, Jonathan King, Jane Rosenthal, Jeff Skoll, Berry Welsh, and Oprah Winfrey. In 2021, The Queen's Gambit won eleven Primetime Emmy Awards, including Outstanding Limited or Anthology Series, becoming the first show on Netflix to win this category. In 2023, Beef received eight wins, including Outstanding Limited or Anthology Series and acting wins for Yeun and Wong. In 2024, Ripley and Baby Reindeer were nominated.

Outstanding Limited or Anthology Series
Year	Series	Genre	Creator(s)	Result	Ref.
2018	Godless	Western drama	Scott Frank	Nominated	
2019	When They See Us	True crime	Ava DuVernay	Nominated	
2020	Unbelievable	True crime	Grant, Waldman, and Chabon	Nominated	
2020	Unorthodox	Drama	Anna Winger and Alexa Karolinski	Nominated	
2021	The Queen's Gambit	period drama	Scott Frank and Allan Scott	Won	
2022	Inventing Anna	Drama	Shonda Rhimes	Nominated	
2023	Dahmer – Monster: The Jeffrey Dahmer Story	True crime	Ryan Murphy	Nominated	
2023	Beef	Comedy drama	Lee Sung Jin	Won	
2024	Ripley	Psychological Thriller	Steven Zaillian	Nominated	
2024	Baby Reindeer	Black comedy	Richard Gadd	Won	
2025	Monsters: The Lyle and Erik Menendez Story	True crime	Ryan Murphy	Nominated	
2025	Adolescence	Crime drama	Mark Herbert	Won	
2025	Black Mirror	Speculative fiction	Charlie Brooker	Nominated	

Television movie

A Very Murray Christmas was nominated for Outstanding Television Movie in 2016. In 2017, Black Mirror won by submitting "San Junipero" as a movie. A year later, the series won again by using the same strategy with the episode "USS Callister". In 2019, the movie Black Mirror: Bandersnatch won the same award, achieving a third consecutive win for a television movie steeamed by Netflix. Outstanding Television Movie

Outstanding Television Movie
Year	Film	Genre	Result	Ref.
2016	A Very Murray Christmas	Christmas musical	Nominated	
2017	Black Mirror: "San Junipero"	Science fiction	Won	
2018	Black Mirror: "USS Callister"	Science fiction	Won	
2019	Black Mirror: Bandersnatch	Interactive film	Won	
2020	American Son	Drama	Nominated	
2020	Dolly Parton's Heartstrings: "These Old Bones"	Dramedy	Nominated	
2020	El Camino: A Breaking Bad Movie	Neo-Western	Nominated	
2020	Unbreakable Kimmy Schmidt: Kimmy vs the Reverend	Interactive special	Nominated	
2021	Christmas on the Square	Musical film	Won	
2024	Scoop	Biographical Film	Nominated	
2024	Unfrosted	Comedy film	Nominated	
2025	Rebel Ridge	Action	Won	
2025	Nonnas	Biographical film	Nominated	

=== Lead Actor/Actress ===
Lead Actor in a Limited Series or Movie

In 2015, Ricky Gervais was nominated for Derek: The Special. Three years later, Jesse Plemons was nominated for Black Mirror: "USS Callister". During the 71st Primetime Emmy Awards, Jharrel Jerome won for his portrayal of Korey Wise in the limited series When They See Us, becoming the first Afro–Latin American to win for an acting category.

Outstanding Lead Actor in a Limited Series or Movie
Year	Series / Film	Character	Actor	Result	Ref.
2015	Derek	Derek Noakes	Ricky Gervais	Nominated	
2018	Black Mirror: "USS Callister"	Captain Robert Daly	Jesse Plemons	Nominated	
2019	When They See Us	Korey Wise	Jharrel Jerome	Won	
2020	Hollywood	Archie Coleman	Jeremy Pope	Nominated	
2021	Halston	Halston	Ewan McGregor	Won	
2023	Dahmer – Monster: The Jeffrey Dahmer Story	Jeffrey Dahmer	Evan Peters	Nominated	
2023	Beef	Danny Cho	Steven Yeun	Won	
2024	Ripley	Tom Ripley	Andrew Scott	Nominated	
2024	Baby Reindeer	Donny Dunn	Richard Gadd	Won	
2025	Monsters: The Lyle and Erik Menendez Story	Erik Menendez	Cooper Koch	Nominated	
2025	Adolescence	Eddie Miller	Stephen Graham	Won	

Lead Actress in a Limited Series or Movie

In 2018, Michelle Dockery was nominated for Godless while Regina King won for her performance in Seven Seconds. The following year, Aunjanue Ellis and Niecy Nash were both nominated for When They See Us. In 2020, Shira Haas and Octavia Spencer were nominated for their roles in Unorthodox and Self Made, respectively.

Outstanding Lead Actress in a Limited Series or Movie
Year	Series / Film	Character	Actress	Result	Ref.
2018	Godless	Alice Fletcher	Michelle Dockery	Nominated	
2018	Seven Seconds	Latrice Butler	Regina King	Won	
2019	When They See Us	Sharonne Salaam	Aunjanue Ellis	Nominated	
2019	When They See Us	Delores Wise	Niecy Nash	Nominated	
2020	Self Made	Madam C. J. Walker	Octavia Spencer	Nominated	
2020	Unorthodox	Esther "Esty" Shapiro	Shira Haas	Nominated	
2021	The Queen's Gambit	Beth Harmon	Anya Taylor-Joy	Nominated	
2022	Maid	Alex Russell	Margaret Qualley	Nominated	
2022	Inventing Anna	Anna Sorokin	Julia Garner	Nominated	
2023	Beef	Amy Lau	Ali Wong	Won	
2024	Griselda	Griselda Blanco	Sofía Vergara	Nominated	
2025	Black Mirror	Amanda	Rashida Jones	Nominated	
2025	Sirens	Devon DeWitt	Meghann Fahy	Nominated	

=== Supporting Actor/Actress ===
Supporting Actor in a Limited Series or Movie

In 2018, Jeff Daniels won Outstanding Supporting Actor in a Limited Series or Movie for his performance in Godless. The following year, Asante Blackk, John Leguizamo, and Michael K. Williams were all nominated for When They See Us. In 2020, Tituss Burgess received a nomination for the special Kimmy vs the Reverend. Dylan McDermott and Jim Parsons were nominated for their roles in the miniseries Hollywood.

Outstanding Supporting Actor in a Limited Series or Movie
Year	Series / Film	Character	Actor	Result	Ref.
2018	Godless	Frank Griffin	Jeff Daniels	Won	
2019	When They See Us	Kevin Richardson	Asante Blackk	Nominated	
2019	When They See Us	Frank Griffin	John Leguizamo	Nominated	
2019	When They See Us	Bobby McCray	Michael K. Williams	Nominated	
2020	Kimmy vs the Reverend	Titus Andromedon	Tituss Burgess	Nominated	
2020	Hollywood	Ernest "Ernie" West	Dylan McDermott	Nominated	
2020	Hollywood	Henry Willson	Jim Parsons	Nominated	
2021	The Queen's Gambit	Benny Watts	Thomas Brodie-Sangster	Nominated	
2023	Dahmer – Monster: The Jeffrey Dahmer Story	Lionel Dahmer	Richard Jenkins	Nominated	
2023	Beef	George Nakai	Joseph Lee	Nominated	
2023	Beef	Paul Cho	Young Mazino	Nominated	
2024	Baby Reindeer	Darrien O'Connor	Tom Goodman-Hill	Nominated	
2025	Monsters: The Lyle and Erik Menendez Story	Jose Menendez	Javier Bardem	Nominated	
2025	Adolescence	Jamie Miller	Owen Cooper	Won	
2025	Adolescence	Detective Inspector Luke Bascombe	Ashley Walters	Nominated	

Supporting Actress in a Limited Series or Movie

In 2018, Merritt Wever won in the category for her role in Godless. Meanwhile, Letitia Wright was nominated for Black Mirror: "Black Museum". In 2019, Marsha Stephanie Blake and Vera Farmiga were both nominated for When They See Us.

Outstanding Supporting Actress in a Limited Series or Movie
Year	Series / Film	Character	Actress	Result	Ref.
2018	Godless	Mary Agnes McNue	Merritt Wever	Won	
2018	Black Mirror: "Black Museum"	Nish	Letitia Wright	Nominated	
2019	When They See Us	Linda McCray	Marsha Stephanie Blake	Nominated	
2019	When They See Us	Elizabeth Lederer	Vera Farmiga	Nominated	
2020	Unbelievable	Det. Grace Rasmussen	Toni Collette	Nominated	
2020	Hollywood	Ellen Kincaid	Holland Taylor	Nominated	
2021	The Queen's Gambit	Jolene	Moses Ingram	Nominated	
2023	Dahmer – Monster: The Jeffrey Dahmer Story	Glenda Cleveland	Niecy Nash-Betts	Won	
2023	Beef	Jordan Forster	Maria Bello	Nominated	
2024	Ripley	Marge Sherwood	Dakota Fanning	Nominated	
2024	Baby Reindeer	Martha Scott	Jessica Gunning	Won	
2024	Baby Reindeer	Teri	Nava Mau	Nominated	
2025	Monsters: The Lyle and Erik Menendez Story	Kitty Menendez	Chloë Sevigny	Nominated	
2025	Adolescence	Briony Ariston	Erin Doherty	Won	
2025	Adolescence	Manda Miller	Christine Tremarco	Nominated	

=== Directing and Writing ===
Directing for a Limited Series, Movie, or Dramatic Special

In 2018, Scott Frank was nominated for his directorial work on the limited series Godless. In 2019, Ava DuVernay was nominated for directing the four episodes of When They See Us. In 2020, Maria Schrader won for directing Unorthodox.

Outstanding Directing for a Limited Series, Movie, or Dramatic Special
Year	Series	Episode	Director	Result	Ref.
2018	Godless		Scott Frank	Nominated	
2019	When They See Us		Ava DuVernay	Nominated	
2020	Unorthodox		Maria Schrader	Won	
2021	The Queen's Gambit		Scott Frank	Won	
2022	Maid	"Sky Blue"	John Wells	Nominated	
2023	Dahmer – Monster: The Jeffrey Dahmer Story	"Silenced"	Paris Barclay	Nominated	
2023	Dahmer – Monster: The Jeffrey Dahmer Story	"Bad Meat"	Carl Franklin	Nominated	
2023	Beef	"The Great Fabricator"	Jake Schreier	Nominated	
2023	Beef	"Figures of Light"	Lee Sung Jin	Won	
2024	Ripley		Steven Zaillian	Won	
2024	Baby Reindeer	"Episode 4"	Weronika Tofilska	Nominated	
2025	Adolescence		Philip Barantini	Won	
2025	Sirens	Exiles	Nicole Kassell	Nominated	

Writing for a Limited Series, Movie, or Dramatic Special

Black Mirror has won the award for writing two consecutive years; the first win was for "San Junipero" (by Charlie Brooker) while the second was for "USS Callister" (by William Bridges and Brooker). In 2018, Scott Frank was nominated for writing Godless, and Kevin McManus and Michael McManus were nominated for American Vandal. The following year, When They See Us was nominated for the episode "Part Four", written by Ava DuVernay and Michael Starrbury. In 2020, Michael Chabon, Susannah Grant and Ayelet Waldman were nominated for "Episode 1" of Unbelievable while Anna Winger received a nomination for "Part 1" of Unorthodox.

Outstanding Writing for a Limited Series, Movie, or Dramatic Special
Year	Series	Episode	Writer(s)	Result	Ref.
2017	Black Mirror	"San Junipero"	Charlie Brooker	Won	
2018	Black Mirror	"USS Callister"	William Bridges and Charlie Brooker	Won	
2018	Godless		Scott Frank	Nominated	
2018	American Vandal	"Clear Up"	Kevin McManus, Michael McManus	Nominated	
2019	When They See Us	"Part 4"	Ava DuVernay, Michael Starrbury	Nominated	
2020	Unbelievable	"Episode 1"	Chabon, Grant, and Waldman	Nominated	
2020	Unorthodox	"Part 1"	Anna Winger	Nominated	
2021	The Queen's Gambit		Scott Frank	Nominated	
2022	Maid	"Snaps"	Molly Smith Metzler	Nominated	
2023	Beef	"The Birds Don't Sing, They Screech in Pain"	Lee Sung Jin	Won	
2024	Black Mirror	"Joan is Awful"	Charlie Brooker	Nominated	
2024	Ripley		Steven Zaillian	Nominated	
2024	Baby Reindeer		Richard Gadd	Won	
2025	Adolescence		Stephen Graham and Jack Thorne	Won	
2025	Black Mirror	Common People	Charlie Brooker and Bisha K. Ali	Nominated	

=== Cinematography ===
Outstanding Cinematography for a Limited or Anthology Series or Movie
Year	Series	Episode	Nominee(s)	Result	Ref.
2017	Black Mirror	"Nosedive"	Seamus McGarvey	Nominated	
2018	Black Mirror	"USS Callister"	Stephan Pehrsson	Nominated	
2018	Godless	"An Incident at Creede"	Steven Meizler	Nominated	
2019	When They See Us	"Part 1"	Bradford Young	Nominated	
2021	The Queen's Gambit	"End Game"	Steven Meizler	Won	
2023	Guillermo del Toro's Cabinet of Curiosities	"The Autopsy"	Anastas Michos	Nominated	
2024	Ripley	"V Lucio"	Robert Elswit	Won	

=== Picture Editing ===
Outstanding Single-Camera Picture Editing for a Limited or Anthology Series or Movie
Year	Series	Episode	Nominee(s)	Result	Ref.
2018	Black Mirror	"USS Callister"	Selina MacArthur	Won	
2020	El Camino: A Breaking Bad Movie		Skip Macdonald	Nominated	
2021	The Queen's Gambit	"Exchanges"	Michelle Tesoro	Won	
2023	Dahmer – Monster: The Jeffrey Dahmer Story	"The Good Boy Box"	Stephanie Filo	Nominated	
2023	Beef	"Figures of Light"	Nat Fuller and Laura Zempel	Won	
2024	Ripley	"III Sommerso"	Joshua Raymond Lee and David O. Rogers	Nominated	
2024	Baby Reindeer	"Episode 4"	Peter H. Oliver and Benjamin Gerstein	Won	
2025	Monsters: The Lyle and Erik Menendez Story	"Blame It on the Rain"	Peggy Tachdjian	Won	
2025	Sirens	"Exile"	Catherine Haight	Nominated	

=== Casting ===
Outstanding Casting for a Limited Series, Movie, or Special
Year	Series	Casting	Result	Ref.
2018	Godless	Ellen Lewis, Rene Haynes, Jo Edna Boldin	Nominated	
2019	When They See Us	Aisha Coley, Billy Hopkins, Ashley Ingram	Won	
2020	Unbelievable	Rosenthal, Angstreich, Caldwell, Kostenbauder	Nominated	
2020	Unorthodox	Esther Kling, Vicki Thomson, Maria Rölcke, Cornelia Mareth	Nominated	
2021	The Queen's Gambit	Various: Ellen Lewis, Kate Sprance, Olivia Scott-Webb, Tina Gerussi, Anna-Lena Slater, Tatjana Moutchnik, and Stephanie Maile	Won	
2023	Dahmer – Monster: The Jeffrey Dahmer Story	Robert J. Ulrich, Eric Dawson and Carol Kritzer	Nominated	
2023	Beef	Charlene Lee and Claire Koonce	Won	
2024	Ripley	Avy Kaufman, Francesco Vedovati, and Barbari Giordani	Nominated	
2024	Baby Reindeer	Nina Gold and Martin Ware	Won	

== Short Form ==
Short Form Comedy or Drama Series

In 2019, It's Bruno!, produced by Amanda Bowers, Molly Conners, Vincent Morano and Solvan "Slick" Naim, was nominated. Special was also nominated that year; the series is produced by Anna Dokoza, Eric Norsoph, Ryan O'Connell, Jim Parsons, and Todd Spiewak.

Outstanding Short Form Comedy or Drama Series
Year	Series	Genre	Creator(s)	Result	Ref.
2019	It's Bruno!	Comedy	Solvan Naim	Nominated	
2019	Special	Dramedy	Ryan O'Connell	Nominated	
2022	I Think You Should Leave with Tim Robinson	Sketch Comedy	Tim Robinson and Zach Kanin	Nominated	
2023	I Think You Should Leave with Tim Robinson	Sketch Comedy	Tim Robinson and Zach Kanin	Won	

Actor in a Short Form Comedy or Drama Series

In 2019, sixth-place finisher Ryan O'Connell became the fifth nominee in the category after Jonathan Banks' nomination was revoked. It was determined that several episodes were shorter than two minutes, violating the Academy of Television Arts & Sciences' rule that six episodes air during the eligibility period with a runtime of at least two minutes.

Outstanding Actor in a Short Form Comedy or Drama Series
Year	Series	Character	Actor	Result	Ref.
2019	Special	Ryan Hayes	Ryan O'Connell	Nominated	
2021	Bonding	Peter "Pete" Devin	Brendan Scannell	Nominated	
2022	I Think You Should Leave with Tim Robinson	Various Characters	Tim Robinson	Won	
2023	I Think You Should Leave with Tim Robinson	Various Characters	Tim Robinson	Won	

Actress in a Short Form Comedy or Drama Series

In 2019, Special scored two nominations in the category with actresses Jessica Hecht and Punam Patel, for the first season of the series.

Outstanding Actress in a Short Form Comedy or Drama Series
Year	Series	Character	Actress	Result	Ref.
2019	Special	Karen Hayes	Jessica Hecht	Nominated	
2019	Special	Kim Laghari	Punam Patel	Nominated	

== Nonfiction ==
=== Documentary Series/Special ===
In 2016, Laura Ricciardi and Moira Demos won for the documentary series Making a Murderer. Chef's Table has been nominated three times without winning. During the 70th Primetime Creative Arts Emmy Awards, Wild Wild Country became the second Netflix's production in win the award. The following year, Our Planet, won the third award in the category. In 2020, Tiger King: Murder, Mayhem And Madness was nominated.

Outstanding Documentary or Nonfiction Series
Year	Series	Genre	Creator(s)	Result	Ref.
2016	Making a Murderer	True crime	Laura Ricciardi and Moira Demos	Won	
2016	Chef's Table	Reality television	David Gelb	Nominated	
2017	Chef's Table	Reality television	David Gelb	Nominated	
2018	Wild Wild Country	True crime	Maclain Way and Chapman Way	Won	
2019	Our Planet	Nature documentary	Lanfear, Fothergill, and Scholey	Won	
2019	Chef's Table	Reality television	David Gelb	Nominated	
2020	Tiger King	True crime	Eric Goode and Rebecca Chaiklin	Nominated	
2021	Pretend It's a City	Biography	Martin Scorsese	Nominated	
2022	Jeen-Yuhs	Biography	Coodie Simmons	Nominated	
2022	The Andy Warhol Diaries	Biography	Ryan Murphy	Nominated	
2024	Beckham	Television documentary	David Gardner	Won	

Documentary or Nonfiction Special

In 2014, The Square was nominated for Outstanding Documentary or Nonfiction Special. The following year, Virunga, received a nomination in the category. In 2016, What Happened, Miss Simone? became the first Netflix's original to win in this category. During the 2017, 13th won.

Outstanding Documentary or Nonfiction Special
Year	Special	Producers	Result	Ref.
2014	The Square	Various: Jodie Evans, Lekha Singh, Sarah E. Johnson, Mike Lerner, Gavin Dougan, Karim Amer and Jehane Noujaim	Nominated	
2015	Virunga	Various: Leonardo DiCaprio, Howard G. Buffett, Maxyne Franklin, Jess Search, Jon Drever, Orlando von Einsiedel, and Joanna Natasegara	Nominated	
2016	What Happened, Miss Simone?	Sidney Beaumont, Amy Hobby, Liz Garbus, Justin Wilkes, and Jayson Jackson	Won	
2017	13th	Angus Wall, Jason Sterman, Spencer Averick, Ava DuVernay, and Howard Barish	Won	
2017	Amanda Knox	Mette Heide, Rod Blackhurst, Brian McGinn, and Stephen Robert Morse	Nominated	
2018	Icarus	Bryan Fogel, Dan Cogan, David Fialkow and Jim Swartz	Nominated	
2018	Jim & Andy: The Great Beyond	Various: Shane Smith, Eddy Moretti, Nicole Montez, Tony Clifton, Spike Jonze, Danny Gabai, and Chris Smith	Nominated	
2019	Fyre	Danny Gabai, Chris Smith, Mick Purzycki, and Gabrielle Bluestone	Nominated	
2020	Becoming	Lauren Cioffi, Katy Chevigny, Marilyn Ness, Priya Swaminathan, and Tonia Davis	Nominated	
2020	The Great Hack	Various: Judy Korin, Pedro Kos, Karim Amer, Geralyn White Dreyfous, produced by; Nina Fialkow, Lyn Davis Lear and Mike Lerner	Nominated	
2021	The Social Dilemma	Larissa Rhodes, Daniel Wright, and Stacey Piculell	Nominated	
2022	The Tinder Swindler	Bart Layton, Sam Starbuck, Jeff Gaspin, Eric Levy, Stuart Ford and Lourdes Diaz	Nominated	
2023	Pamela, a Love Story	Jessica Hargrave, Ryan White, Julia Nottingham and Brandon Thomas Lee	Nominated	
2024	The Greatest Night in Pop	Larry Klein, Harriet Sternberg, Lionel Richie, Bruce Eskowitz and George Hencken	Nominated	

=== Hosted Series ===
My Next Guest Needs No Introduction with David Letterman received an Emmy nomination for its first season in 2018. After Netflix acquired Comedians in Cars Getting Coffee, the web series was nominated for its season 10 and 11. In 2020, Ugly Delicious, received a nomination.

Outstanding Hosted Nonfiction Series or Special
Year	Series	Genre	Host	Result	Ref.
2018	My Next Guest Needs No Introduction	Talk show	David Letterman	Nominated	
2019	My Next Guest Needs No Introduction	Talk show	David Letterman	Nominated	
2019	Comedians in Cars Getting Coffee	Talk show / Comedy	Jerry Seinfeld	Nominated	
2020	Comedians in Cars Getting Coffee	Talk show / Comedy	Jerry Seinfeld	Nominated	
2020	Ugly Delicious	Documentary	David Chang	Nominated	
2021	My Next Guest Needs No Introduction	Talk show	David Letterman	Nominated	
2022	My Next Guest Needs No Introduction	Talk show	David Letterman	Nominated	
2023	My Next Guest Needs No Introduction	Talk show	David Letterman	Nominated	
2024	My Next Guest Needs No Introduction	Talk show	David Letterman	Won	

=== Reality Program ===
Structured Reality Program

Queer Eye has won the award six consecutive years, from 2018 to 2023. Tidying Up with Marie Kondo and Love Is Blind received nominations in 2019 and 2020, respectively.

Outstanding Structured Reality Program
Year	Series	Host(s)	Creator(s)	Result	Ref.
2018	Queer Eye	Antoni Porowski, Tan France, Karamo Brown, Bobby Berk, and Jonathan Van Ness	David Collins	Won	
2019	Queer Eye	Antoni Porowski, Tan France, Karamo Brown, Bobby Berk, and Jonathan Van Ness	David Collins	Won	
2019	Tidying Up with Marie Kondo	Marie Kondo		Nominated	
2020	Love Is Blind	Nick Lachey and Vanessa Lachey	Various: Chris Coelen, Sam Dean, Ally Simpson, Eric Detwiler, and Terrance Villarreal	Nominated	
2020	Queer Eye	Antoni Porowski, Tan France, Karamo Brown, Bobby Berk, and Jonathan Van Ness	David Collins	Won	
2021	Queer Eye	Antoni Porowski, Tan France, Karamo Brown, Bobby Berk, and Jonathan Van Ness	David Collins	Won	
2022	Queer Eye	Antoni Porowski, Tan France, Karamo Brown, Bobby Berk, and Jonathan Van Ness	David Collins	Won	
2022	Love Is Blind	Nick Lachey and Vanessa Lachey	Various: Chris Coelen, Sam Dean, Ally Simpson, Eric Detwiler, and Terrance Villarreal	Nominated	
2023	Queer Eye	Antoni Porowski, Tan France, Karamo Brown, Bobby Berk, and Jonathan Van Ness	David Collins	Won	
2023	Love Is Blind	Nick Lachey and Vanessa Lachey	Various: Chris Coelen, Sam Dean, Ally Simpson, Eric Detwiler, and Terrance Villarreal	Nominated	
2024	Queer Eye	Antoni Porowski, Tan France, Karamo Brown and Jonathan Van Ness	David Collins	Nominated	
2024	Love Is Blind	Nick Lachey and Vanessa Lachey	Various: Chris Coelen, Sam Dean, Ally Simpson, Eric Detwiler, and Terrance Villarreal	Nominated	

Unstructured Reality Program

In 2019, Somebody Feed Phil was nominated. During the 2020 ceremony, Kevin Hart: Don't F**k This Up received a nomination and Cheer won the first Emmy for Netflix in the category. Cheer was produced by Greg Whiteley, Andrew Fried, Dane Lillegard, Jasper Thomlinson, Bert Hamelinck, Adam Leibowitz, Arielle Kilker and Chelsea Yarnell.

Outstanding Unstructured Reality Program
Year	Series	Producer(s)	Result	Ref.
2019	Somebody Feed Phil	Various: Rich Rosenthal, John Bedolis, Phil Rosenthal, Christopher Collins, Lydia Tenaglia, Joe Caterini and Shawn Cuddy	Nominated	
2020	Cheer	Various: Greg Whiteley, Andrew Fried, Dane Lillegard, Jasper Thomlinson, Bert Hamelinck, Adam Leibowitz, Arielle Kilker, and Chelsea Yarnell	Won	
2020	Kevin Hart: Don't F**k This Up	Various: Kevin Hart, Dave Becky, Angus Wall, Russell Heldt, Casey Kriley and Alexandra Marks, Rich Eckersley, Allison Klein, Kent Kubena, Terry Leonard and Jennifer Sofio Hall	Nominated	
2021	Indian Matchmaking	Eli Holzman, Aaron Saidman, J.C. Begley, Smriti Mundhra, and Hoo In Kim	Nominated	
2021	Selling Sunset	Adam DiVello, Kristofer Lindquist, Kimberly Goodman, Skyler Wakil and Sundee Manusakis	Nominated	
2022	Cheer	Greg Whiteley	Nominated	
2022	Selling Sunset	Adam DiVello, Kristofer Lindquist, Kimberly Goodman, Skyler Wakil and Sundee Manusakis	Nominated	
2022	Love on the Spectrum	Cian O’Clery and Karina Holden	Won	
2023	Indian Matchmaking	Eli Holzman, Aaron Saidman, J.C. Begley, Smriti Mundhra, and Hoo In Kim	Nominated	
2023	Selling Sunset	Adam DiVello, Kristofer Lindquist, Kimberly Goodman, Skyler Wakil and Sundee Manusakis	Nominated	
2024	Love on the Spectrum	Cian O’Clery and Karina Holden	Nominated	

Competition Program

Nailed It! was nominated in 2019, 2020 and 2021. It has been the only Netflix's original to be nominated for Outstanding Competition Program

Outstanding Competition Program
Year	Series	Producer(s)	Result	Ref.
2019	Nailed It!	Various: Dan Cutforth, Jane Lipsitz, Daniel Calin, Gaylen Gawlowski, Casey Kriley, Patrick J. Doody, Jo Sharon, and Laura Slobin	Nominated	
2020	Nailed It!	Various: Patrick J. Doody, Gaylen Gawlowski, Casey Kriley, Jo Sharon, Sandra Birdsong, Anika Guldstrand and Cat Sullivan	Nominated	
2021	Nailed It!	Various: Casey Kriley, Jo Sharon, Patrick Doody, Shea Spencer, Nicole Byer, Anika Guldstrand, Hillary Olsen, Cat M. Sullivan, and Samantha Hanks	Nominated	
2022	Nailed It!	Various: Casey Kriley, Jo Sharon, Patrick Doody, Shea Spencer, Nicole Byer, Anika Guldstrand, Hillary Olsen, Cat M. Sullivan, and Samantha Hanks	Nominated	

=== Directing and Writing ===
Directing for a Documentary/Nonfiction Program

In 2014, Jehane Noujaim won for Outstanding Directing for a Documentary/Nonfiction Program for The Square. Moira Demos and Laura Ricciardi won an Emmy for directing the episode "Fighting for Their Lives" from Making a Murderer. David Gelb received a nomination for Chef's Table. What Happened, Miss Simone?'s director, Liz Garbus, was nominated in 2016. Ava DuVernay was nominated for her work on the documentary film, 13th. In 2018, Bryan Fogel scored an Emmy nomination for Icarus, and Chapman Way and Maclain Way for Wild Wild Country. During the 72nd Primetime Emmy Awards, Steven Bognar and Julia Reichert won for American Factory.

Outstanding Directing for a Documentary/Nonfiction Program
Year	Program	Episode	Director(s)	Result	Ref.
2014	The Square		Jehane Noujaim	Won	
2016	Making a Murderer	"Fighting for Their Lives"	Moira Demos and Laura Ricciardi	Won	
2016	Chef's Table	"Gaggan Anand"	David Gelb	Nominated	
2016	What Happened, Miss Simone?		Liz Garbus	Nominated	
2017	13th		Ava DuVernay	Nominated	
2018	Icarus		Bryan Fogel	Nominated	
2018	Wild Wild Country	"Part 3"	Chapman Way, Maclain Way	Nominated	
2019	Fyre		Chris Smith	Nominated	
2020	American Factory		Steven Bognar and Julia Reichert	Won	
2020	Becoming		Nadia Hallgren	Nominated	
2020	Tiger King	"Cult of Personality"	Eric Goode and Rebecca Chaiklin	Nominated	
2021	The Social Dilemma		Jeff Orlowski	Nominated	
2021	Dick Johnson Is Dead		Kirsten Johnson	Won	
2022	The Andy Warhol Diaries	"Shadows: Andy & Jed"	Andrew Rossi	Nominated	
2024	Beckham	"What Makes David Run"	Fisher Stevens	Nominated	
2024	The Greatest Night in Pop		Bao Nguyen	Nominated	

Directing for a Reality Program

In 2019, Hisham Abed won for directing the episode "Black Girl Magic", from Queer Eye. the following year, Abed scored another nomination for Queer Eye. Greg Whiteley won an Emmy for directing Cheer.

Outstanding Directing for a Reality Program
Year	Program	Director	Episode	Result	Ref.
71st Primetime Creative Arts Emmy Awards2019	Queer Eye	"Black Girl Magic"	Hisham Abed	Won	
2020	Queer Eye	"Mega City Block"	Hisham Abed	Nominated	
2020	Cheer	"Daytona"	Greg Whiteley	Won	
2021	Queer Eye	"Preaching Out Loud"	Mark Perez	Nominated	
2022	Cheer	"Daytona Pt.2: If the Judges Disagree"	Greg Whiteley	Nominated	
2022	Queer Eye	"Angels Gets Her Wings"	Aaron Krummel	Nominated	
2023	Queer Eye	"Speedy for Life"	Ali Moghadas	Nominated	
2024	Love on the Spectrum	"Episode 7"	Cian O’Clery	Won	
2024	Squid Game: The Challenge	"Red Light, Green Light"	Diccon Ramsay	Nominated	

Writing for a Nonfiction Programming

In 2016, Making a Murderer won for Outstanding Writing for a Nonfiction Programming for its first season. 13th, written by Ava DuVernay and Spencer Averick, won in 2017; Amanda Knox and Bill Nye Saves the World were also nominated. The following year, Icarus scored a nomination while the series Our Planet was nominated in 2019. In 2020, Don't F**k with Cats: Hunting an Internet Killer won; Circus of Books was also nominated.

Outstanding Writing for a Nonfiction Programming
Year	Program	Episode	Writer(s)	Result	Ref.
2016	Making a Murderer	"Eighteen Years Lost"	Moira Demos, Laura Ricciardi	Won	
2017	13th		Spencer Averick, Ava DuVernay	Won	
2017	Amanda Knox		Matthew Hamachek, Brian McGinn	Nominated	
2017	Bill Nye Saves the World	"The Sexual Spectrum"	Various: Mike Drucker; CeCe Pleasants; Sanden Totten; Mike Drucker; Flora Lichtman; Prashanth Venkataramanujam	Nominated	
2018	Icarus		Jon Bertain, Bryan Fogel, Mark Monroe	Nominated	
2019	Our Planet	"Jungles"	Various: David Attenborough, Huw Cordey; Alastair Fothergill; Keith Scholey	Nominated	
2020	Circus of Books		Rachel Mason, Kathryn Robson	Nominated	
2020	Don't F**k with Cats: Hunting an Internet Killer		Mark Lewis	Won	
2021	The Social Dilemma		Vickie Curtis, Davis Coombe, Jeff Orlowski	Won	
2022	The Andy Warhol Diaries	"Shadows: Andy & Jed"	Andrew Rossi	Nominated	
2022	The Tinder Swindler		Felicity Morris	Nominated	

=== Cinematography ===
Outstanding Cinematography for a Nonfiction Program
Year	Program	Episode	Nominee(s)	Result	Ref.
2014	The Square		Various: Muhammad Hamdy; Ahmed Hassan; Jehane Noujaim; Cressida Trew	Won	
2015	Virunga		Franklin Dow	Won	
2016	What Happened, Miss Simone?		Igor Martinovic, Rachel Morrison	Nominated	
2017	13th		Hans Charles, Kira Kelly	Nominated	
2017	Chef's Table	"Virgilio Martinez"	Will Basanta	Nominated	
2018	Chef's Table	"Corrado Assenza"	Adam Bricker	Nominated	
2019	Our Planet	"Coastal Seas"	Doug Anderson, Gavin Thurston	Nominated	
2019	Our Planet	"Jungles"	Matt Aeberhard, Alastair MacEwen	Nominated	
2019	Our Planet	"One Planet"	Roger Horrocks, Jamie McPherson	Nominated	
2020	American Factory		Aubrey Keith and Erick Stoll	Nominated	
2020	Becoming		Nadia Hallgren	Nominated	
2021	David Attenborough: A Life on Our Planet		Gavin Thurston	Won	
2021	Dick Johnson Is Dead		Kirsten Johnson and John Wakayama Carey	Nominated	
2021	The Social Dilemma		John Behrens and Jonathan Pope	Nominated	
2022	The Andy Warhol Diaries	"Collab: Andy & Basquiat"	Wolfgang Held	Nominated	
2022	Our Great National Parks	"Chilean Patagonia"	Christiaan Muñoz-Salas and Ignacio Walker	Nominated	
2024	Beckham	"Chilean Patagonia"	Tim Cragg	Nominated	
2024	Our Planet	"Chapter 1: World on the Move"	Brad Bestelink and Kyle McBurnie	Nominated	

Cinematography for a Reality Program

Queer Eye was nominated for seasons one, two, and the special We're in Japan!: Japanese Holiday. Garrett Rosey was the cinematographer nominated.

Outstanding Cinematography for a Reality Program
Year	Program	Episode	Nominee(s)	Result	Ref.
2018	Queer Eye	"To Gay or Not Too Gay"	Garrett Rosey	Nominated	
2019	Queer Eye	"God Bless Gay"	Garrett Rosey	Nominated	
2020	Queer Eye	"We're in Japan!: Japanese Holiday"	Garrett Rosey	Nominated	
2020	Cheer	"Hit Zero"	Melissa Langer, Erynn Patrick	Nominated	
2021	Queer Eye	"Groomer Has It"	Garrett Rosey	Nominated	

=== Picture Editing ===
Picture Editing for a Nonfiction Program

Outstanding Picture Editing for a Nonfiction Program
Year	Program	Episode	Nominee(s)	Result	Ref.
2014	The Square		Various: Pedro Kos, Christopher de la Torre, Mohamed El Manasterly	Nominated	
2016	Making a Murderer	"Indefensible"	Moira Demos	Won	
2016	What Happened, Miss Simone?		Joshua L. Pearson	Nominated	
2017	13th		Spencer Averick	Nominated	
2018	Wild Wild Country	"Part 3"	Neil Meiklejohn	Nominated	
2020	American Factory		Lindsay Utz	Nominated	
2020	Tiger King	"Cult of Personality"	Various: Doug Abel, Nicholas Biagetti, Dylan Hansen-Fliedner, Geoffrey Richman, and Daniel Koehler	Nominated	
2021	The Social Dilemma		Davis Coombe	Won	
2021	David Attenborough: A Life on Our Planet		Martin Elsbury and Charles Dyer	Nominated	
2022	The Tinder Swindler		Julian Hart	Nominated	
2024	Beckham	"Golden Balls"	Michael Harte, Paul Carlin and Chris King	Nominated	
2024	Escaping Twin Flames	"Up in Flames"	Various: Martin Biehn, Kevin Hibbard, Troy Takaki, Mimi Wilcox and Inbal B. Lessner	Nominated	

Picture Editing for a Structured Reality or Competition Program

Outstanding Picture Editing for a Structured Reality or Competition Program
Year	Program	Episode	Nominee(s)	Result	Ref.
2018	Queer Eye	-	Various: Thomas Scott Reuther, Joe DeShano, A.M. Peters, Nova Taylor, Matthew D. Miller, Brian Ray	Won	
2019	Queer Eye	-	Various: Joseph Deshano, Matthew Miller, Nova Taylor, Carlos Gamarra, Iain Tibbles and Tony Zajkowski	Won	
2020	Queer Eye	"Disabled but Not Really"	Nova Taylor and Tony Zajkowski	Nominated	
2021	Queer Eye	"Preaching Out Loud"	Various: Kris Byrnes, Susan Maridueña Barrett, Carlos J. Gamarra, Nathan Ochiltree, Bryan Ray and Tony Zajkowski	Nominated	
2022	Queer Eye	"Angels Gets Her Wing"	Various: Kris Byrnes, Susan Maridueña Barrett, Carlos J. Gamarra, Nathan Ochiltree, Bryan Ray and Tony Zajkowski	Nominated	
2023	Queer Eye	"Speedy for Life"	Various: Kris Byrnes, Susan Maridueña Barrett, Carlos J. Gamarra, Nathan Ochiltree, Bryan Ray and Tony Zajkowski	Nominated	
2024	Queer Eye	"Kiss the Sky"	Various: Kris Byrnes, Susan Maridueña Barrett, Carlos J. Gamarra, Nathan Ochiltree, Bryan Ray and Tony Zajkowski	Nominated	

Picture Editing for an Unstructured Reality Program

Outstanding Picture Editing for an Unstructured Reality Program
Year	Program	Episode	Nominee(s)	Result	Ref.
2020	Cheer	"God Blessed Texas"	Various: Arielle Kilker, David Nordstrom, Kate Hackett, Daniel McDonald, Mark Morgan, Sharon Weaver and Ted Woerner	Won	
2022	Cheer	"Daytona Pt.2: If the Judges Disagree"	Various: Daniel George McDonald, Daniel J. Clark, Zachary Fuhrer, Stefanie Maridueña, Dana Martell, Jody McVeigh-Schultz, Sharon Weaver and David Zucker	Nominated	
2022	Love on the Spectrum	"Episode 1"	Various: Rachel Grierson-Johns, Simon Callow-Wright and John Rosser	Won	
2024	Love on the Spectrum	"Episode 7"	Various: Rachel Grierson-Johns, Leanne Cole, Toby Stratmann and Gretchen Peterson	Nominated	

=== Casting ===
Queer Eye has been nominated for Outstanding Casting for a Reality Program three consecutive years, winning in 2018 and 2019. Love Is Blind was nominated in 2020.

Outstanding Casting for a Reality Program
Year	Program	Nominee(s)	Result	Ref.
2018	Queer Eye	Ally Capriotti Grant, Beyhan Oguz, Gretchen Palek, Danielle Gervais	Won	
2019	Queer Eye	Gretchen Palek, Danielle Gervais, Quinn Fegan, Ally Capriotti Grant, Pamela Vallarelli	Won	
2020	Queer Eye	Danielle Gervais, Beyhan Oguz, Pamela Vallarelli, Ally Capriotti Grant, Hana Sakata	Nominated	
2020	Love Is Blind	Donna Driscoll, Kelly Zack Castillo, Megan Feldman	Nominated	
2021	Queer Eye	Danielle Gervais, Natalie Pino, MaryAnne Nicoletti, Pamela Vallarelli, Ally Capriotti Grant	Nominated	
2022	Love on the Spectrum	Laura Ritchie, Kat Elmore and Jeffrey Marx	Won	
2022	Queer Eye	Danielle Gervais, Natalie Pino and Jessica Jorgensen	Nominated	
2023	Love is Blind	Donna Driscoll, Stephanie Lewis and Claire Loeb	Nominated	
2023	Queer Eye	Danielle Gervais, Natalie Pino and Jessica Jorgensen	Nominated	
2024	Love on the Spectrum	Cian O'Clery, Sean Bowman, Marina Nieto Ritger and Emma Choate	Won	
2024	Squid Game: The Challenge	Rachael Stubbins, Emma Shearer, Robyn Kass and Erika Dobrin	Nominated	
2025	Love on the Spectrum	Cian O'Clery, Sean Bowman and Emma Choate	Won	
2025	Queer Eye	Danielle Gervais, Jessica Jorgensen, Natalie Pino and Brian Puentes	Nominated	

== Animated Program ==
Outstanding animated program

In 2019, Big Mouth and BoJack Horseman were nominated for an Emmy. In 2020, both series received a second nomination in the category.

Outstanding Animated Program
Year	Program	Episode	Creator(s)	Result	Ref.
2019	Big Mouth	"The Planned Parenthood Show"	Andrew Goldberg, Nick Kroll, Mark Levin, Jennifer Flackett	Nominated	
2019	BoJack Horseman	"Free Churro"	Raphael Bob-Waksberg	Nominated	
2020	BoJack Horseman	"The View from Halfway Down"	Raphael Bob-Waksberg	Nominated	
2020	Big Mouth	"Disclosure The Movie: The Musical!"	Andrew Goldberg, Nick Kroll, Mark Levin, Jennifer Flackett	Nominated	
2021	Big Mouth	"The New Me"	Andrew Goldberg, Nick Kroll, Mark Levin, Jennifer Flackett	Nominated	
2022	Arcane	"When These Walls Come Tumbling Down"	Christian Linke, Marc Merrill, Brandon Beck, Jane Chung, Thomas Vu, Jérôme Combe, Melinda Wunsch Dilger, Pascal Charrue, Arnaud Delord, Alex Yee, Ash Brannon, Conor Sheehy, Barth Maunoury, and David Lyerly	Won	
2023	Entergalactic		Kenya Barris, Karina Manashil and Dennis Cummings	Nominated	
2024	Blue Eye Samurai	"The Tale of the Robbin and the Bride"	Michael Green	Won	

Outstanding short form animated program

In 2019 and 2021, Love, Death & Robots received a nomination for Outstanding Short Form Animated Program.

Outstanding Short Form Animated Program
Year	Program	Episode	Creator(s)	Result	Ref.
2019	Love, Death & Robots	"The Witness"	Tim Miller	Won	
2021	Love, Death & Robots	"Ice"	Tim Miller	Won	

== Variety Program ==
Variety Special (Pre-Recorded)

In 2017, the stand-up comedy specials Louis C.K. 2017 and Sarah Silverman: A Speck of Dust received a nomination. The following year, Netflix scored two nominations in the category with Steve Martin & Martin Short: An Evening You Will Forget for the Rest of Your Life and Dave Chappelle: Equanimity. In 2019, Hannah Gadsby: Nanette, Homecoming: A Film by Beyoncé, Springsteen on Broadway, and Wanda Sykes: Not Normal received a nomination. In 2020, five Netflix originals were nominated in the category with Dave Chappelle: Sticks & Stones winning.

Outstanding Variety Special (Pre-Recorded)
Year	Program	Genre	Result	Ref.
2017	Louis C.K. 2017	Stand-up comedy	Nominated	
2017	Sarah Silverman: A Speck of Dust	Stand-up comedy	Nominated	
2018	Dave Chappelle: Equanimity	Stand-up comedy	Won	
2018	Steve Martin & Martin Short: An Evening You Will Forget for the Rest of Your Life	Stand-up comedy	Nominated	
2019	Hannah Gadsby: Nanette	Stand-up comedy	Nominated	
2019	Homecoming: A Film by Beyoncé	Concert film	Nominated	
2019	Springsteen on Broadway	Concert residency	Nominated	
2019	Wanda Sykes: Not Normal	Stand-up comedy	Nominated	
2020	Dave Chappelle: Sticks & Stones	Stand-up comedy	Won	
2020	Hannah Gadsby: Douglas	Stand-up comedy	Nominated	
2020	Jerry Seinfeld: 23 Hours to Kill	Stand-up comedy	Nominated	
2020	John Mulaney & the Sack Lunch Bunch	Children's musical	Nominated	
2020	Tiffany Haddish: Black Mitzvah	Stand-up comedy	Nominated	
2021	Bo Burnham: Inside	Musical comedy	Nominated	
2021	8:46	Stand-up comedy	Nominated	
2022	The Closer	Stand-up comedy	Nominated	
2022	Norm Macdonald: Nothing Special	Stand-up comedy	Nominated	
2023	John Mulaney: Baby J	Stand-up comedy	Nominated	
2023	Trevor Noah: I Wish You Would	Stand-up comedy	Nominated	
2023	Wanda Sykes: I'm an Entertainer	Stand-up comedy	Nominated	
2024	Dave Chappelle: The Dreamer	Stand-up comedy	Nominated	
2024	Trevor Noah: Where Was I	Stand-up comedy	Nominated	

=== Directing and Writing ===
Directing for a Variety Special

In 2018, Stan Lathan was nominated for Dave Chappelle: Equanimity, Michael Bonfiglio for Jerry Seinfeld: Jerry Before Seinfeld, and Marcus Raboy for Steve Martin & Martin Short: An Evening You Will Forget for the Rest of Your Life. Ed Burke and Beyoncé Knowles-Carter received a nomination for their work on Homecoming: A Film by Beyoncé. Thom Zimny won for directing Springsteen on Broadway. In 2020, Stan Lathan won en Emmy for Dave Chappelle: Sticks & Stones.

Outstanding Directing for a Variety Special
Year	Program	Director(s)	Result	Ref.
2018	Dave Chappelle: Equanimity	Stan Lathan	Nominated	
2018	Jerry Seinfeld: Jerry Before Seinfeld	Michael Bonfiglio	Nominated	
2018	Steve Martin & Martin Short: An Evening You Will Forget for the Rest of Your Life	Marcus Raboy	Nominated	
2019	Homecoming: A Film by Beyoncé	Ed Burke and Beyoncé Knowles-Carter	Nominated	
2019	Springsteen on Broadway	Thom Zimny	Won	
2020	Dave Chappelle: Sticks & Stones	Stan Lathan	Won	
2021	Bo Burnham: Inside	Bo Burnham	Won	
2021	8:46	Dave Chappelle, Steven Bognar and Julia Reichert	Nominated	
2022	The Closer	Stan Lathan	Nominated	
2022	Norm Macdonald: Nothing Special	Norm Macdonald (posthumous) and Jeff Tomsic	Nominated	
2023	Chris Rock: Selective Outrage	Joel Gallen	Nominated	
2023	Wanda Sykes: I'm an Entertainer	Linda Mendoza	Nominated	
2024	Dave Chappelle: The Dreamer	Stan Lathan	Nominated	
2024	Trevor Noah: Where Was I	David Paul Meyer	Nominated	

Directing for a Variety Series

During the 72nd Primetime Emmy Awards, Linda Mendoza received a nomination for directing the episode "Flame Monroe", from the variety series Tiffany Haddish Presents: They Ready.

Outstanding Directing for a Variety Series
Year	Program	Episode	Director	Result	Ref.
2020	Tiffany Haddish Presents: They Ready	"Flame Monroe"	Linda Mendoza	Nominated	

Writing for a Variety Special

In 2016, Patton Oswalt won for his special Patton Oswalt: Talking for Clapping, meanwhile John Mulaney was nominated for John Mulaney: The Comeback Kid. In 2017, Louis C.K. and Sarah Silverman were nominated for their own individual specials. In 2018, John Mulaney won for his special John Mulaney: Kid Gorgeous at Radio City; Patton Oswalt: Annihilation (by Patton Oswalt) and Steve Martin & Martin Short: An Evening You Will Forget for the Rest of Your Life (by Steve Martin and Martin Short) were also nominated. In 2019 and 2020, out of five nominated Netflix specials, Hannah Gadsby and Dave Chappelle won for writing their respective specials.

Outstanding Writing for a Variety Special
Year	Program	Writer(s)	Result	Ref.
2016	John Mulaney: The Comeback Kid	John Mulaney	Nominated	
2016	Patton Oswalt: Talking for Clapping	Patton Oswalt	Won	
2017	Louis C.K. 2017	Louis C.K.	Nominated	
2017	Sarah Silverman: A Speck of Dust	Sarah Silverman	Nominated	
2018	John Mulaney: Kid Gorgeous at Radio City	John Mulaney	Won	
2018	Patton Oswalt: Annihilation	Patton Oswalt	Nominated	
2018	Steve Martin & Martin Short: An Evening You Will Forget for the Rest of Your Life	Steve Martin and Martin Short	Nominated	
2019	Adam Sandler: 100% Fresh	Adam Sandler	Nominated	
2019	Amy Schumer Growing	Amy Schumer	Nominated	
2019	Hannah Gadsby: Nanette	Hannah Gadsby	Won	
2019	Homecoming: A Film by Beyoncé	Beyoncé Knowles-Carter	Nominated	
2019	Wanda Sykes: Not Normal	Wanda Sykes	Nominated	
2020	Dave Chappelle: Sticks & Stones	Dave Chappelle	Won	
2020	Hannah Gadsby: Douglas	Hannah Gadsby	Nominated	
2020	John Mulaney & the Sack Lunch Bunch	John Mulaney and Marika Sawyer	Nominated	
2020	Patton Oswalt: I Love Everything	Patton Oswalt	Nominated	
2020	Seth Meyers: Lobby Baby	Seth Meyers	Nominated	
2021	Bo Burnham: Inside	Bo Burnham	Won	
2021	8:46	Dave Chappelle	Nominated	
2022	Ali Wong: Don Wong	Ali Wong	Nominated	
2022	Nicole Byer: BBW (Big Beautiful Weirdo)	Nicole Byer	Nominated	
2022	Norm Macdonald: Nothing Special	Norm Macdonald	Nominated	
2023	John Mulaney: Baby J	John Mulaney	Won	
2023	Chris Rock: Selective Outrage	Chris Rock	Nominated	
2023	Wanda Sykes: I'm an Entertainer	Wanda Sykes	Nominated	
2024	Jacqueline Novak: Get on Your Knees	Jacqueline Novak	Nominated	
2024	Mike Birbiglia: The Old Man and the Pool	Mike Birbiglia	Nominated	

=== Picture Editing ===
Outstanding Picture Editing for Variety Programming
Year	Program	Nominee(s)	Result	Ref.
2018	Dave Chappelle: Equanimity	Jeff U'ren	Nominated	
2020	Dave Chappelle: Sticks & Stones	Jeff U'ren	Nominated	
2021	Bo Burnham: Inside	Bo Burnham	Nominated	
2024	John Mulaney Presents: Everybody's in LA	Kelly Lyon, Sean McIlraith and Ryan McIlraith	Won	

== Voice-Over/Narrator/Host ==
Character Voice-Over Performance

In 2017, Mo Collins was nominated for her voice work in F Is for Family. Kristen Schaal received a nomination for BoJack Horseman. During the 71st Primetime Emmy Awards, Kevin Michael Richardson scored a nomination for F Is for Family. In 2020, Maya Rudolph won for her performance in the animated series Big Mouth.

Outstanding Character Voice-Over Performance
Year	Program	Character	Performer	Result	Ref.
2017	BoJack Horseman	Sarah Lynn	Kristen Schaal	Nominated	
2017	F Is for Family	Various characters	Mo Collins	Nominated	
2019	F Is for Family	Rosie	Kevin Michael Richardson	Nominated	
2020	Maya Rudolph	Connie the Hormone Monstress	Big Mouth	Won	
2021	Maya Rudolph	Connie the Hormone Monstress	Big Mouth	Won	
2021	Bridgerton	Lady Whistledown	Julie Andrews	Nominated	
2022	Maya Rudolph	Connie the Hormone Monstress	Big Mouth	Nominated	
2022	Bridgerton	Lady Whistledown	Julie Andrews	Nominated	
2023	Maya Rudolph	Connie the Hormone Monstress	Big Mouth	Won	
2023	Bridgerton	Lady Whistledown	Julie Andrews	Nominated	
2024	Maya Rudolph	Connie the Hormone Monstress	Big Mouth	Won	

Narrator

In 2017, Meryl Streep won for narrating the episode "The Price of Victory", of Five Came Back. In 2019, David Attenborough won the award for Our Planet.

Outstanding Narrator
Year	Program	Episode	Narrator	Result	Ref.
2017	Five Came Back	"The Price of Victory"	Meryl Streep	Won	
2019	Our Planet	"One Planet"	David Attenborough	Won	
2022	Our Great National Parks	"A World of Wonder"	Barack Obama	Won	
2023	Working: What We Do All Day	"The Middle"	Barack Obama	Won	
2023	Chimp Empire	"Reckoning"	Mahershala Ali	Nominated	
2023	Our Universe	"Chasing Starlight"	Morgan Freeman	Nominated	
2023	Life on Our Planet	"Chapter 1: The Rules of Life"	Morgan Freeman	Nominated	

Host

Outstanding Host for a Reality or Competition Program
Year	Program	Host	Result	Ref.
2019	Tidying Up with Marie Kondo	Marie Kondo	Nominated	
2020	Nailed It!	Nicole Byer	Nominated	
2020	Queer Eye	Bobby Berk, Karamo Brown, Tan France, Antoni Porowski, Jonathan Van Ness	Nominated	
2021	Queer Eye	Bobby Berk, Karamo Brown, Tan France, Antoni Porowski, Jonathan Van Ness	Nominated	
2021	Nailed It!	Nicole Byer	Nominated	
2022	Queer Eye	Bobby Berk, Karamo Brown, Tan France, Antoni Porowski, Jonathan Van Ness	Nominated	
2022	Nailed It!	Nicole Byer	Nominated	
2023	Queer Eye	Bobby Berk, Karamo Brown, Tan France, Antoni Porowski, Jonathan Van Ness	Nominated	
2023	Nailed It!	Nicole Byer	Nominated	

== Costumes ==
Contemporary Costumes

Outstanding Contemporary Costumes
Year	Program	Episode	Nominee(s)	Result	Ref.
2016	Grace and Frankie	"The Party"	Allyson Fanger, Lori DeLapp	Nominated	
2017	Grace and Frankie	"The Art Show"	Various: Allyson B. Fanger, Heather Pain, Lori DeLapp	Nominated	
2017	House of Cards	"Chapter 61"	Various: Johanna Argan, Kemal Harris, Jessica Wenger, Steffany Bernstein-Pratt	Nominated	
2018	Grace and Frankie	"The Expiration Date"	Various: Allyson B. Fanger, Heather Pain, Lori DeLapp	Nominated	
2019	Russian Doll	"Superiority Complex"	Various: Jennifer Rogien, Charlotte Svenson, Melissa Stanton	Won	
2019	Grace and Frankie	"The Wedding"	Allyson B. Fanger, Kristine Haag, Lori DeLapp	Nominated	
2020	Grace and Frankie	"The Tank"	Allyson B. Fanger, Kristine Haag, Lori DeLapp	Nominated	
2020	Unorthodox	"Part 2"	Various: Justine Seymour, Simone Kreska, Barbara Schramm	Nominated	
2020	The Politician	"Pilot"	Various: Lou Eyrich, Claire Parkinson, Lily Parkinson, Nora Pederson	Nominated	
2021	The Politician	"New York State of Mind"	Various: Claire Parkinson, Lily Parkinson, James Hammer, Laura Steinmann	Nominated	
2023	Wednesday	"Wednesday's Child Is Full of Woe"	Various: Colleen Atwood, Mark Sutherland, Robin Soutar, Claudia Littlefield and Adina Bucur	Won	
2023	Emily in Paris	"What's It All About..."	Various: Marylin Fitoussi, Herehau Ragonneau, Daniela Telle and Marie Fremont	Nominated	
2023	Beef	"The Birds Don't Sing, They Screech in Pain"	Various: Helen Huang, Austin Wittick, YJ Hwang and Mark Anthony Summers	Won	
2023	The Watcher	"Welcome, Friends"	Various: Lou Eyrich, Rudy Mance, Catherine Crabtree and Zakiya Dennis	Nominated	
2024	The Crown	"Sleep, Dearie Sleep"	Amy Roberts, Giles Gale and Sidonie Roberts	Won	
2024	Baby Reindeer	"Episode 4"	Mekel Bailey and Imogen Holness	Nominated	

Fantasy/Sci-Fi Costumes

Outstanding Fantasy/Sci-Fi Costumes
Year	Program	Episode	Nominee(s)	Result	Ref.
2018	A Series of Unfortunate Events	"The Vile Village, Part 1"	Various: Cynthia Summers, Phoebe Parsons, Kelsey Chobotar	Nominated	
2019	A Series of Unfortunate Events	"Penultimate Peril, Part 2"	Various: Cynthia Summers, Kelsey Chobotar, Phoebe Parsons, Lorelei Burk, Courtney McKenzie	Nominated	
2021	The Umbrella Academy	"The Frankel Footage"	Various: Christopher Hargadon, Heather Crepp, William Ng, Jane Fieber	Nominated	
2022	The Witcher	"Family"	Lucinda Wright and Rebecca Jempson	Nominated	

Costumes for a Variety, Nonfiction, or Reality Programming

Outstanding Costumes for a Variety, Nonfiction, or Reality Programming
Year	Program	Nominee(s)	Result	Ref.
2019	Homecoming: A Film by Beyoncé	Various: Marni Senofonte, Olivier Rousteing, Timothy White	Nominated	

Period Costumes

Outstanding Period Costumes
Year	Program	Episode	Nominee(s)	Result	Ref.
2017	The Crown	"Wolfert on Splash"	Various: Michele Clapton, Alex Fordham, Emma O'Loughlin, Kate O'Farrell	Won	
2018	The Crown	"Dear Mrs. Kennedy"	Various: Jane Petrie, Emily Newby, Basia Kuznar, Gaby Spanswick	Won	
2019	GLOW	"Every Potato Has a Receipt"	Various: Beth Morgan, Alexandra Casey, Sharon Taylor Sampson	Nominated	
2020	The Crown	"Cri de Coeur"	Various: Amy Roberts, Sidonie Roberts, Sarah Moore	Won	
2020	Hollywood	"A Hollywood Ending"	Various: Lou Eyrich, Sarah Evelyn, Tiger Curran, Suzy Freeman	Nominated	
2021	The Crown	"Terra Nullius"	Various: Amy Roberts, Sidonie Roberts, Sarah Moore	Nominated	
2021	The Queen's Gambit	"End Game"	Various: Gabriele Binder, Gina Krauss, Katrin Hoffmann, Nanrose Buchmann, Sparka Lee Hall	Won	
2021	Bridgerton	"Diamond of the First Water"	Various: Ellen Mirojnick, John W. Glaser III, Sanaz Missaghian, Kenny Crouch	Nominated	
2021	Halston	"Versailles"	Various: Jeriana San Juan, Catherine Crabtree, Cailey Breneman, Anne Newton-Harding	Nominated	
2021	Ratched	"Pilot"	Various: Lou Eyrich, Rebecca Guzzi, Allison Agler, Betsy Glick	Nominated	
2022	Bridgerton	"Harmony"	Various: Sophie Canale, Dougie Hawkes, Sarah June Mills, Charlotte Armstrong, Sanaz Missaghian and Kevin Pratten-Stone	Nominated	
2023	The Crown	"Mou Mou"	Various: Amy Roberts, Sidonie Roberts, Sarah Moore	Nominated	
2023	Queen Charlotte: A Bridgerton Story	"Crown Jewels"	Various: Lyn Elizabeth Paolo, Laura Frecon, Jovana Gospavic and Alex Locke	Nominated	
2023	Dahmer – Monster: The Jeffrey Dahmer Story	"Please Don't Go"	Various: Rudy Mance, Monica Chamberlain, Desmond Smith and Suzy Freeman	Nominated	
2024	Ripley	"IV La Dolce Vita"	Various: Maurizio Millenotti, Gianni Casalnuovo, Ernest Camilleri, Teresa D'Arienzo and Francesco Morabito	Nominated	

== Music ==
=== Composition ===
Music Composition for a Series

Outstanding Music Composition for a Series
Year	Series	Episode	Nominee(s)	Result	Ref.
2013	Arrested Development	"Flight of the Phoenix"	David Schwartz	Nominated	
2013	House of Cards	"Chapter 1"	Jeff Beal	Nominated	
2014	House of Cards	"Chapter 26"	Jeff Beal	Nominated	
2015	House of Cards	"Chapter 32"	Jeff Beal	Won	
2015	Chef's Table	"Francis Mallmann"	Duncan Thum	Nominated	
2016	Chef's Table	"Grant Achatz"	Duncan Thum	Nominated	
2017	The Crown	"Hyde Park Corner"	Rupert Gregson-Williams	Nominated	
2017	House of Cards	"Chapter 63"	Jeff Beal	Won	
2017	A Series of Unfortunate Events	"A Bad Beginning"	James Newton Howard	Nominated	
2018	Marvel's Jessica Jones	"AKA Playland"	Sean Callery	Nominated	
2019	House of Cards	"Chapter 73"	Jeff Beal	Nominated	
2020	Ozark	"All In"	Danny Bensi and Saunder Jurriaans	Nominated	
2020	The Crown	"Aberfan"	Martin Phipps	Nominated	
2021	The Crown	"The Balmoral Test"	Martin Phipps	Nominated	
2021	Bridgerton	"Diamond of the First Water"	Kris Bowers	Nominated	
2023	Wednesday	"Woe Is the Loneliest Number"	Danny Elfman and Chris Bacon	Nominated	
2024	The Crown	"Sleep, Dearie Sleep"	Martin Phipps	Nominated	

Limited or Anthology Series, Movie or Special

Outstanding Music Composition for a Limited or Anthology Series, Movie or Special
Year	Series	Episode	Nominee(s)	Result	Ref.
2017	Five Came Back	"The Price of Victory"	Jeremy Turner	Nominated	
2017	The White Helmets		Patrick Jonsson	Nominated	
2018	Black Mirror	"USS Callister"	Daniel Pemberton	Nominated	
2018	Godless	"Homecoming"	Carlos Rafael Rivera	Nominated	
2019	When They See Us	"Part 2"	Kris Bowers	Nominated	
2020	Hollywood	"Hooray for Hollywood, Part 2"	Nathan Barr	Nominated	
2020	Unorthodox	"Part 1"	Antonio Gambale	Nominated	
2021	The Queen's Gambit	"End Game"	Carlos Rafael Rivera	Won	
2024	All the Light We Cannot See	"Episode 4"	James Newton Howard	Nominated	

Music Composition for a Documentary Series or Special

Outstanding Music Composition for a Documentary Series or Special
Year	Program	Episode	Nominee(s)	Result	Ref.
2019	Our Planet	"One Planet"	Steven Price	Nominated	
2020	Becoming		Kamasi Washington	Nominated	
2020	Tiger King	"Not Your Average Joe"	Various: John Enroth, Albert Fox, Mark Mothersbaugh	Nominated	
2021	David Attenborough: A Life on Our Planet		Steven Price	Won	
2021	The Social Dilemma		Mark Crawford	Nominated	
2022	14 Peaks: Nothing Is Impossible		Nainita Desai	Nominated	
2022	The Tinder Swindler		Jessica Jones	Nominated	
2022	Return to Space		Mychael Danna and Harry Gregson-Williams	Nominated	
2023	Pamela, a Love Story		Blake Neely	Nominated	
2024	Beckham	"Seeing Red"	Anže Rozman and Camilo Forero	Nominated	

=== Direction/Supervision ===
Music Direction

Outstanding Music Direction
Year	Program	Episode	Nominee(s)	Result	Ref.
2016	A Very Murray Christmas		Paul Shaffer	Nominated	
2018	Homecoming: A Film by Beyoncé		Beyoncé Knowles-Carter and Derek Dixie	Nominated	

Music Supervision

Outstanding Music Supervision
Year	Program	Episode	Nominee(s)	Result	Ref.
2017	Master of None	"Amarsi Un Po"	Zach Cowie, Kerri Drootin	Nominated	
2017	Stranger Things	"The Weirdo on Maple Street"	Nora Felder	Nominated	
2018	Stranger Things	"Trick or Treat, Freak"	Nora Felder	Nominated	
2019	Quincy		Jasper Leak	Nominated	
2019	Russian Doll	"Nothing in This World Is Easy"	Brienne Rose	Nominated	
2020	Stranger Things	"The Case of the Missing Lifeguard"	Nora Felder	Nominated	
2021	The Crown	Fairytale	Sarah Bridge	Nominated	
2021	Bridgerton	"Diamond of the First Water"	Alexander Pantsavas	Nominated	
2021	Halston	"The Party's Over"	Amanda Krieg Thomas, Alexis Martin Woodall and Ryan Murphy	Nominated	
2022	Stranger Things	"Chapter Four: Dear Billy"	Nora Felder	Won	
2022	Ozark	"The Cousin of Death"	Gabe Hilfer	Nominated	
2023	Stranger Things	"Chapter Nine: The Piggybank"	Nora Felder	Nominated	
2024	Baby Reindeer	"Episode 4"	Catherine Grieves	Nominated	

== Sound Editing/Mixing ==
Sound Editing for a Limited or Anthology Series, Movie or Special

Outstanding Sound Editing for a Limited or Anthology Series, Movie or Special
Year	Series	Episode	Nominee(s)	Result	Ref.
2018	Black Mirror	"USS Callister"	Various: Kenny Clark, Michael Maroussas, Dario Swade, Ricky Butt, Oliver Ferris	Won	
2018	Godless	"Homecoming"	Various: Wylie Stateman, Eric Hoehn, Harry Cohen, Gregg Swiatlowski, Hector C. Gika, Leo Marcil, Sylvain Lasseur, Jackie Zhou, Tom Kramer	Nominated	
2019	When They See Us	"Part 4"	Various: John Benson, Susan Dudeck, Bruce Tanis, Chase Keene, Jesse Pomeroy, Naaman Haynes, Bobbi Banks, Elliott Koretz, Matt Wilson, Suat Ayas, Jen Monnar, Dawn Lunsford, Alicia Stevenson	Nominated	
2020	El Camino: A Breaking Bad Movie		Various: Nick Forshager, Todd Toon, Kathryn Madsen, Jane Boegel, Luke Gibleon, Jason Tregoe Newman, Bryant J. Fuhrmann, Jeff Cranford, Gregg Barbanell, Alex Ullrich	Nominated	
2021	The Queen's Gambit	"End Game"	Various: Gregg Swiatlowski, Eric Hirsch, Wylie Stateman, Leo Marcil, Mary Ellen Porto, Patrick Cicero, James David Redding III, Eric Hoehn, Tom Kramer, Rachel Chancey	Won	
2021	The Haunting of Bly Manor	"The Two Faces, Part 2"	Various: Trevor Gates, Jason Dotts, Kristen Hirlinger, Paul B. Knox, Piero Mura, James Miller, Matthew Thomas Hall, Mark Coffey, Ryan Meadows, Amy Barber, Julia Huberman, Brett "Snacky" Pierce, Jonathan Bruce, Ben Parker	Nominated	
2022	Midnight Mass	"Book VII: Revelation"	Various: Trevor Gates, Jonathan Wales, Kristen Hirlinger, Jason Dotts, Michael Baird, Paul Knox, Russell Topal, James Miller, Matthew Thomas Hall, Mark Coffey, Amy Barber, Julia Huberman, Brett "Snacky" Pierce, Ben Parker, Jonathan Bruce	Nominated	
2023	Dahmer – Monster: The Jeffrey Dahmer Story	"God of Forgiveness, God of Vengeance"	Various: Gary Megregian, Borja Sau, Bruce Tanis, David Klotz, Sam Munoz, Noel Vought	Nominated	
2023	Guillermo del Toro's Cabinet of Curiosities	"The Autopsy"	Various: Nelson Ferreira, Jill Purdy, Paul Davies, Bernard O'Reilly, Paul Germann, Tom Jenkins, Robert Hegedus, Rose Gregoris, Goro Koyama	Nominated	
2024	All the Light We Cannot See	"Episode 4"	Various: Craig Henighan, Ryan Cole, Emma Present, Jill Purdy, David Grimaldi, Matt Cloud, Gina Wark, Dan DiPrima, Steve Durkee, Steve Baine	Nominated	
2024	Ripley	"III Sommerso"	Various: Larry Zipf, Michael Feuser, Michael McMenomy, Lidia Tamplenizza, David Forshee, Bill R. Dean, Wyatt Sprague, Angelo Palazzo, Matt Haasch, Igor Nikolic, Dan Evans Farkas, Ben Schor, Jay Peck, Sandra Fox	Won	

== Statistics ==
=== Individuals with most nominations ===
Rank	Individual	Program	Categorie(s)	Total
1	Kevin Spacey	House of Cards	Outstanding Lead Actor in a Drama Series (5)	10
1	Kevin Spacey	House of Cards	Outstanding Drama Series (5)	10
1	Peter Morgan	The Crown	Outstanding Writing for a Drama Series (5)	10
1	Peter Morgan	The Crown	Outstanding Drama Series (5)	10
1	Jason Bateman	Ozark	Outstanding Drama Series (3)	10
1	Jason Bateman	Ozark	Outstanding Directing for a Drama Series (3)	10
1	Jason Bateman	Ozark	Outstanding Lead Actor in a Drama Series (4)	10
2	Robin Wright	House of Cards	Outstanding Lead Actress in a Drama Series (6)	8
2	Robin Wright	House of Cards	Outstanding Drama Series (2)	8
2	The Duffer Brothers	Stranger Things	Outstanding Drama Series (4)	8
2	The Duffer Brothers	Stranger Things	Outstanding Directing for a Drama Series (2)	8
2	The Duffer Brothers	Stranger Things	Outstanding Writing for a Drama Series (2)	8
3	Aziz Ansari	Master of None	Outstanding Comedy Series (2)	7
3	Aziz Ansari	Master of None	Outstanding Lead Actor in a Comedy Series (2)	7
3	Aziz Ansari	Master of None	Outstanding Writing for a Comedy Series (2)	7
3	Aziz Ansari	Master of None	Outstanding Directing for a Comedy Series (1)	7

== See also ==
- List of Primetime Emmy Awards received by HBO

Main

- List of accolades received by Netflix

Others

- List of TCA Awards received by Netflix
- List of BAFTA Awards received by Netflix
- List of Golden Globe Awards received by Netflix
- List of Daytime Emmy Awards received by Netflix
- List of Screen Actors Guild Awards received by Netflix
- List of Critics' Choice Television Awards received by Netflix
- List of Primetime Creative Arts Emmy Awards received by Netflix
