= List of Golden Globe Awards received by Netflix =

List of awards won by Netflix
- Total number of wins and nominations
Wins	49
Nominations	278
- References

Netflix has received multiple Golden Globe Award wins and nominations since 2014.

== Film ==
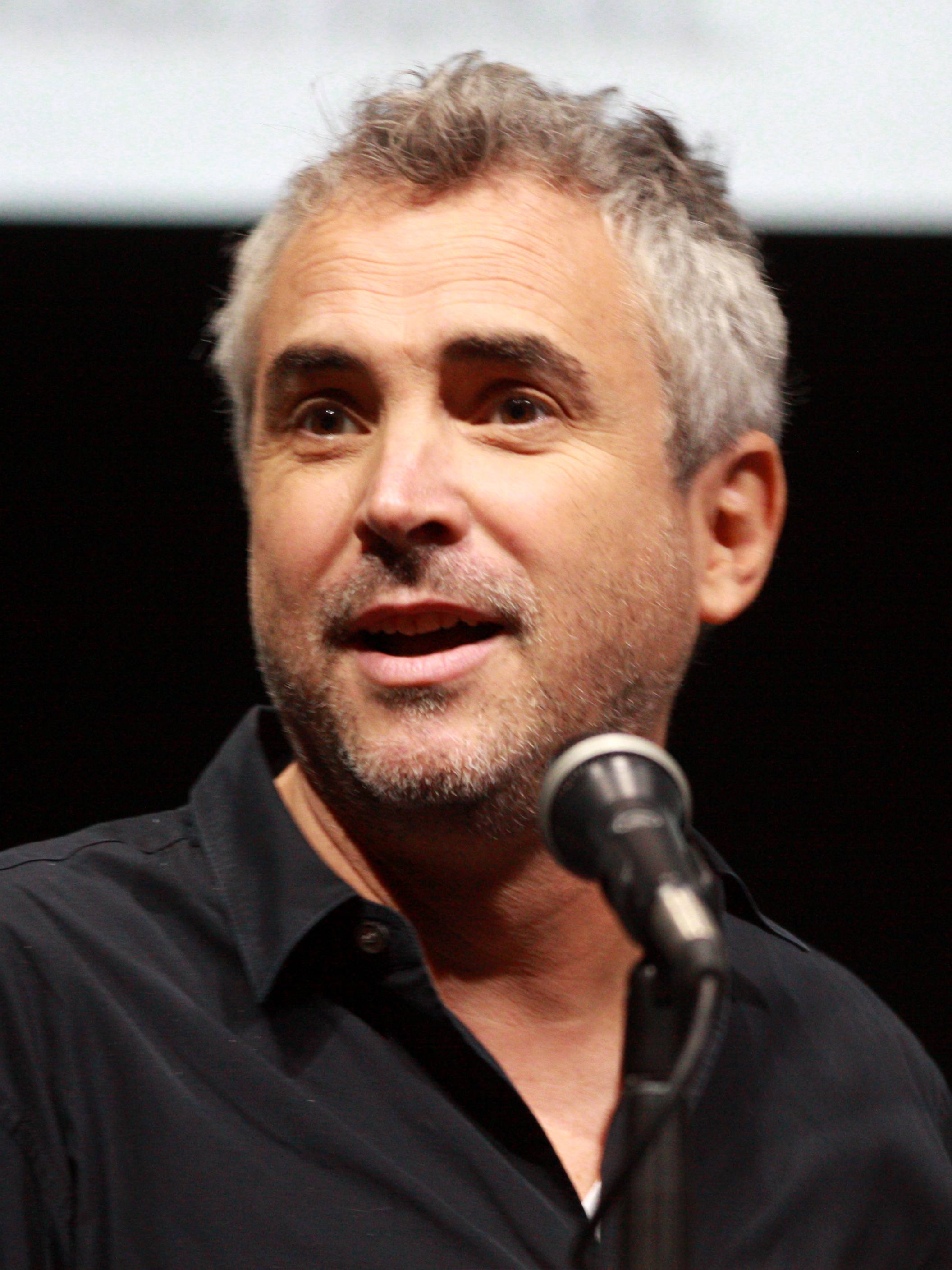
Alfonso Cuarón, 2019 winner for Roma

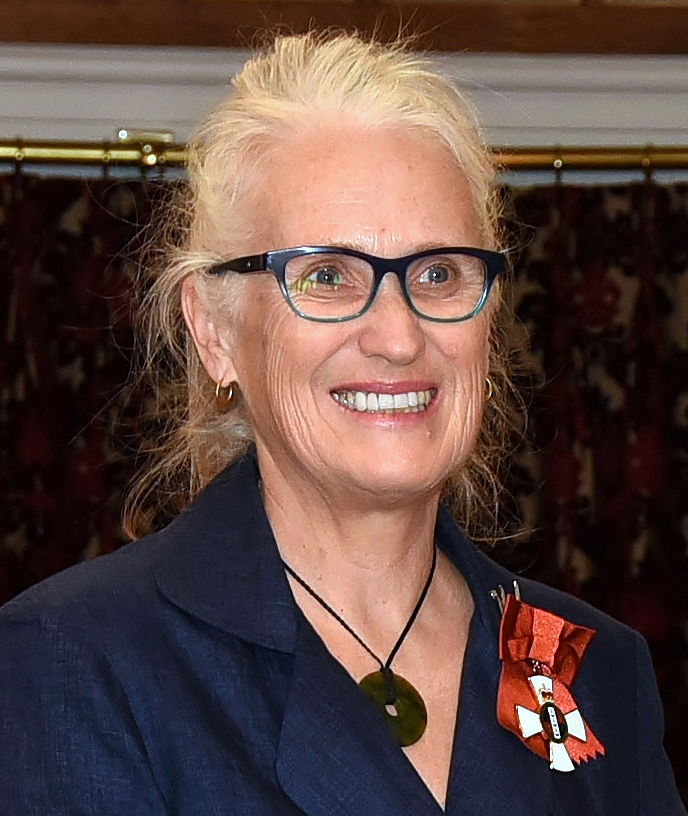
Jane Campion, 2022 winner for The Power of the Dog

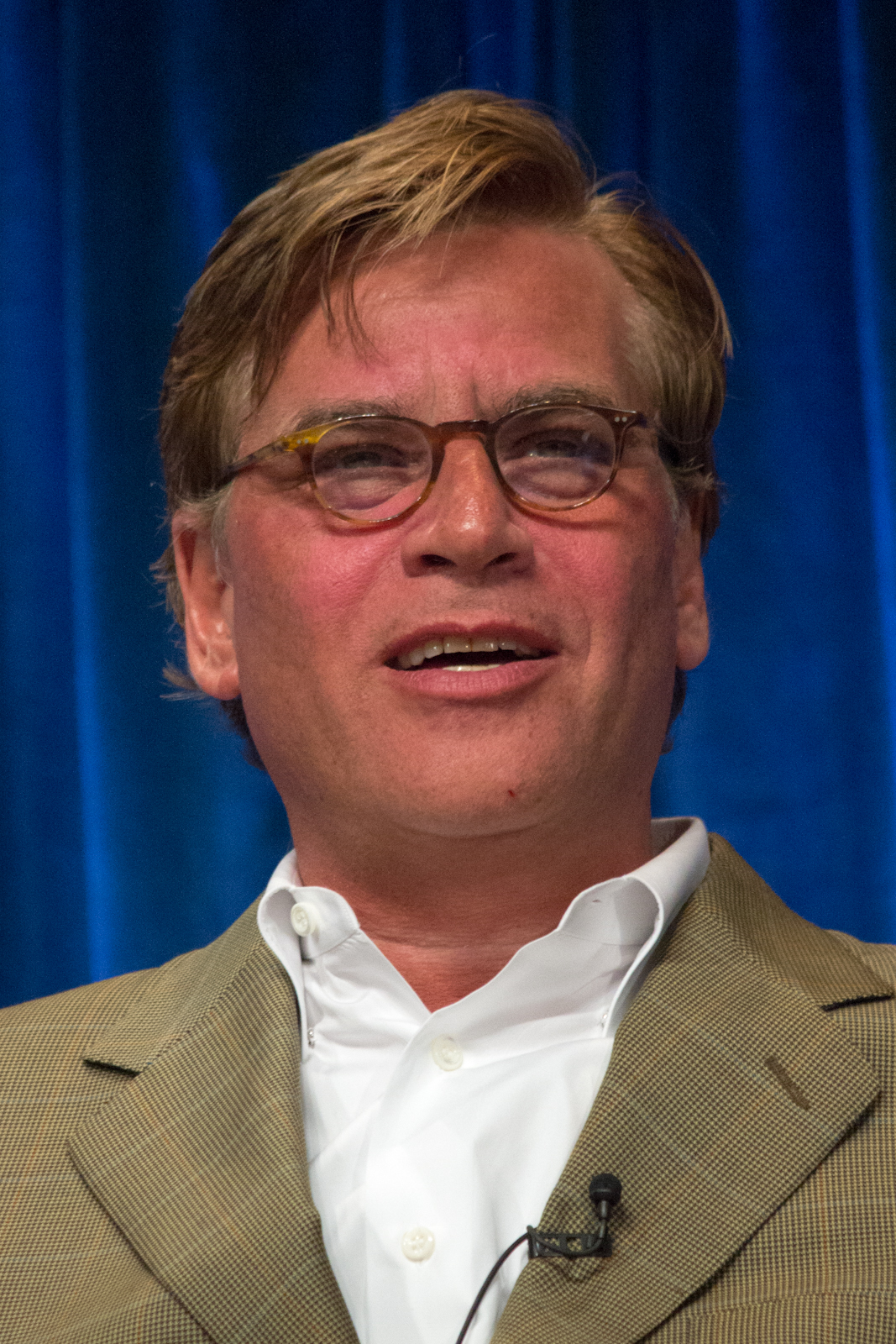
Aaron Sorkin, 2021 winner for The Trial of the Chicago 7

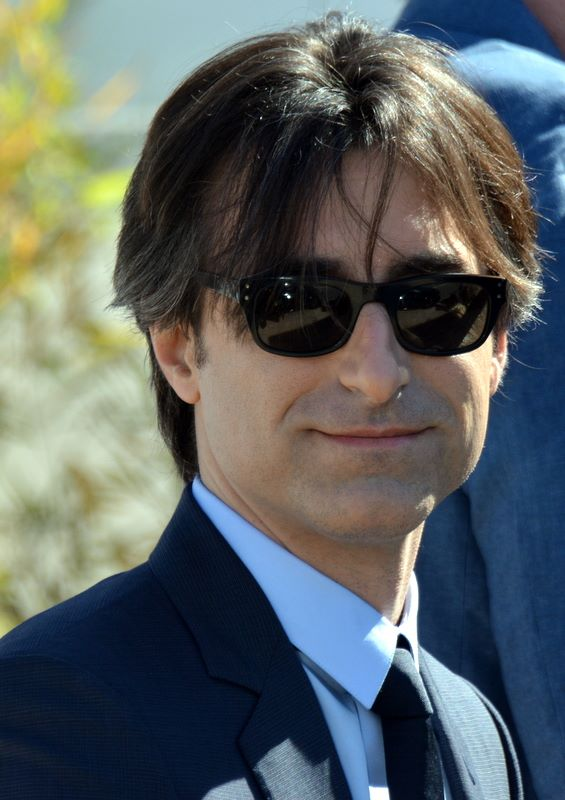
Noah Baumbach, 2020 nominee for Marriage Story

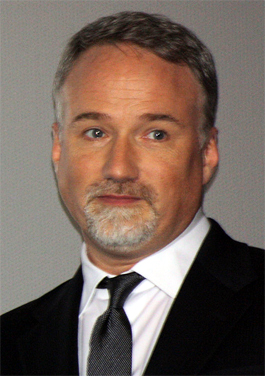
David Fincher, 2021 nominee for Mank

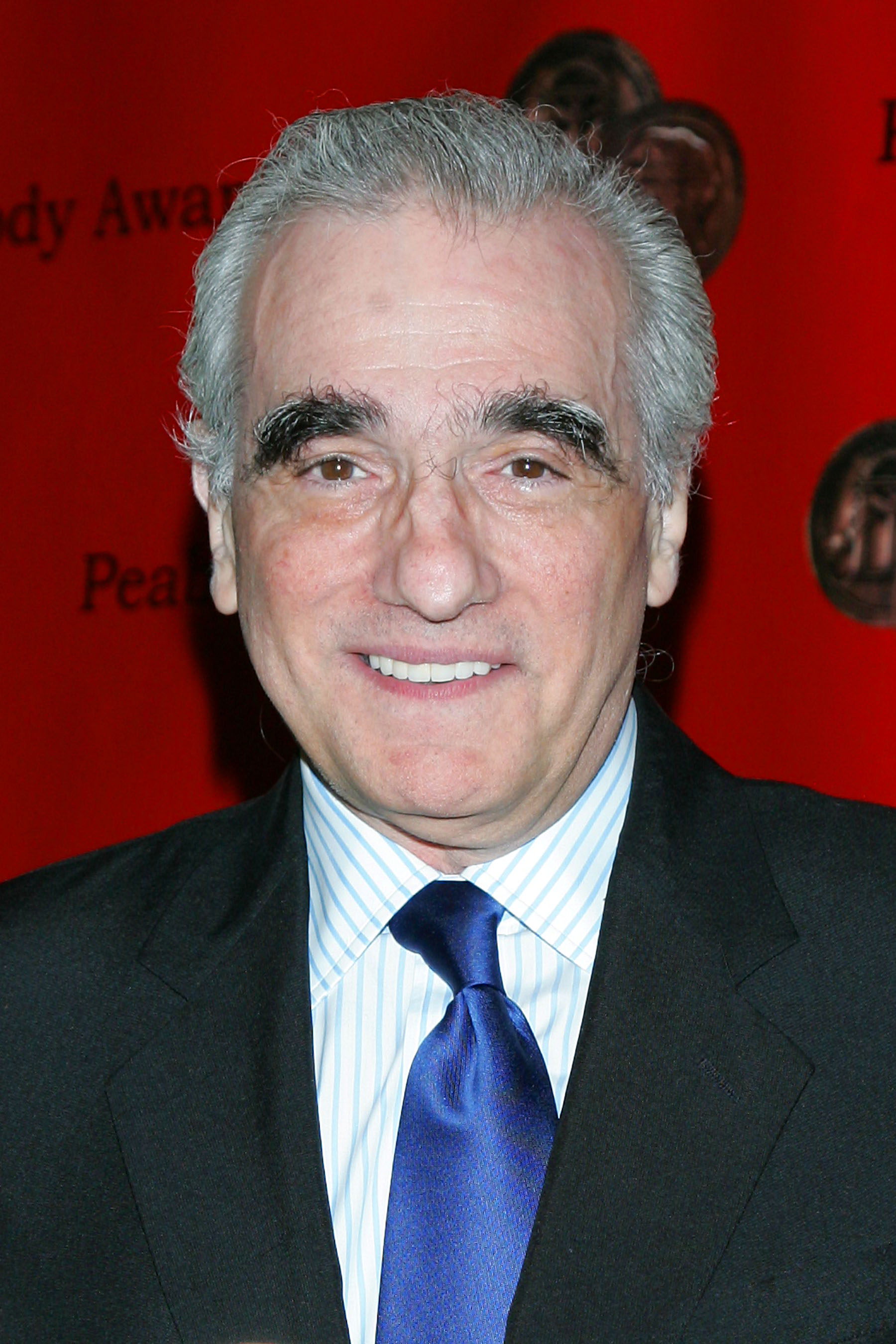
Martin Scorsese, 2020 nominee for The Irishman

=== Best Director ===
Best Director
Year	Nominee	Film	Result	Ref.
2019	Alfonso Cuarón	Roma	Won	
2020	Martin Scorsese	The Irishman	Nominated	
2021	David Fincher	Mank	Nominated	
2021	Aaron Sorkin	The Trial of the Chicago 7	Nominated	
2022	Jane Campion	The Power of the Dog	Won	
2022	Maggie Gyllenhaal	The Lost Daughter	Nominated	
2024	Bradley Cooper	Maestro	Nominated	
2025	Jacques Audiard	Emilia Pérez	Nominated	
2026	Guillermo del Toro	Frankenstein	Nominated	

=== Best Screenplay ===
Best Screenplay
Year	Nominee	Film	Result	Ref.
2019	Alfonso Cuarón	Roma	Nominated	
2020	Noah Baumbach	Marriage Story	Nominated	
2020	Anthony McCarten	The Two Popes	Nominated	
2020	Steven Zaillian	The Irishman	Nominated	
2021	Jack Fincher	Mank	Nominated	
2021	Aaron Sorkin	The Trial of the Chicago 7	Won	
2022	Jane Campion	The Power of the Dog	Nominated	
2022	Adam McKay	Don't Look Up	Nominated	
2025	Jacques Audiard	Emilia Pérez	Nominated	

=== Best Animated Feature Film ===
Best Animated Feature Film
Year	Film	Producer(s)	Result	Ref.
2021	Over the Moon	Peilin Chou and Gennie Rim	Nominated	
2023	Guillermo del Toro's Pinocchio	Guillermo del Toro and Mark Gustafson	Won	
2025	Wallace & Gromit: Vengeance Most Fowl	Richard Beek	Nominated	
2026	KPop Demon Hunters	Michelle Wong	Won	

=== Best Foreign Language Film ===
Best Foreign Language Film
Year	Film	Director	Country	Result	Ref.
2017	Divines	Houda Benyamina	France	Nominated	
2018	First They Killed My Father	Angelina Jolie	Cambodia	Nominated	
2019	Roma	Alfonso Cuarón	Mexico	Won	
2021	The Life Ahead	Edoardo Ponti	Italy	Nominated	
2022	The Hand of God	Paolo Sorrentino	Italy	Nominated	
2023	All Quiet on the Western Front	Edward Berger	Germany	Nominated	
2024	Society of the Snow	J. A. Bayona	Spain	Nominated	
2025	Emilia Pérez	Jacques Audiard	France	Won	

=== Best Motion Picture – Drama ===
Best Motion Picture – Drama
Year	Film	Producer(s)	Result	Ref.
2020	The Irishman	Gerald Chamales, Robert De Niro, Randall Emmett, Gabriele Israilovici, Emma Tillinger Koskoff, Gastón Pavlovich, Jane Rosenthal, Martin Scorsese, and Irwin Winkler	Nominated	
2020	Marriage Story	Noah Baumbach and David Heyman	Nominated	
2020	The Two Popes	Jonathan Eirich, Dan Lin, and Tracey Seaward	Nominated	
2021	Mank	Ceán Chaffin, Eric Roth, and Douglas Urbanski	Nominated	
2021	The Trial of the Chicago 7	Stuart M. Besser, Matt Jackson, Marc Platt, and Tyler Thompson	Nominated	
2022	The Power of the Dog	Emile Sherman, Iain Canning, Roger Frappier, Jane Campion, and Tanya Seghatchian	Won	
2024	Maestro	Martin Scorsese, Steven Spielberg, Bradley Cooper, Fred Berner, Amy Durning, and Kristie Macosko Krieger	Nominated	
2026	Frankenstein	Guillermo del Toro, J. Miles Dale, and Scott Stuber	Nominated	

=== Best Motion Picture – Musical or Comedy ===
Best Motion Picture – Musical or Comedy
Year	Film	Producer(s)	Result	Ref.
2020	Dolemite Is My Name	John Davis, John Fox, and Eddie Murphy	Nominated	
2021	The Prom	Adam Anders, Dori Berinstein, Bill Damaschke, Ryan Murphy, and Alexis Martin Woodall	Nominated	
2022	Don't Look Up	Adam McKay and Kevin Messick	Nominated	
2022	tick, tick... Boom!	Brian Grazer, Ron Howard, Julie Oh, and Lin-Manuel Miranda	Nominated	
2023	Glass Onion: A Knives Out Mystery	Ram Bergman and Rian Johnson	Nominated	
2024	May December	Jessica Elbaum, Will Ferrell, Grant S. Johnson, Pamela Koffler, Tyler W. Konney, Sophie Mas, Natalie Portman, Christine Vachon	Nominated	
2025	Emilia Pérez	Jacques Audiard, Pascal Caucheteux, Valérie Schermann, Anthony Vaccarello	Won	
2026	Nouvelle Vague	Michèle Pétin and Laurent Pétin	Nominated	

=== Cinematic and Box Office Achievement ===
Cinematic and Box Office Achievement
Year	Film	Producer(s)	Result	Ref.
2026	KPop Demon Hunters	Michelle Wong	Nominated	

== Television ==
=== Best Television Series – Drama ===
Best Television Series – Drama
Year	Series	Creator(s)	Result	Ref.
2014	House of Cards	Beau Willimon	Nominated	
2015	House of Cards	Beau Willimon	Nominated	
2016	Narcos	Carlo Bernard, Chris Brancato, and Doug Miro	Nominated	
2017	The Crown	Peter Morgan	Won	
2017	Stranger Things	The Duffer Brothers	Nominated	
2018	The Crown	Peter Morgan	Nominated	
2018	Stranger Things	The Duffer Brothers	Nominated	
2019	Bodyguard	Jed Mercurio	Nominated	
2020	The Crown	Peter Morgan	Nominated	
2021	The Crown	Peter Morgan	Won	
2021	Ozark	Bill Dubuque and Mark Williams	Nominated	
2021	Ratched	Evan Romansky	Nominated	
2022	Lupin	George Kay and François Uzan	Nominated	
2022	Squid Game	Hwang Dong-hyuk	Nominated	
2023	The Crown	Peter Morgan	Nominated	
2023	Ozark	Bill Dubuque and Mark Williams	Nominated	
2024	The Crown	Peter Morgan	Nominated	
2024	The Diplomat	Debora Cahn	Nominated	
2025	The Diplomat	Debora Cahn	Nominated	
2026	The Diplomat	Debora Cahn	Nominated	

=== Best Miniseries or Television Film ===
Best Miniseries or Television Film
Year	Program	Creator(s)	Result	Ref.
2020	Unbelievable	Michael Chabon, Susannah Grant, and Ayelet Waldman	Nominated	
2021	The Queen's Gambit	Scott Frank and Allan Scott	Won	
2021	Unorthodox	Alexa Karolinski and Anna Winger	Nominated	
2022	Maid	Molly Smith Metzler	Nominated	
2023	Dahmer – Monster: The Jeffrey Dahmer Story	Ian Brennan and Ryan Murphy	Nominated	
2024	Beef	Lee Sung Jin	Won	
2024	All the Light We Cannot See	Steven Knight	Nominated	
2025	Baby Reindeer	Richard Gadd	Won	
2025	Monsters: The Lyle and Erik Menendez Story	Ian Brennan and Ryan Murphy	Nominated	
2025	Ripley	Steven Zaillian	Nominated	
2026	Adolescence	Jack Thorne and Stephen Graham	Won	
2026	The Beast in Me	Gabe Rotter	Nominated	
2026	Black Mirror	Charlie Brooker	Nominated	

=== Best Television Series – Musical or Comedy ===
Best Television Series – Musical or Comedy
Year	Series	Creator(s)	Result	Ref.
2015	Orange Is the New Black	Jenji Kohan	Nominated	
2016	Orange Is the New Black	Jenji Kohan	Nominated	
2018	Master of None	Aziz Ansari and Alan Yang	Nominated	
2019	The Kominsky Method	Chuck Lorre	Won	
2020	The Kominsky Method	Chuck Lorre	Nominated	
2020	The Politician	Ryan Murphy	Nominated	
2021	Emily in Paris	Darren Star	Nominated	
2023	Wednesday	Alfred Gough and Miles Millar	Nominated	
2025	The Gentlemen	Guy Ritchie	Nominated	
2025	Nobody Wants This	Erin Foster	Nominated	
2026	Nobody Wants This	Erin Foster	Nominated	

== Performance in a Motion Picture ==
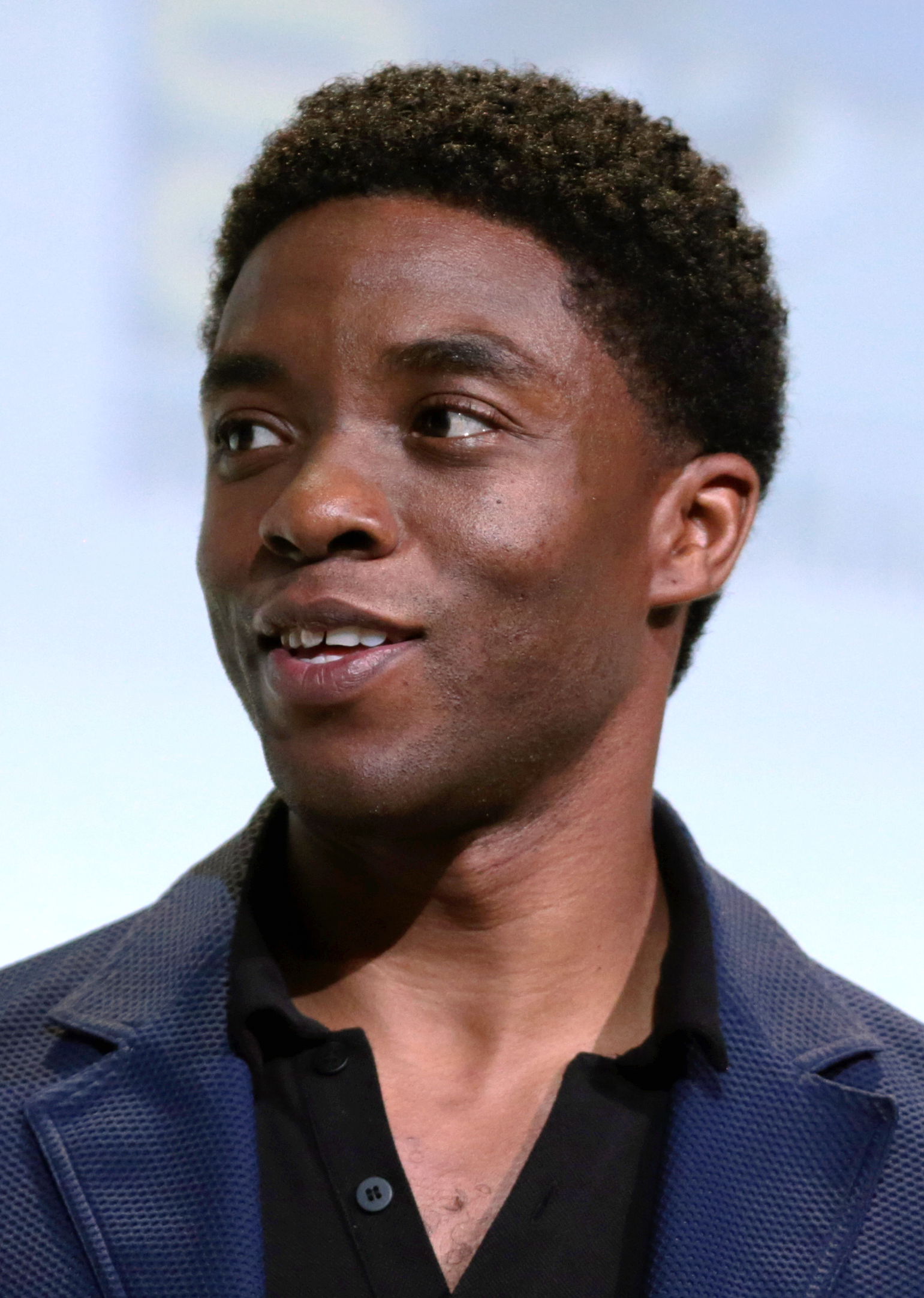
Chadwick Boseman, 2021 winner for Ma Rainey's Black Bottom

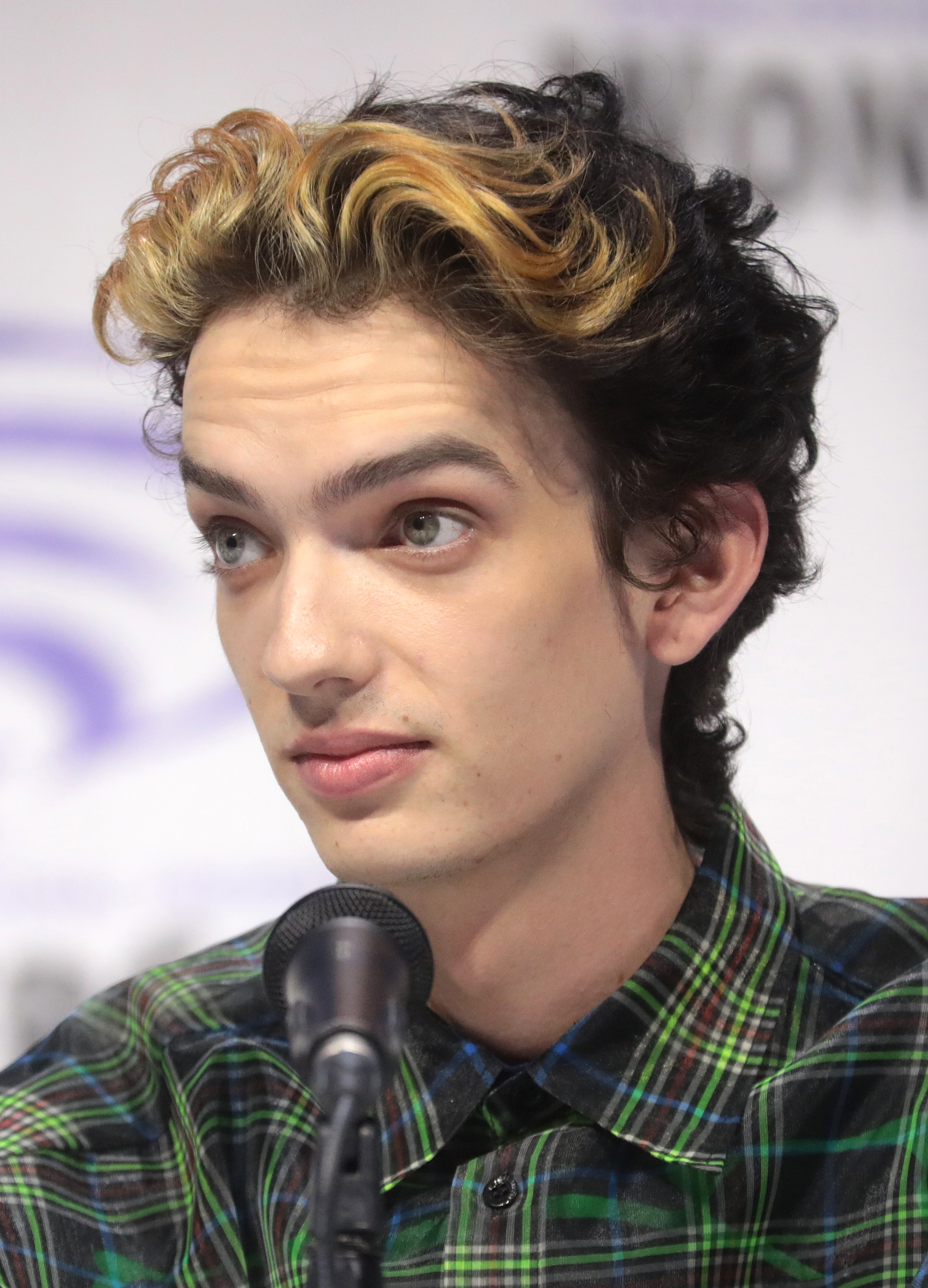
Kodi Smit-McPhee, 2022 winner for The Power of the Dog

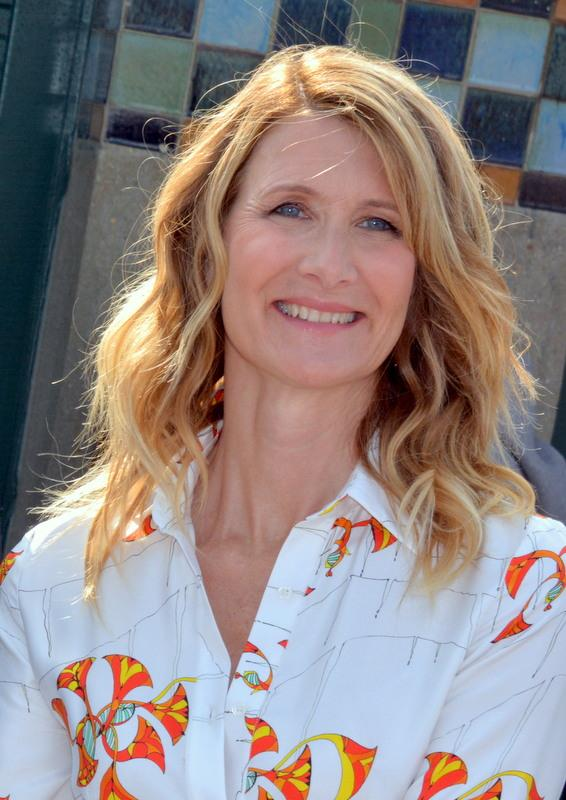
Laura Dern, 2020 winner for Marriage Story

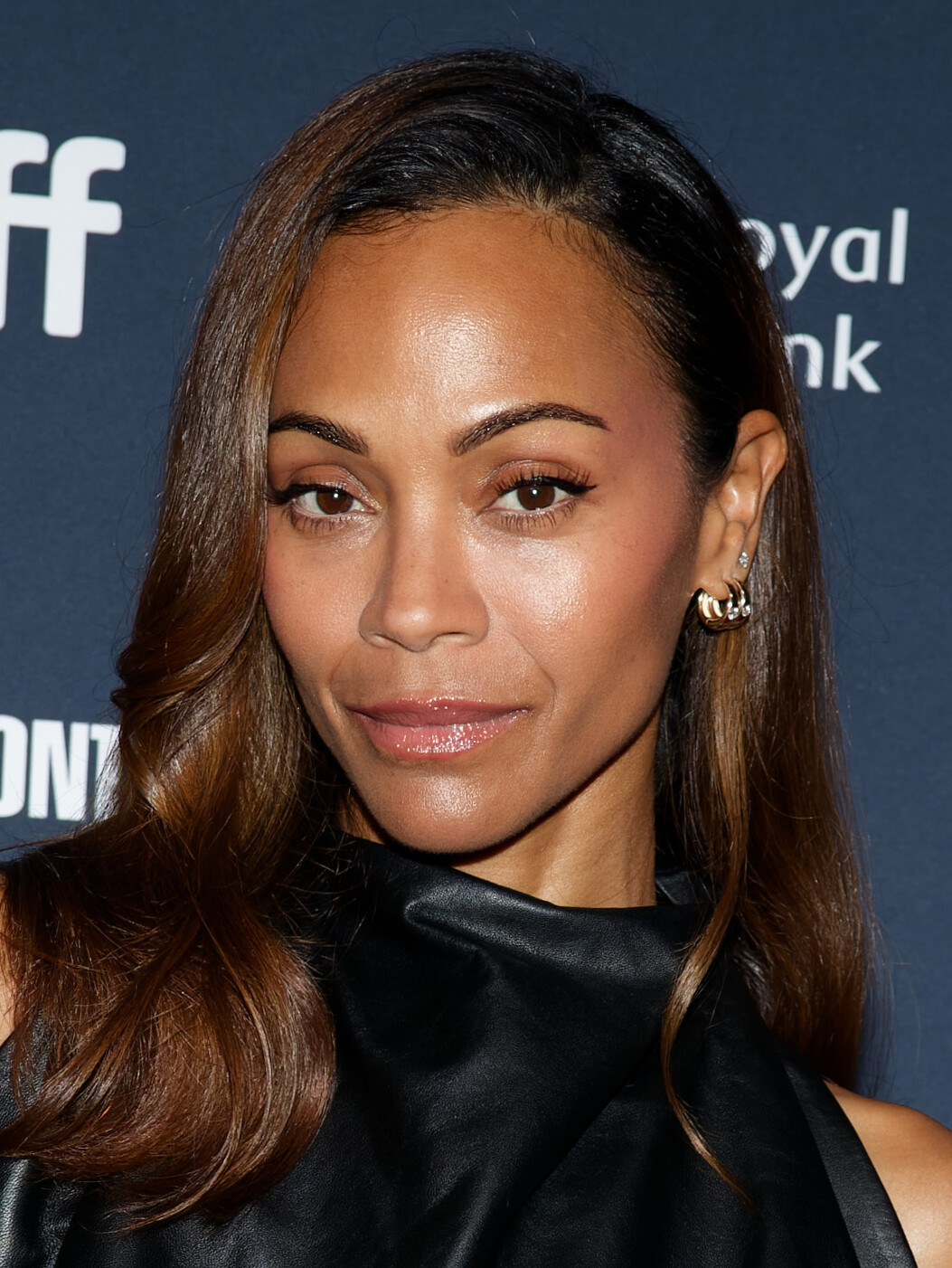
Zoe Saldaña, 2025 winner for Emilia Pérez

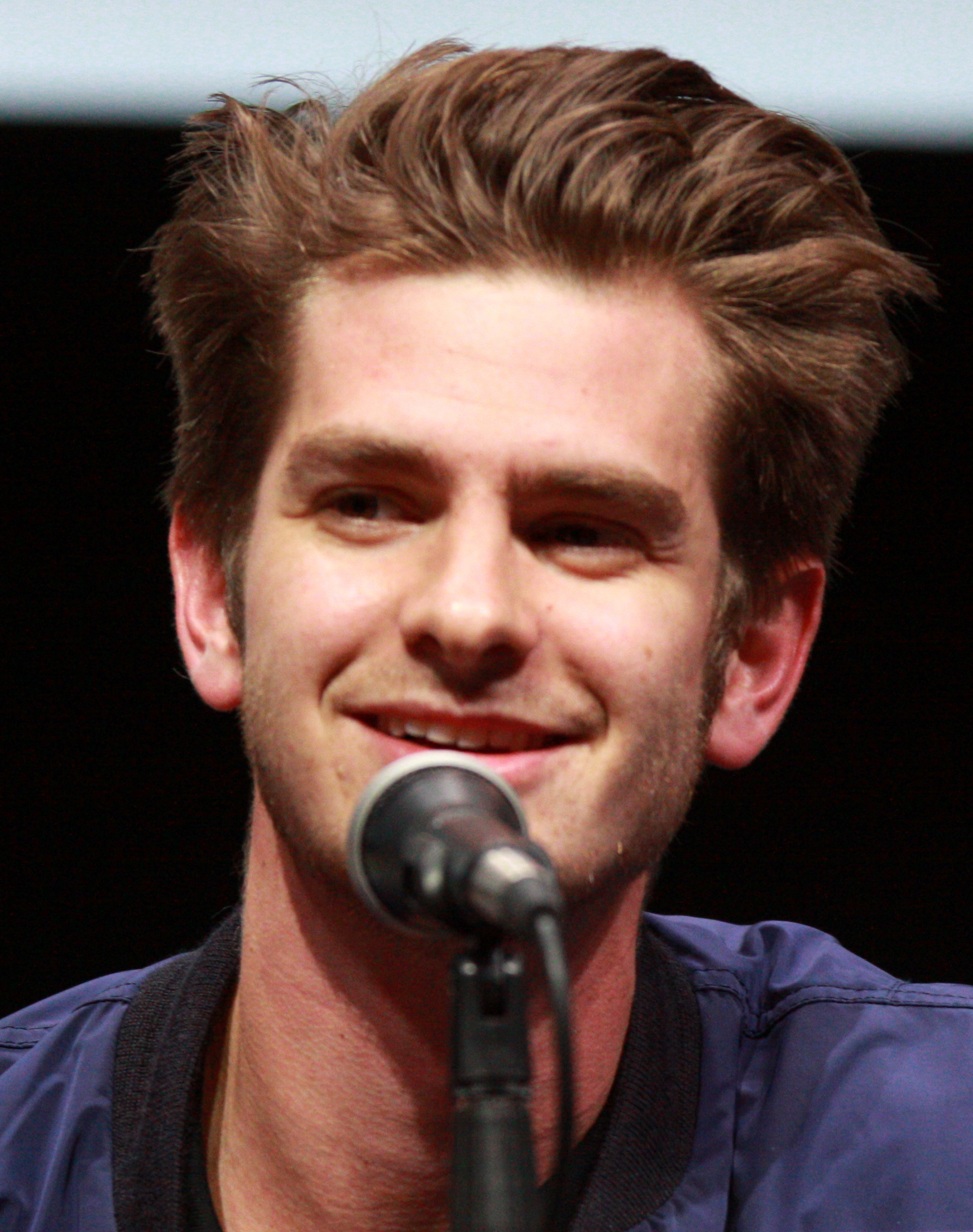
Andrew Garfield, 2022 winner for tick, tick... Boom!

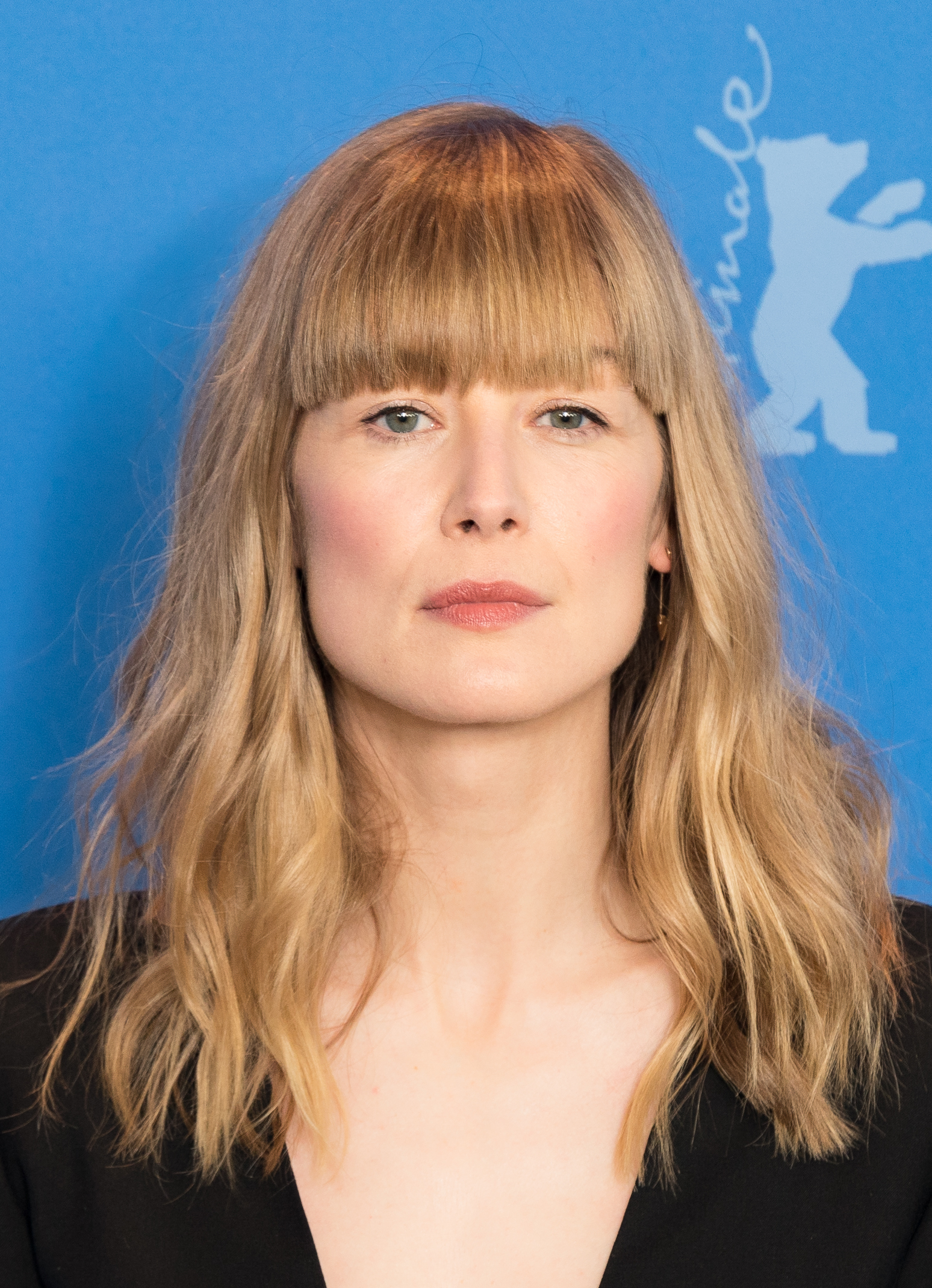
Rosamund Pike, 2021 winner for I Care a Lot

=== Best Actor – Motion Picture Drama ===
Best Actor – Motion Picture Drama
Year	Nominee	Character	Film	Result	Ref.
2020	Adam Driver	Charlie Barber	Marriage Story	Nominated	
2020	Jonathan Pryce	Cardinal Jorge Mario Bergoglio	The Two Popes	Nominated	
2021	Chadwick Boseman	Levee Green	Ma Rainey's Black Bottom	Won	
2021	Gary Oldman	Herman J. Mankiewicz	Mank	Nominated	
2022	Benedict Cumberbatch	Phil Burbank	The Power of the Dog	Nominated	
2024	Bradley Cooper	Leonard Bernstein	Maestro	Nominated	
2024	Colman Domingo	Bayard Rustin	Rustin	Nominated	
2026	Joel Edgerton	Robert Grainier	Train Dreams	Nominated	
2026	Oscar Isaac	Victor Frankenstein	Frankenstein	Nominated	

=== Best Actress – Motion Picture Drama ===
Best Actress – Motion Picture Drama
Year	Nominee	Character	Film	Result	Ref.
2020	Scarlett Johansson	Nicole Barber	Marriage Story	Nominated	
2021	Viola Davis	Ma Rainey	Ma Rainey's Black Bottom	Nominated	
2021	Vanessa Kirby	Martha Weiss	Pieces of a Woman	Nominated	
2022	Olivia Colman	Leda Caruso	The Lost Daughter	Nominated	
2023	Ana de Armas	Marilyn Monroe	Blonde	Nominated	
2024	Annette Bening	Diana Nyad	Nyad	Nominated	
2024	Carey Mulligan	Felicia Montealegre Bernstein	Maestro	Nominated	

=== Best Supporting Actor – Motion Picture ===
Best Supporting Actor – Motion Picture
Year	Nominee	Character	Film	Result	Ref.
2016	Idris Elba	Commandant	Beasts of No Nation	Nominated	
2020	Al Pacino	Jimmy Hoffa	The Irishman	Nominated	
2020	Joe Pesci	Russell Bufalino	The Irishman	Nominated	
2020	Anthony Hopkins	Pope Benedict XVI	The Two Popes	Nominated	
2021	Sacha Baron Cohen	Abbie Hoffman	The Trial of the Chicago 7	Nominated	
2022	Kodi Smit-McPhee	Peter Gordon	The Power of the Dog	Won	
2023	Eddie Redmayne	Charles Cullen	The Good Nurse	Nominated	
2024	Charles Melton	Joe Yoo	May December	Nominated	
2026	Jacob Elordi	The Creature	Frankenstein	Nominated	
2026	Adam Sandler	Ron Sukenick	Jay Kelly	Nominated	

=== Best Supporting Actress – Motion Picture ===
Best Supporting Actress – Motion Picture
Year	Nominee	Character	Film	Result	Ref.
2018	Mary J. Blige	Florence Jackson	Mudbound	Nominated	
2020	Laura Dern	Nora Fanshaw	Marriage Story	Won	
2021	Glenn Close	Bonnie "Mamaw" Vance	Hillbilly Elegy	Nominated	
2021	Amanda Seyfried	Marion Davies	Mank	Nominated	
2021	Helena Zengel	Johanna Leonberger / Cicada	News of the World	Nominated	
2022	Kirsten Dunst	Rose Gordon	The Power of the Dog	Nominated	
2022	Ruth Negga	Clare Bellew	Passing	Nominated	
2024	Jodie Foster	Bonnie Stoll	Nyad	Nominated	
2024	Julianne Moore	Gracie Atherton-Yoo	May December	Nominated	
2025	Zoe Saldaña	Rita Mora Castro	Emilia Pérez	Won	
2025	Selena Gomez	Jessi Del Monte	Emilia Pérez	Nominated	

=== Best Actor – Motion Picture Musical or Comedy ===
Best Actor – Motion Picture Musical or Comedy
Year	Nominee	Character	Film	Result	Ref.
2020	Eddie Murphy	Rudy Ray Moore	Dolemite Is My Name	Nominated	
2021	James Corden	Barry Glickman	The Prom	Nominated	
2022	Leonardo DiCaprio	Dr. Randall Mindy	Don't Look Up	Nominated	
2022	Andrew Garfield	Jonathan Larson	tick, tick... Boom!	Won	
2023	Daniel Craig	Benoit Blanc	Glass Onion: A Knives Out Mystery	Nominated	
2023	Adam Driver	Jack Gladney	White Noise	Nominated	
2026	George Clooney	Jay Kelly	Jay Kelly	Nominated	

=== Best Actress – Motion Picture Musical or Comedy ===
Best Actress – Motion Picture Musical or Comedy
Year	Nominee	Character	Film	Result	Ref.
2021	Rosamund Pike	Marla Grayson	I Care a Lot	Won	
2022	Jennifer Lawrence	Kate Dibiasky	Don't Look Up	Nominated	
2024	Natalie Portman	Elizabeth Berry	May December	Nominated	
2025	Karla Sofía Gascón	Emilia Pérez / Juan "Manitas" Del Monte	Emilia Pérez	Nominated	

== Performance in Television ==
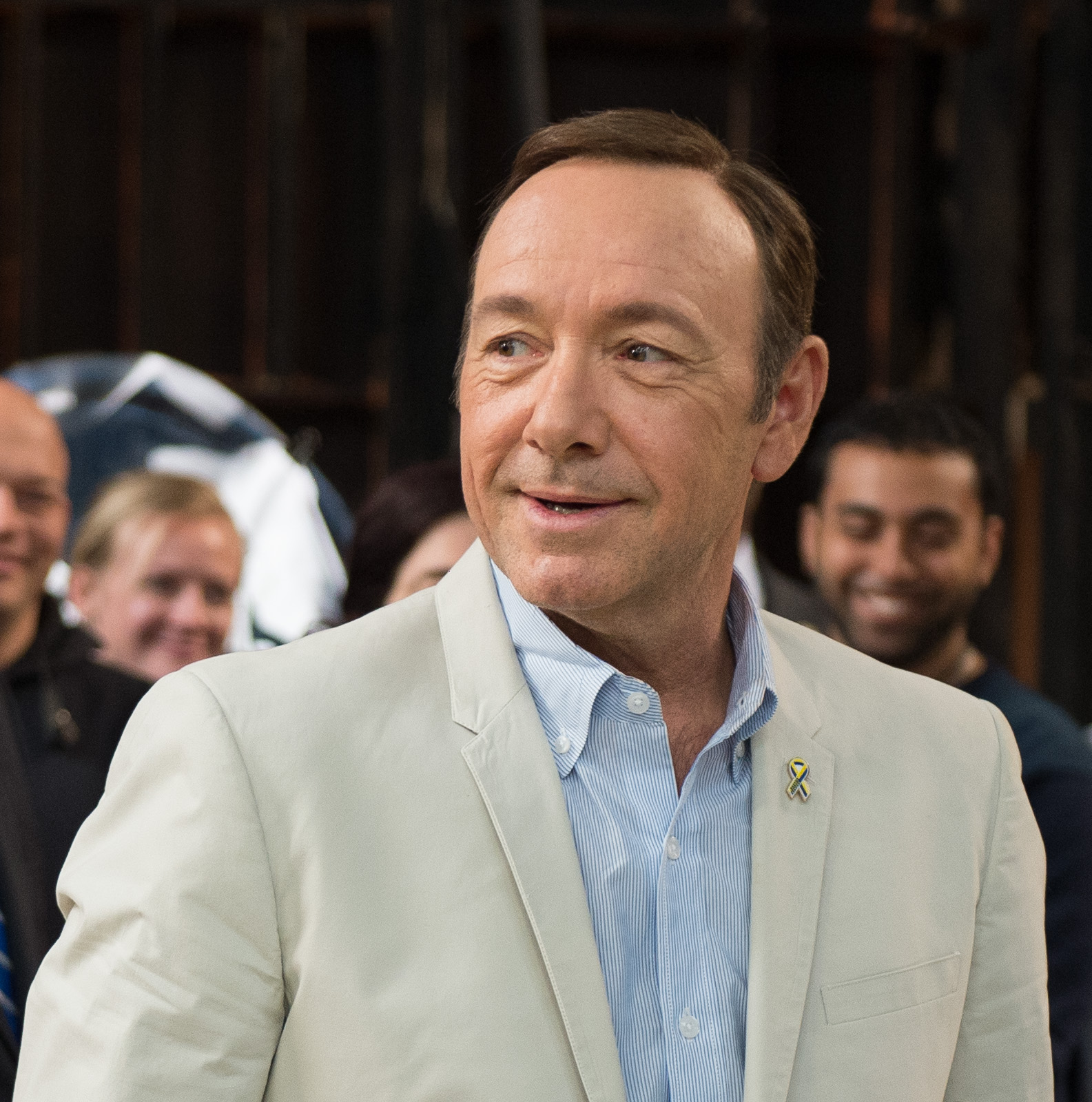
Kevin Spacey, 2015 winner for House of Cards

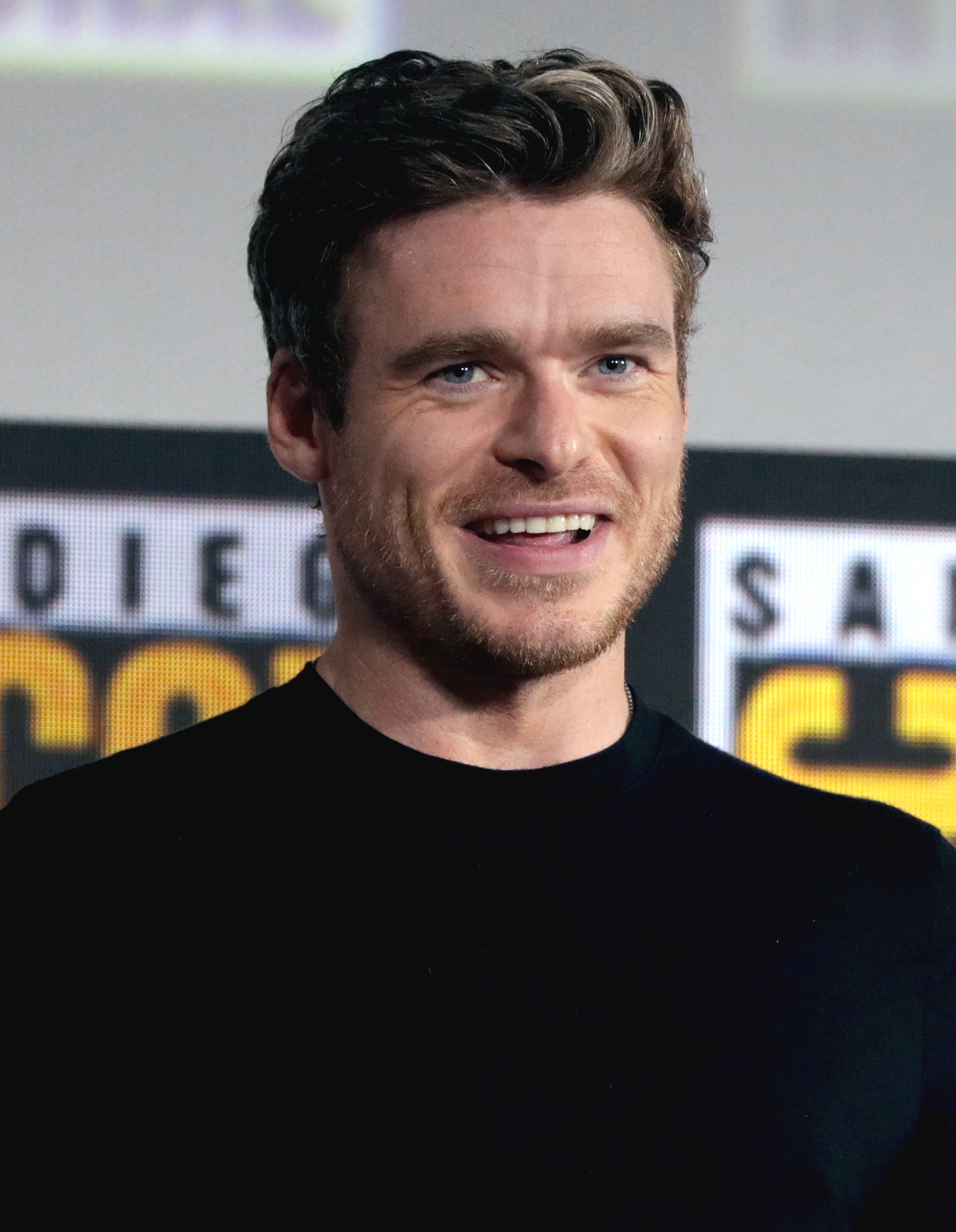
Richard Madden, 2019 winner for Bodyguard

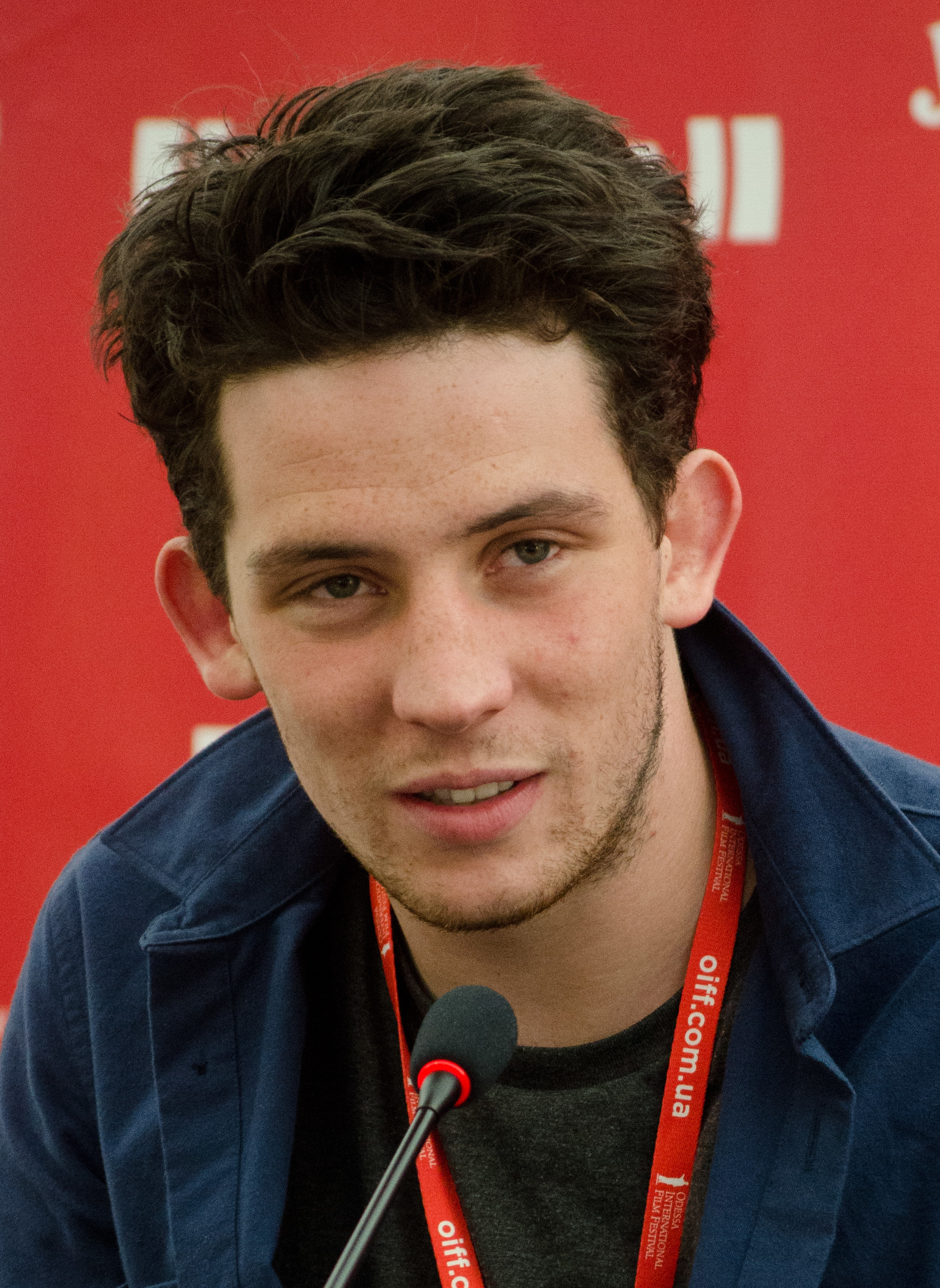
Josh O'Connor, 2021 winner for The Crown

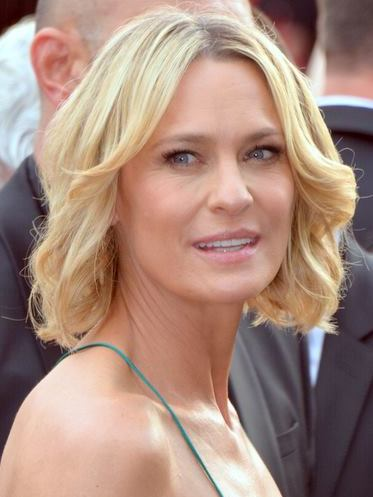
Robin Wright, 2014 winner for House of Cards

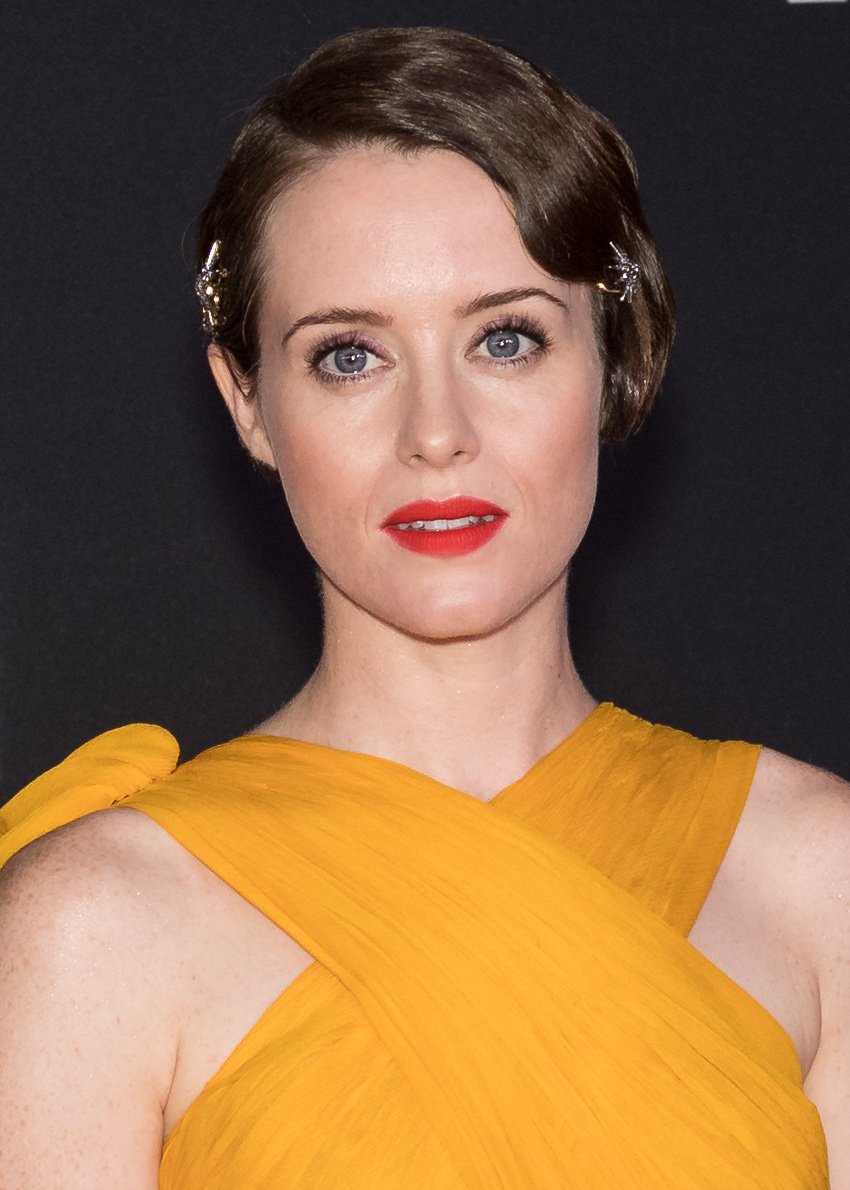
Claire Foy, 2017 winner for The Crown

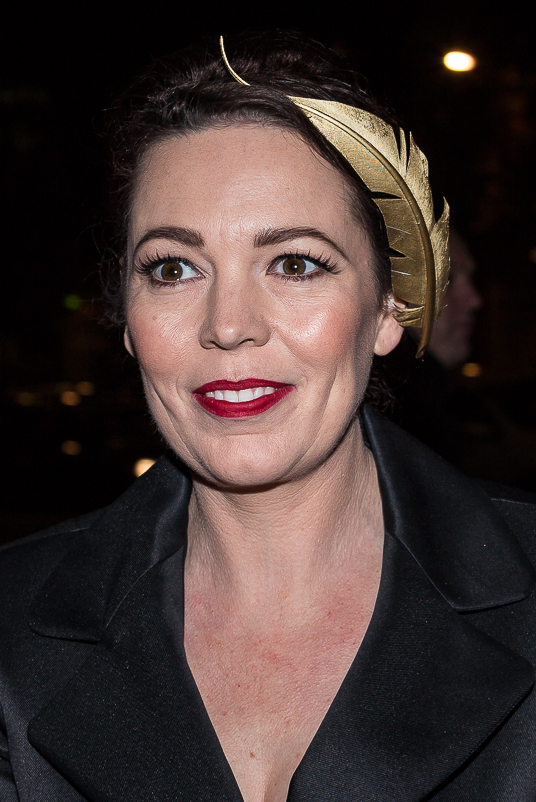
Olivia Colman, 2020 winner for The Crown

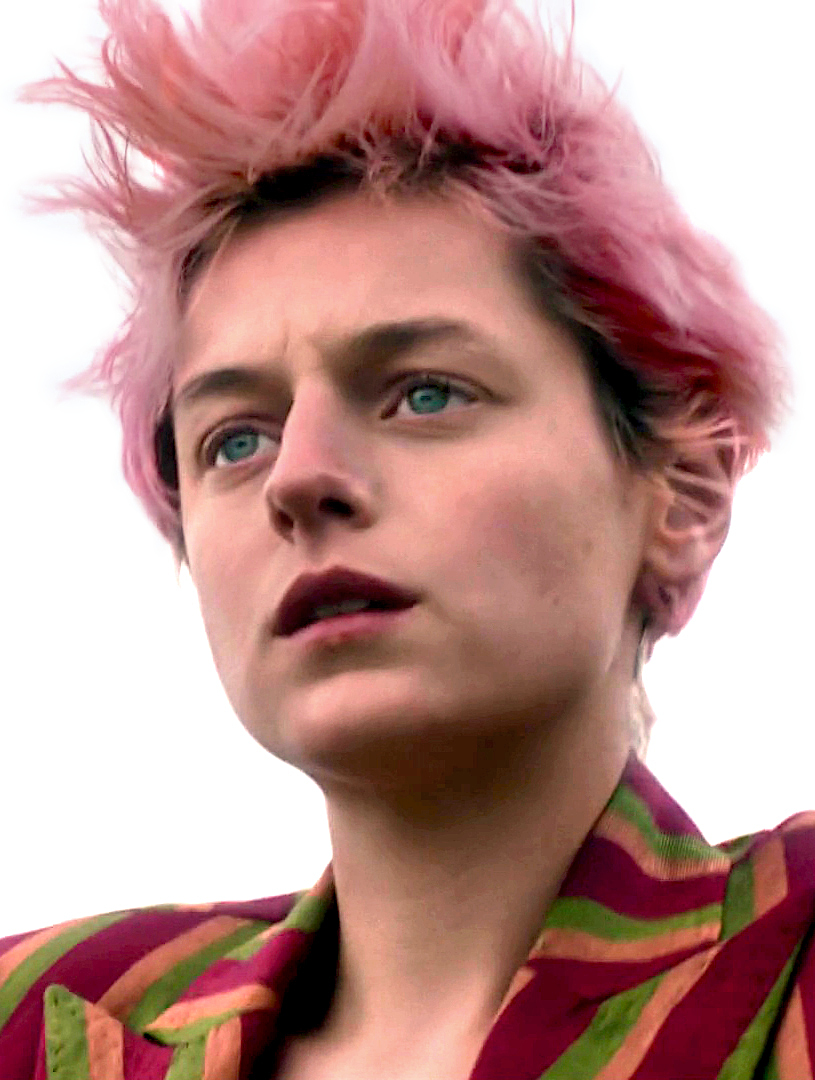
Emma Corrin, 2021 winner for The Crown

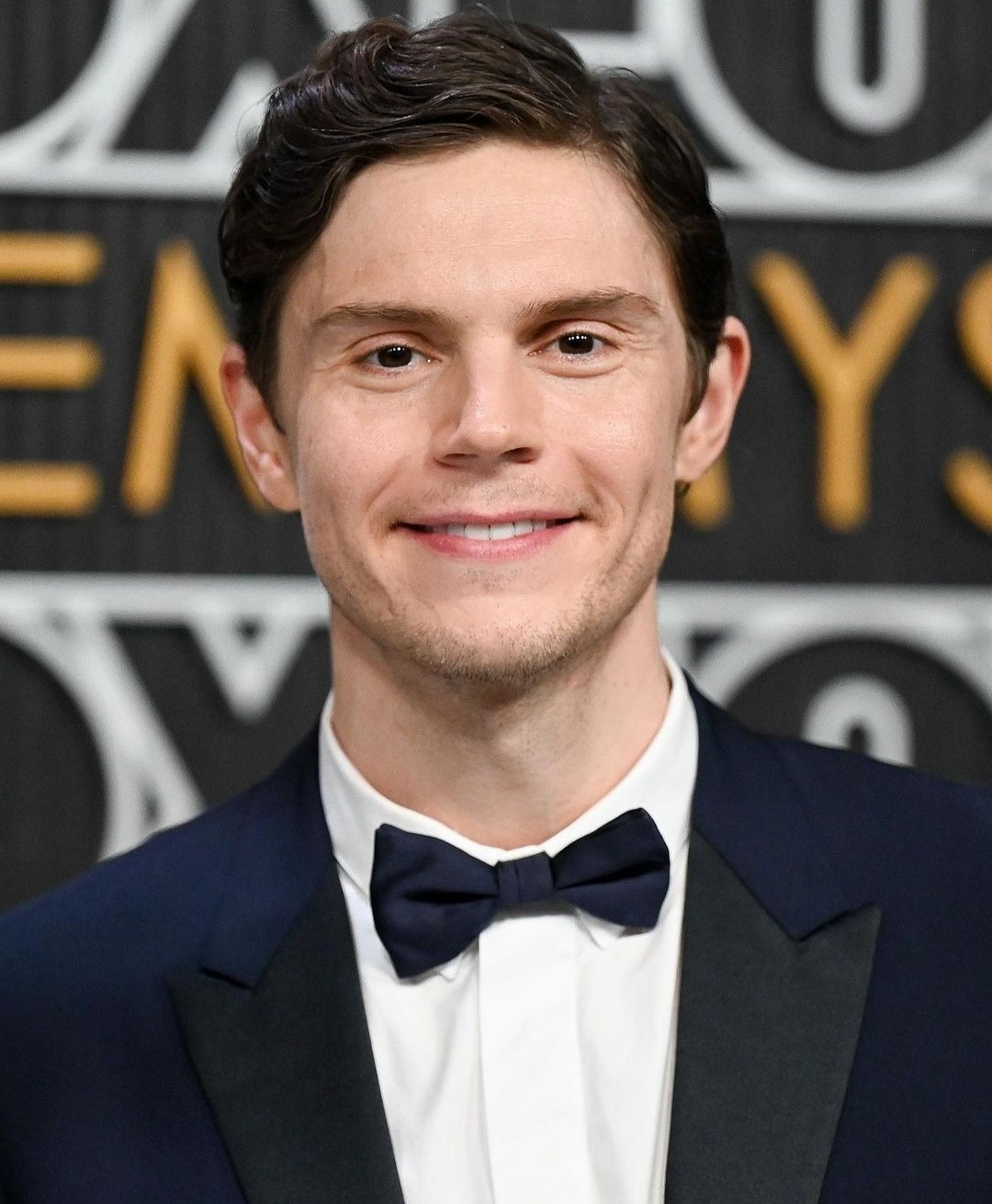
Evan Peters, 2023 winner for Monster

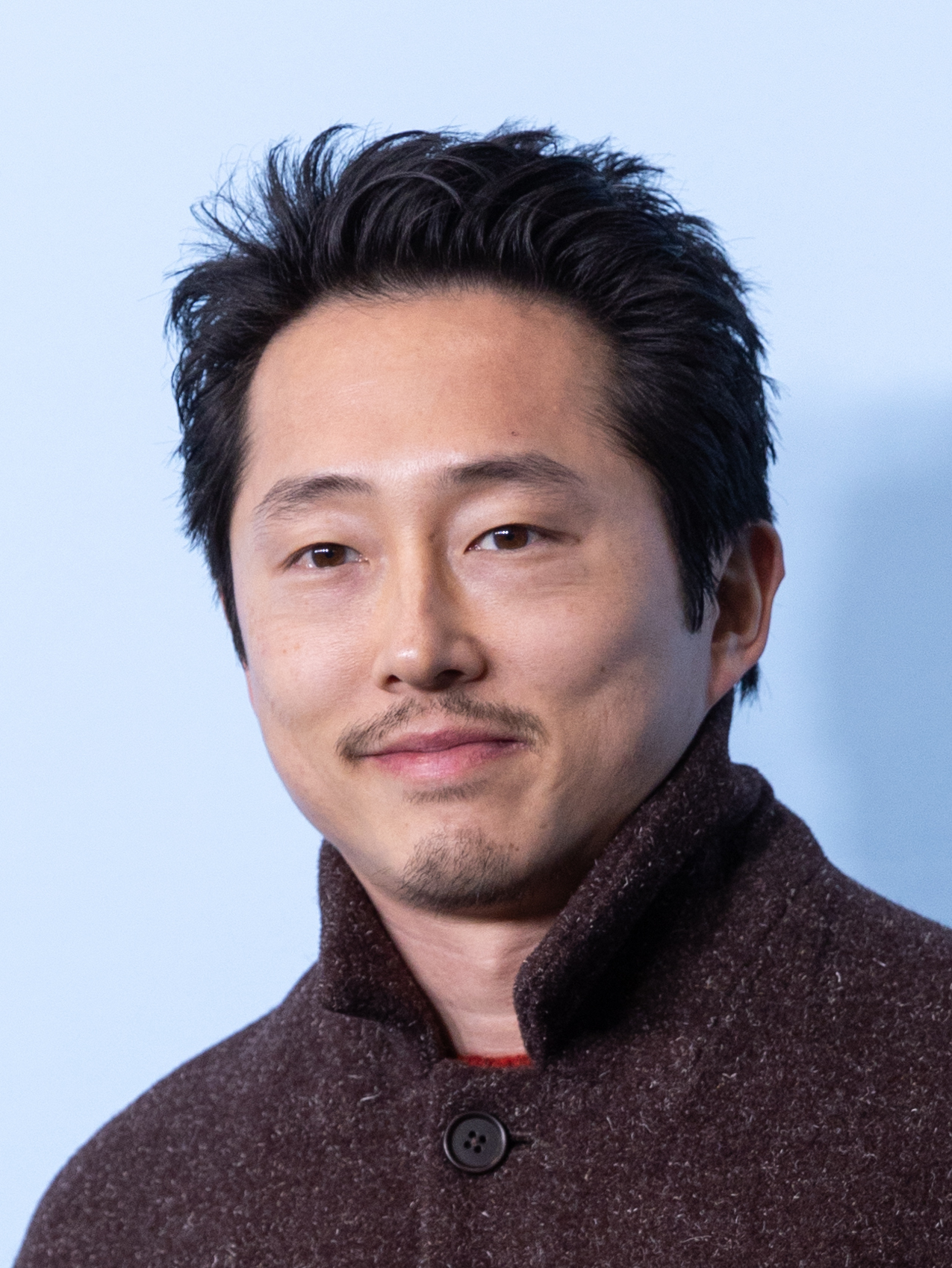
Steven Yeun, 2024 winner for Beef

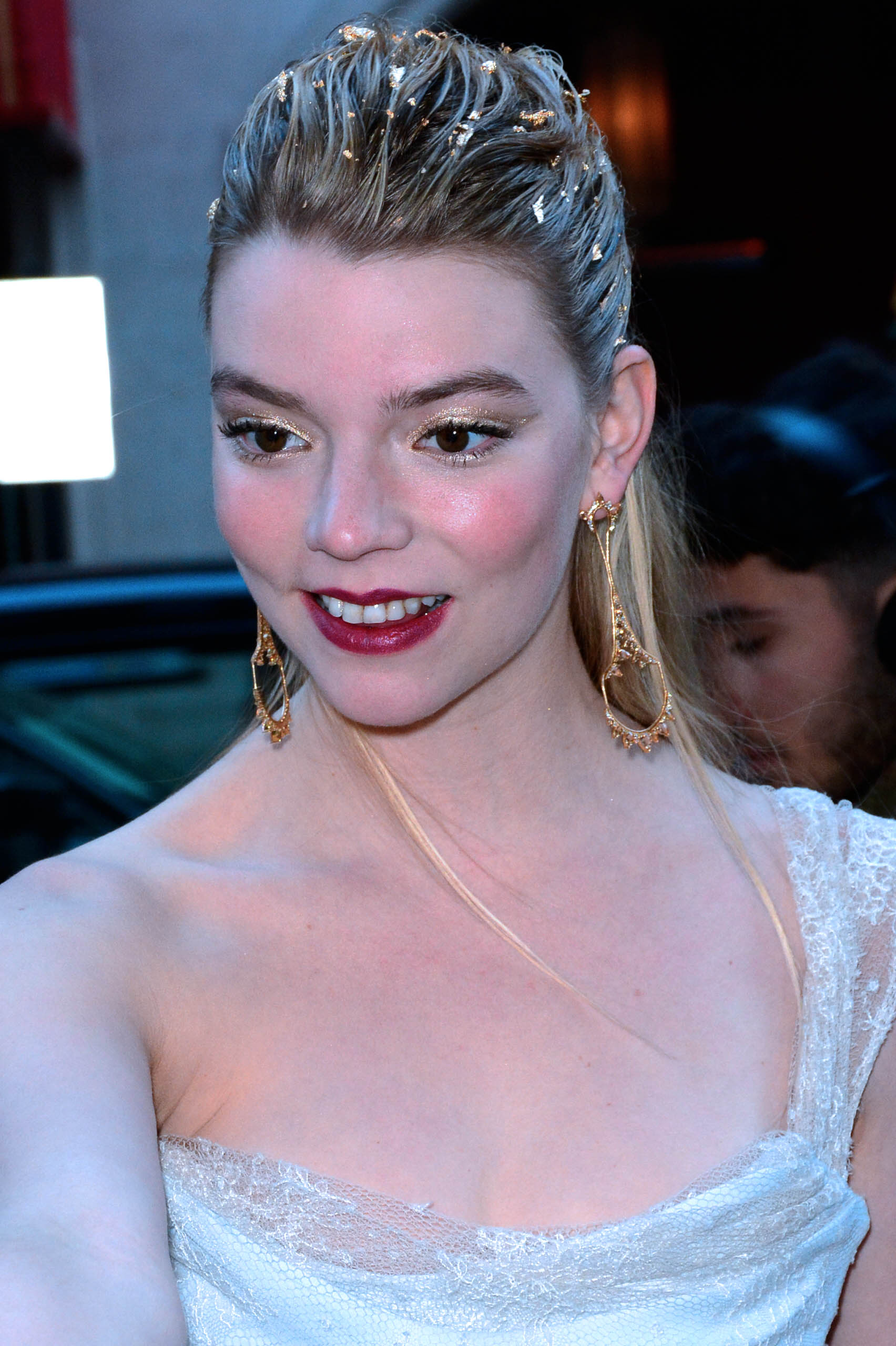
Anya Taylor-Joy, 2021 winner for The Queen's Gambit

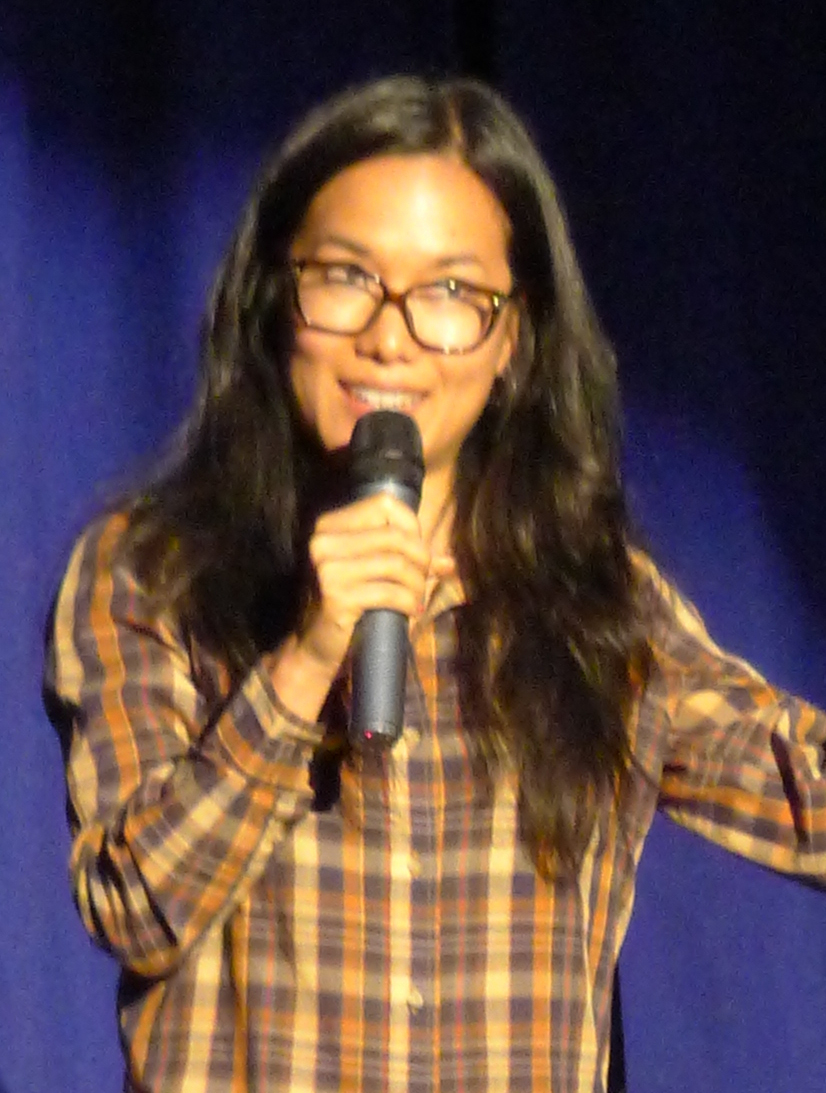
Ali Wong, 2024 winner for Beef

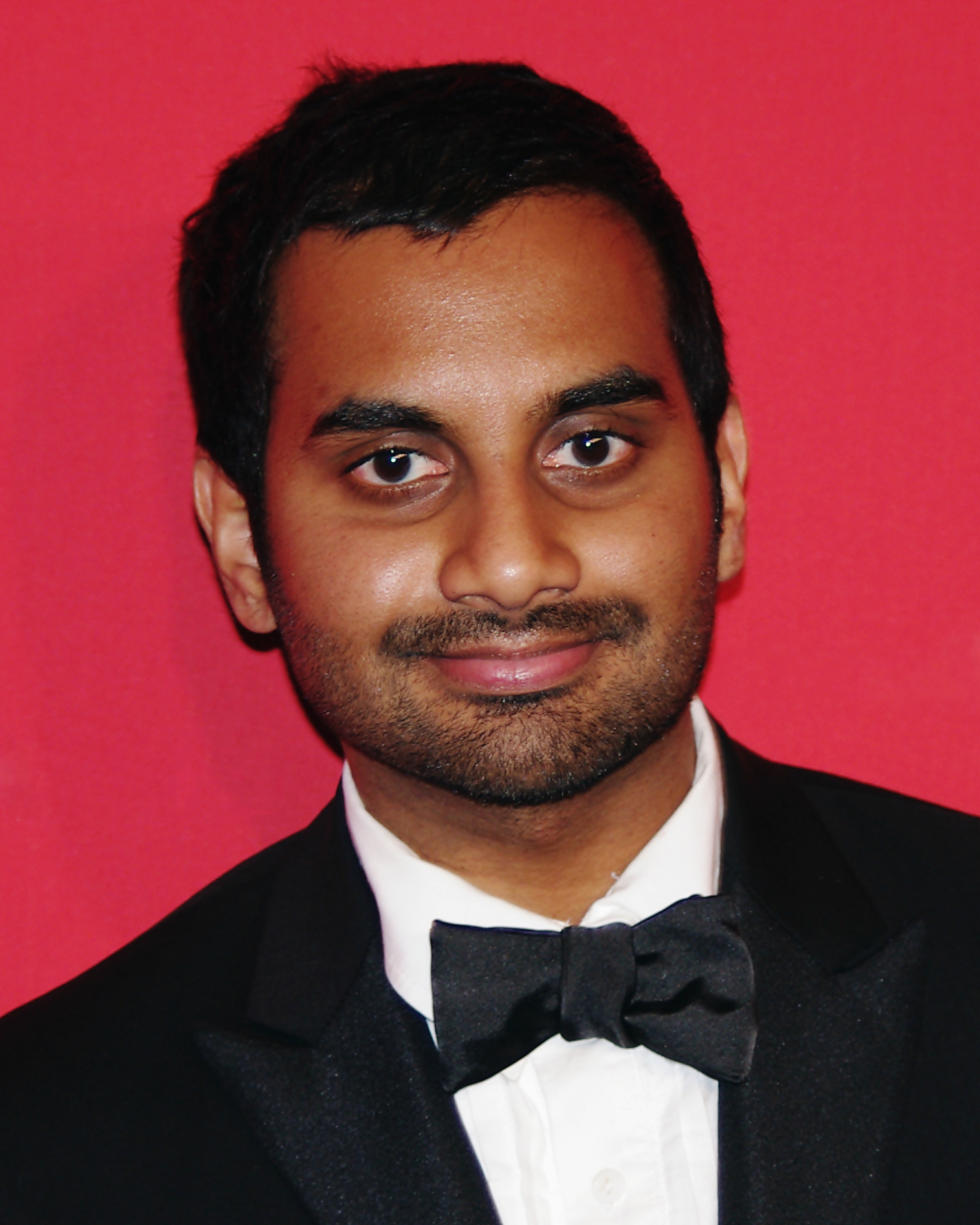
Aziz Ansari, 2018 winner for Master of None

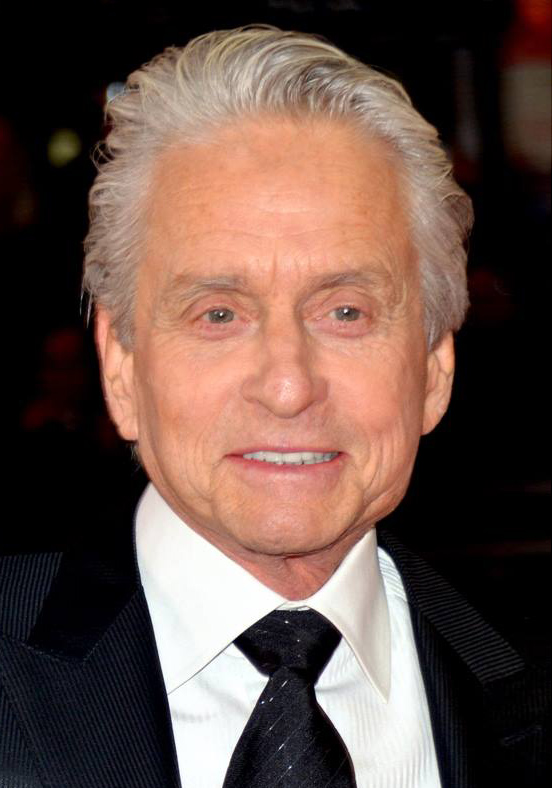
Michael Douglas, 2019 winner for The Kominsky Method

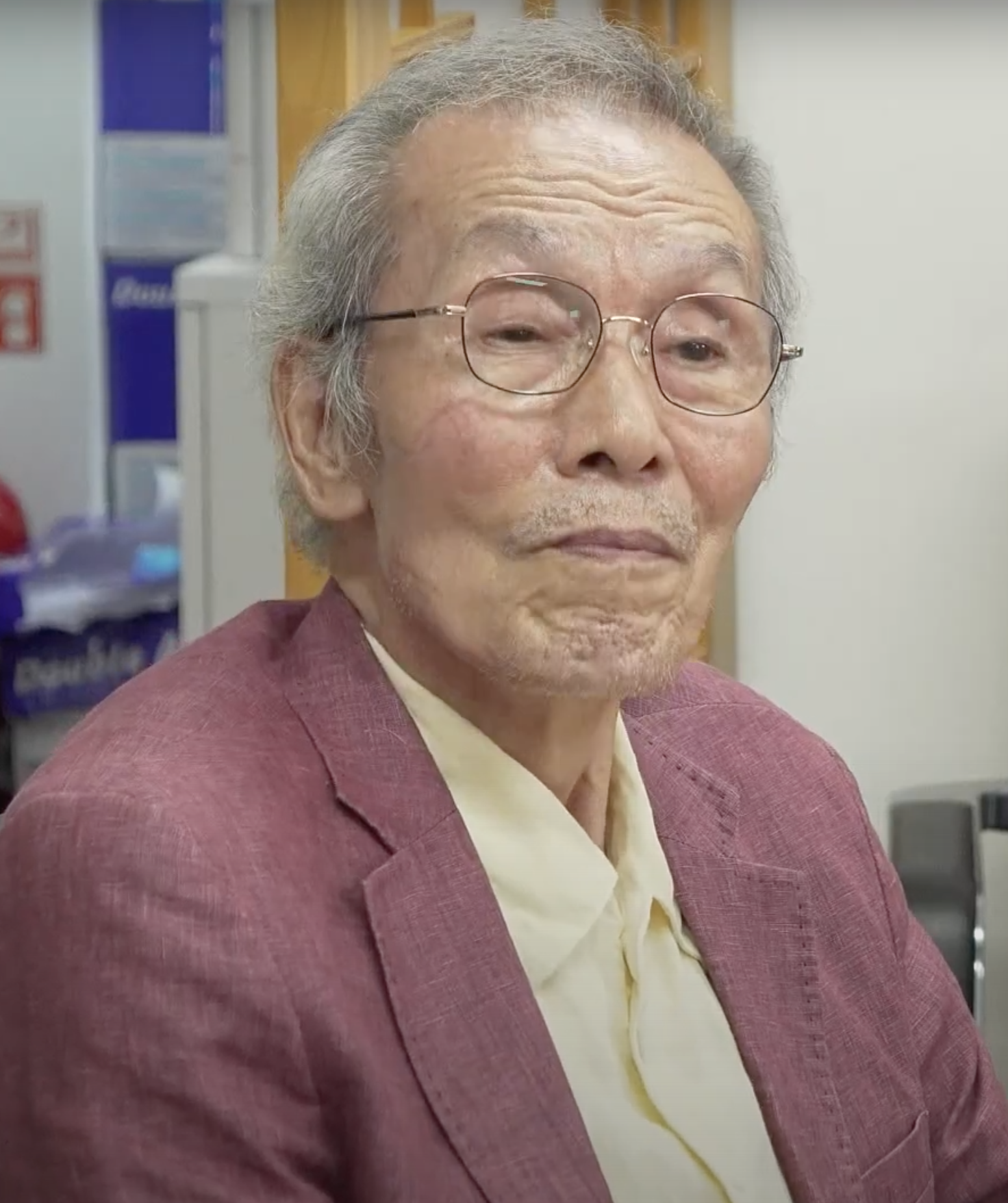
O Yeong-su, 2022 winner for Squid Game

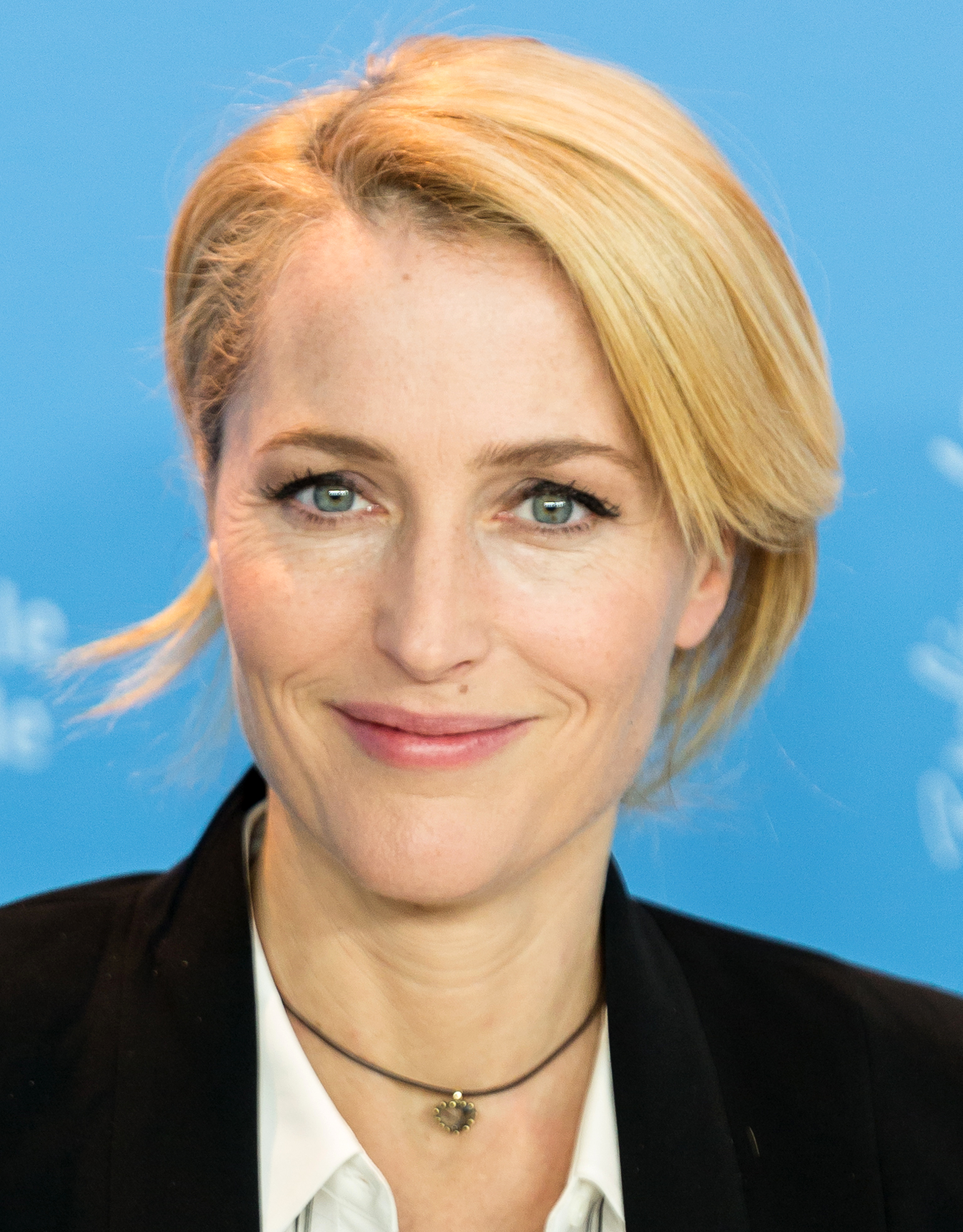
Gillian Anderson, 2021 winner for The Crown

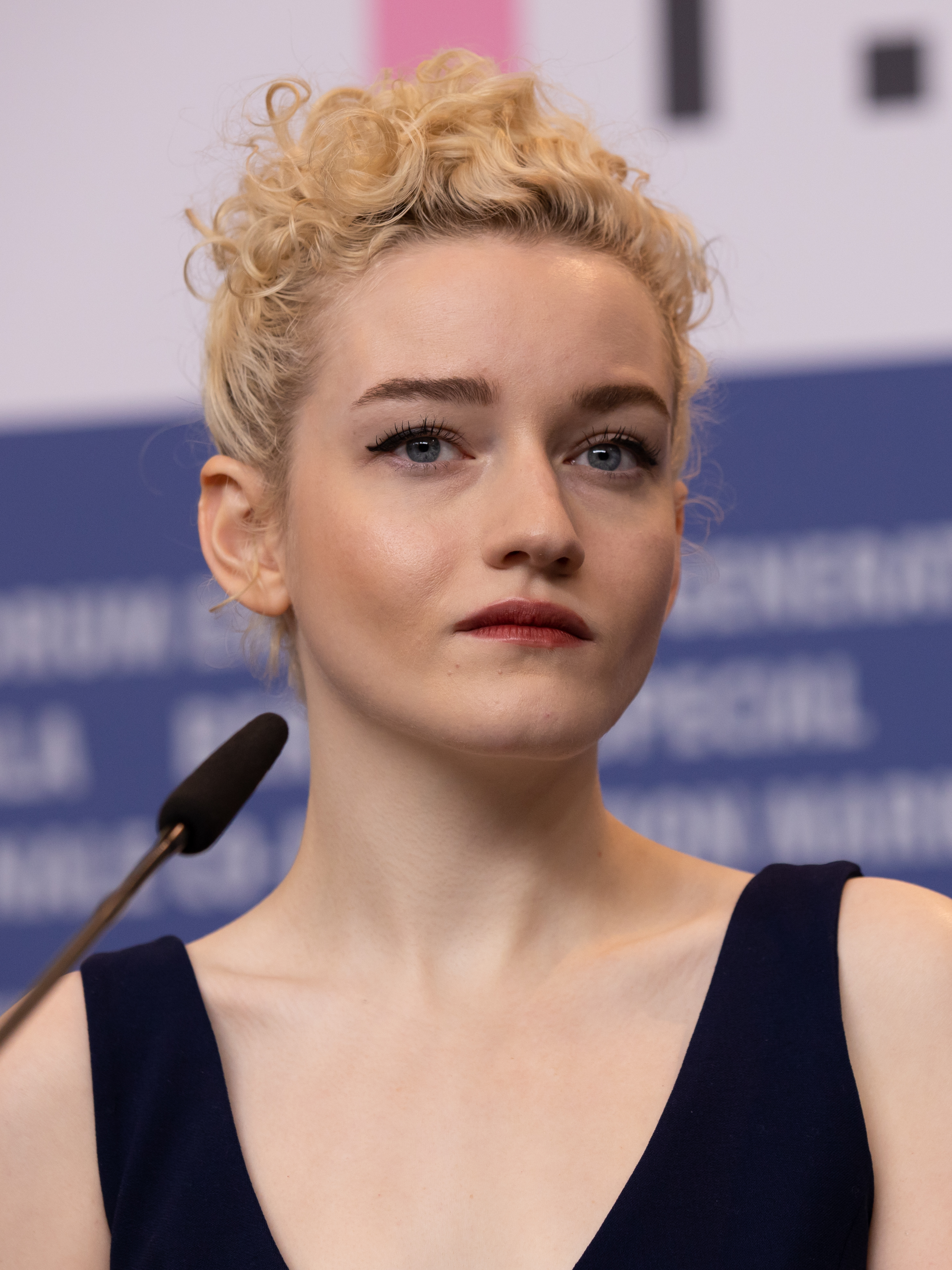
Julia Garner, 2023 winner for Ozark

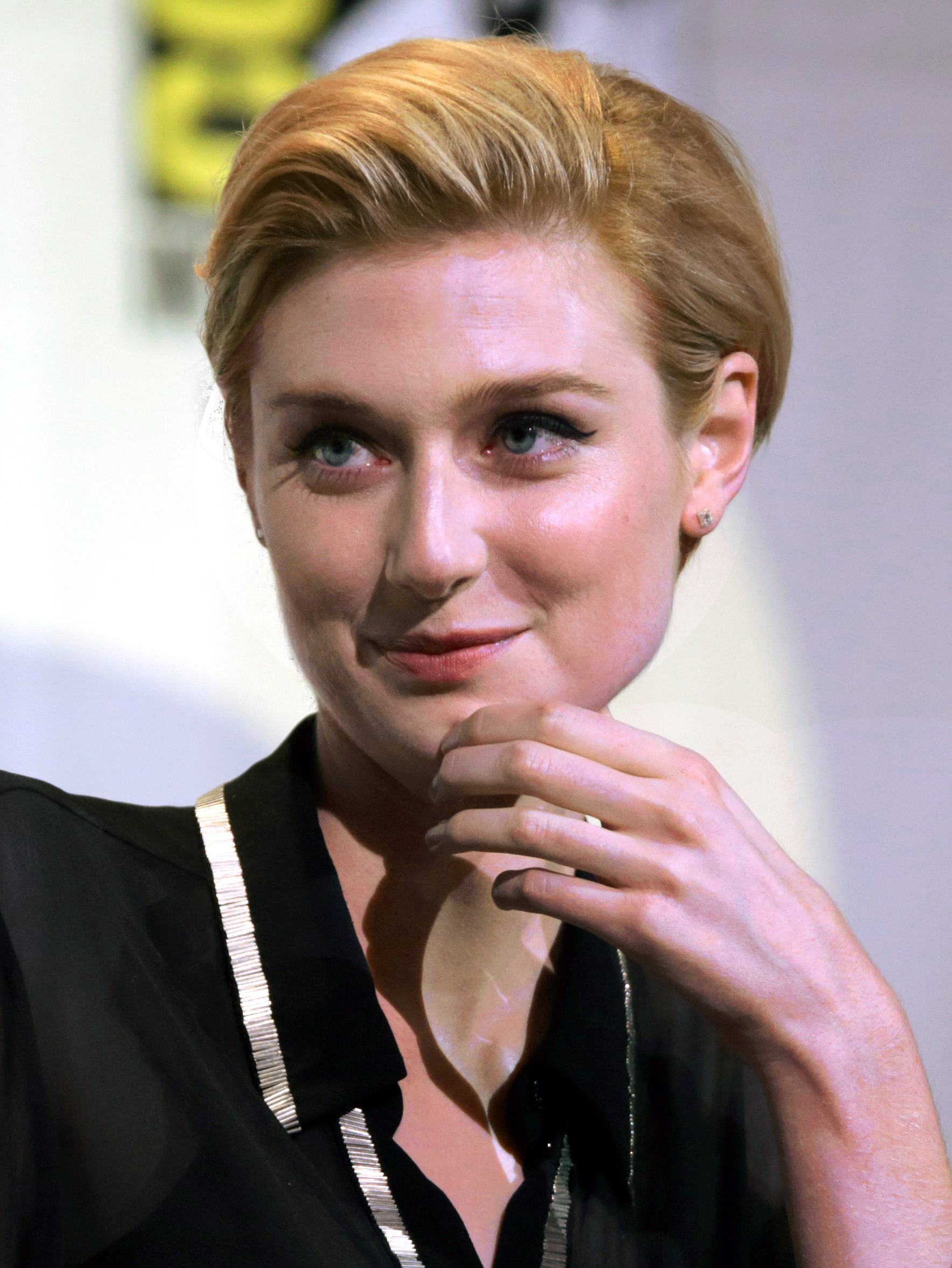
Elizabeth Debicki, 2024 winner for The Crown

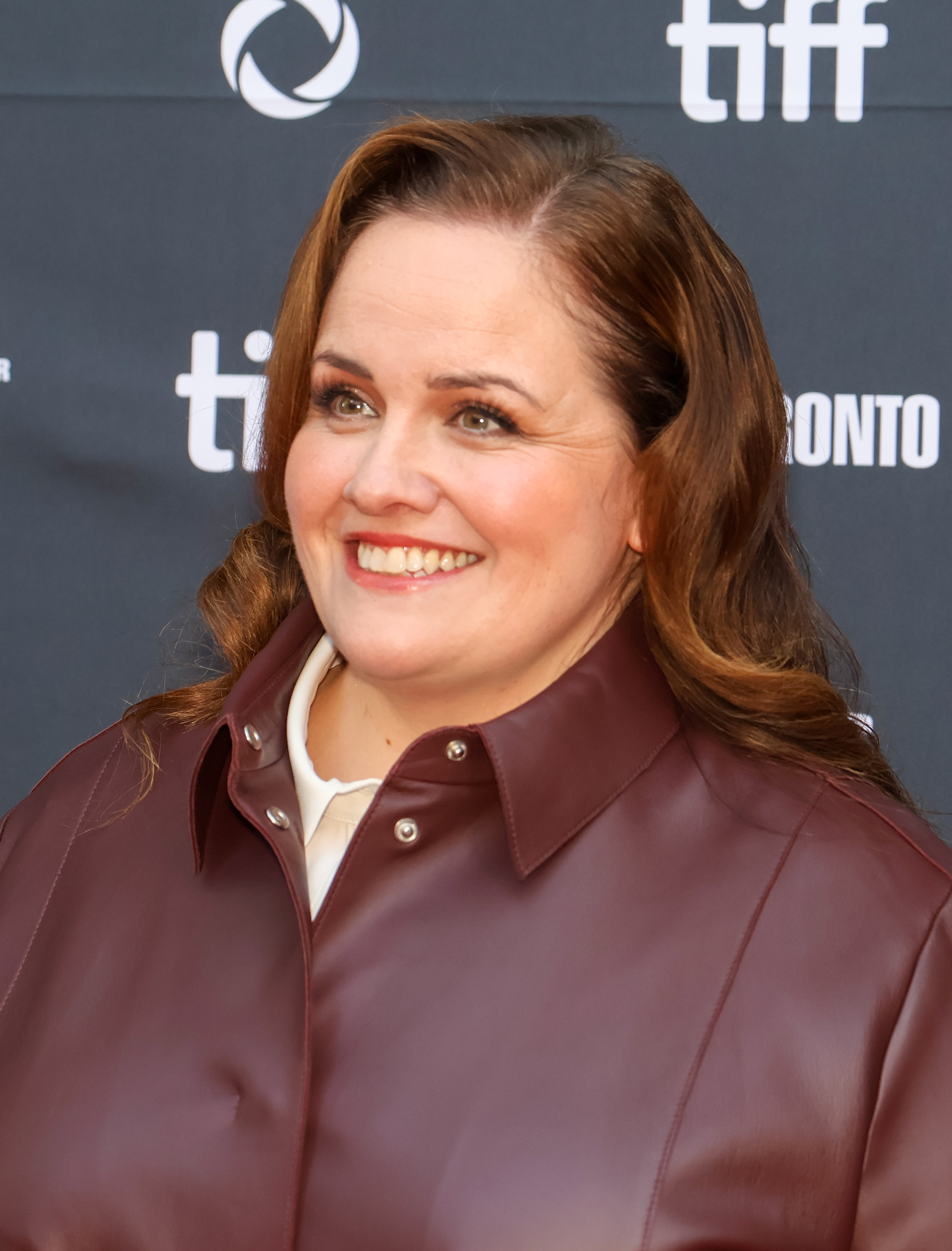
Jessica Gunning, 2025 winner for Baby Reindeer

=== Best Actor – Television Series Drama ===
Best Actor – Television Series Drama
Year	Nominee	Character	Series	Result	Ref.
2014	Kevin Spacey	Frank Underwood	House of Cards	Nominated	
2015	Kevin Spacey	Frank Underwood	House of Cards	Won	
2016	Wagner Moura	Pablo Escobar	Narcos	Nominated	
2018	Jason Bateman	Marty Byrde	Ozark	Nominated	
2019	Jason Bateman	Marty Byrde	Ozark	Nominated	
2019	Richard Madden	David Budd	Bodyguard	Won	
2020	Tobias Menzies	Prince Philip	The Crown	Nominated	
2021	Jason Bateman	Marty Byrde	Ozark	Nominated	
2021	Josh O'Connor	Prince Charles	The Crown	Won	
2022	Lee Jung-jae	Seong Gi-hun	Squid Game	Nominated	
2022	Omar Sy	Assane Diop	Lupin	Nominated	
2024	Dominic West	Charles, Prince of Wales	The Crown	Nominated	

=== Best Actress – Television Series Drama ===
Best Actress – Television Series Drama
Year	Nominee	Character	Series	Result	Ref.
2014	Robin Wright	Claire Underwood	House of Cards	Won	
2014	Taylor Schilling	Piper Chapman	Orange Is the New Black	Nominated	
2015	Robin Wright	Claire Underwood	House of Cards	Nominated	
2016	Robin Wright	Claire Underwood	House of Cards	Nominated	
2017	Claire Foy	Queen Elizabeth II	The Crown	Won	
2017	Winona Ryder	Joyce Byers	Stranger Things	Nominated	
2018	Claire Foy	Queen Elizabeth II	The Crown	Nominated	
2018	Katherine Langford	Hannah Baker	13 Reasons Why	Nominated	
2020	Olivia Colman	Queen Elizabeth II	The Crown	Won	
2021	Olivia Colman	Queen Elizabeth II	The Crown	Nominated	
2021	Emma Corrin	Princess Diana	The Crown	Won	
2021	Laura Linney	Wendy Byrde	Ozark	Nominated	
2021	Sarah Paulson	Nurse Mildred Ratched	Ratched	Nominated	
2023	Laura Linney	Wendy Byrde	Ozark	Nominated	
2023	Imelda Staunton	Queen Elizabeth II	The Crown	Nominated	
2024	Keri Russell	Katherine "Kate" Wyler	The Diplomat	Nominated	
2024	Imelda Staunton	Queen Elizabeth II	The Crown	Nominated	
2025	Keira Knightley	Helen Webb	Black Doves	Nominated	
2025	Keri Russell	Katherine "Kate" Wyler	The Diplomat	Nominated	
2026	Keri Russell	Katherine "Kate" Wyler	The Diplomat	Nominated	

=== Best Actor – Miniseries or Television Film ===
Best Actor – Miniseries or Television Film
Year	Nominee	Character	Program	Result	Ref.
2020	Sacha Baron Cohen	Eli Cohen / Kamel Amin Thaabet	The Spy	Nominated	
2022	Ewan McGregor	Roy Halston Frowick	Halston	Nominated	
2022	Tahar Rahim	Charles Sobhraj	The Serpent	Nominated	
2023	Evan Peters	Jeffrey Dahmer	Dahmer – Monster: The Jeffrey Dahmer Story	Won	
2024	Steven Yeun	Danny Cho	Beef	Won	
2025	Richard Gadd	Donny Dunn	Baby Reindeer	Nominated	
2025	Cooper Koch	Erik Menendez	Monsters: The Lyle and Erik Menendez Story	Nominated	
2025	Andrew Scott	Tom Ripley	Ripley	Nominated	
2026	Paul Giamatti	Phillip Connarty	Black Mirror	Nominated	
2026	Stephen Graham	Eddie Miller	Adolescence	Won	
2026	Charlie Hunnam	Ed Gein	Monster: The Ed Gein Story	Nominated	
2026	Jude Law	Jake Friedkin	Black Rabbit	Nominated	
2026	Matthew Rhys	Nile Jarvis	The Beast in Me	Nominated	

=== Best Actress – Miniseries or Television Film ===
Best Actress – Miniseries or Television Film
Year	Nominee	Character	Program	Result	Ref.
2019	Regina King	Latrice Butler	Seven Seconds	Nominated	
2020	Kaitlyn Dever	Marie Adler	Unbelievable	Nominated	
2020	Merritt Wever	Det. Karen Duvall	Unbelievable	Nominated	
2021	Shira Haas	Esther "Esty" Shapiro	Unorthodox	Nominated	
2021	Anya Taylor-Joy	Elizabeth "Beth" Harmon	The Queen's Gambit	Won	
2022	Margaret Qualley	Alex	Maid	Nominated	
2023	Julia Garner	Anna Delvey	Inventing Anna	Nominated	
2024	Ali Wong	Amy Lau	Beef	Won	
2025	Sofía Vergara	Griselda Blanco	Griselda	Nominated	
2026	Claire Danes	Agatha "Aggie" Wiggs	The Beast in Me	Nominated	
2026	Rashida Jones	Amanda Waters	Black Mirror	Nominated	

=== Best Actor – Television Series Musical or Comedy ===
Best Actor – Television Series Musical or Comedy
Year	Nominee	Character	Series	Result	Ref.
2014	Jason Bateman	Michael Bluth	Arrested Development	Nominated	
2015	Ricky Gervais	Derek Noakes	Derek	Nominated	
2016	Aziz Ansari	Dev Shah	Master of None	Nominated	
2018	Aziz Ansari	Dev Shah	Master of None	Won	
2019	Michael Douglas	Sandy Kominsky	The Kominsky Method	Won	
2020	Michael Douglas	Sandy Kominsky	The Kominsky Method	Nominated	
2020	Ben Platt	Payton Hobart	The Politician	Nominated	
2020	Paul Rudd	Miles Elliot	Living with Yourself	Nominated	
2025	Ted Danson	Charles Nieuwendyk	A Man on the Inside	Nominated	
2025	Adam Brody	Noah Roklov	Nobody Wants This	Nominated	
2026	Adam Brody	Noah Roklov	Nobody Wants This	Nominated	

=== Best Actress – Television Series Musical or Comedy ===
Best Actress – Television Series Musical or Comedy
Year	Nominee	Character	Series	Result	Ref.
2015	Taylor Schilling	Piper Chapman	Orange Is the New Black	Nominated	
2016	Lily Tomlin	Frankie Bergstein	Grace and Frankie	Nominated	
2018	Alison Brie	Ruth "Zoya the Destroya" Wilder	GLOW	Nominated	
2019	Alison Brie	Ruth "Zoya the Destroya" Wilder	GLOW	Nominated	
2020	Christina Applegate	Jen Harding	Dead to Me	Nominated	
2020	Natasha Lyonne	Nadia Vulvokov	Russian Doll	Nominated	
2021	Lily Collins	Emily Cooper	Emily in Paris	Nominated	
2023	Jenna Ortega	Wednesday Addams	Wednesday	Nominated	
2025	Kristen Bell	Joanne Williams	Nobody Wants This	Nominated	
2026	Kristen Bell	Joanne Williams	Nobody Wants This	Nominated	
2026	Jenna Ortega	Wednesday Addams	Wednesday	Nominated	

=== Best Supporting Actor – Series, Miniseries, or Television Film ===
Best Supporting Actor – Series, Miniseries, or Television Film
Year	Nominee	Character	Program	Result	Ref.
2014	Corey Stoll	Peter Russo	House of Cards	Nominated	
2016	Ben Mendelsohn	Danny Rayburn	Bloodline	Nominated	
2017	John Lithgow	Winston Churchill	The Crown	Nominated	
2018	David Harbour	Chief Jim Hopper	Stranger Things	Nominated	
2019	Alan Arkin	Norman Newlander	The Kominsky Method	Nominated	
2020	Alan Arkin	Norman Newlander	The Kominsky Method	Nominated	
2021	Jim Parsons	Henry Willson	Hollywood	Nominated	
2022	O Yeong-su	Oh Il-nam	Squid Game	Won	
2023	Jonathan Pryce	Prince Philip, Duke of Edinburgh	The Crown	Nominated	
2023	Richard Jenkins	Lionel Dahmer	Dahmer - Monster: The Jeffrey Dahmer Story	Nominated	
2025	Javier Bardem	José Menendez	Monsters: The Lyle and Erik Menendez Story	Nominated	
2026	Owen Cooper	Jamie Miller	Adolescence	Won	
2026	Ashley Walters	DI Luke Bascombe	Adolescence	Nominated	

=== Best Supporting Actress – Series, Miniseries, or Television Film ===
Best Supporting Actress – Series, Miniseries, or Television Film
Year	Nominee	Character	Program	Result	Ref.
2015	Uzo Aduba	Suzanne "Crazy Eyes" Warren	Orange Is the New Black	Nominated	
2016	Uzo Aduba	Suzanne "Crazy Eyes" Warren	Orange Is the New Black	Nominated	
2020	Helena Bonham Carter	Princess Margaret	The Crown	Nominated	
2020	Toni Collette	Det. Grace Rasmussen	Unbelievable	Nominated	
2021	Gillian Anderson	Margaret Thatcher	The Crown	Won	
2021	Helena Bonham Carter	Princess Margaret	The Crown	Nominated	
2021	Julia Garner	Ruth Langmore	Ozark	Nominated	
2021	Cynthia Nixon	Gwendolyn Briggs	Ratched	Nominated	
2022	Andie MacDowell	Paula	Maid	Nominated	
2023	Julia Garner	Ruth Langmore	Ozark	Won	
2023	Elizabeth Debicki	Diana, Princess of Wales	The Crown	Nominated	
2023	Niecy Nash	Glenda Cleveland	Dahmer – Monster: The Jeffrey Dahmer Story	Nominated	
2024	Elizabeth Debicki	Diana, Princess of Wales	The Crown	Won	
2025	Jessica Gunning	Martha Scott	Baby Reindeer	Won	
2025	Dakota Fanning	Marge Sherwood	Ripley	Nominated	
2025	Allison Janney	Grace Penn	The Diplomat	Nominated	
2026	Erin Doherty	Briony Ariston	Adolescence	Won	

=== Best Performance in Stand-Up Comedy on Television ===
Best Performance in Stand-Up Comedy on Television
Year	Nominee	Program	Result	Ref.
2024	Rickey Gervais	Ricky Gervais: Armageddon	Won	
2024	Trevor Noah	Trevor Noah: Where Was I	Nominated	
2024	Chris Rock	Chris Rock: Selective Outrage	Nominated	
2024	Amy Schumer	Amy Schumer: Emergency Contact	Nominated	
2024	Wanda Sykes	Wanda Sykes: I'm an Entertainer	Nominated	
2025	Ali Wong	Ali Wong: Single Lady	Won	
2025	Jamie Foxx	Jamie Foxx: What Had Happened Was...	Nominated	
2025	Adam Sandler	Adam Sandler: Love You	Nominated	
2026	Ricky Gervais	Ricky Gervais: Mortality	Won	
2026	Kevin Hart	Kevin Hart: Acting My Age	Nominated	
2026	Sarah Silverman	Sarah Silverman: PostMortem	Nominated	

== Music ==
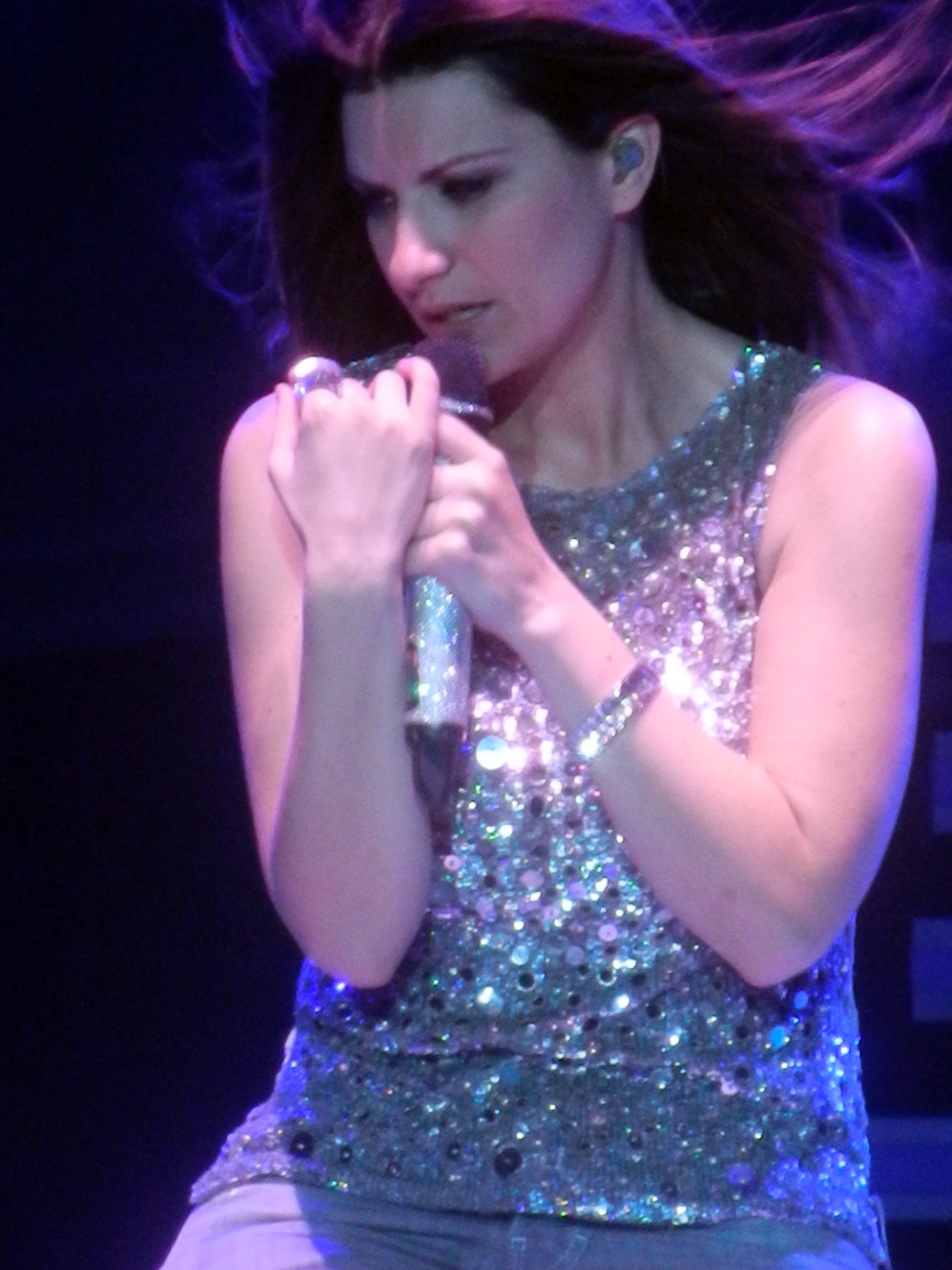
Laura Pausini, 2021 winner for The Life Ahead

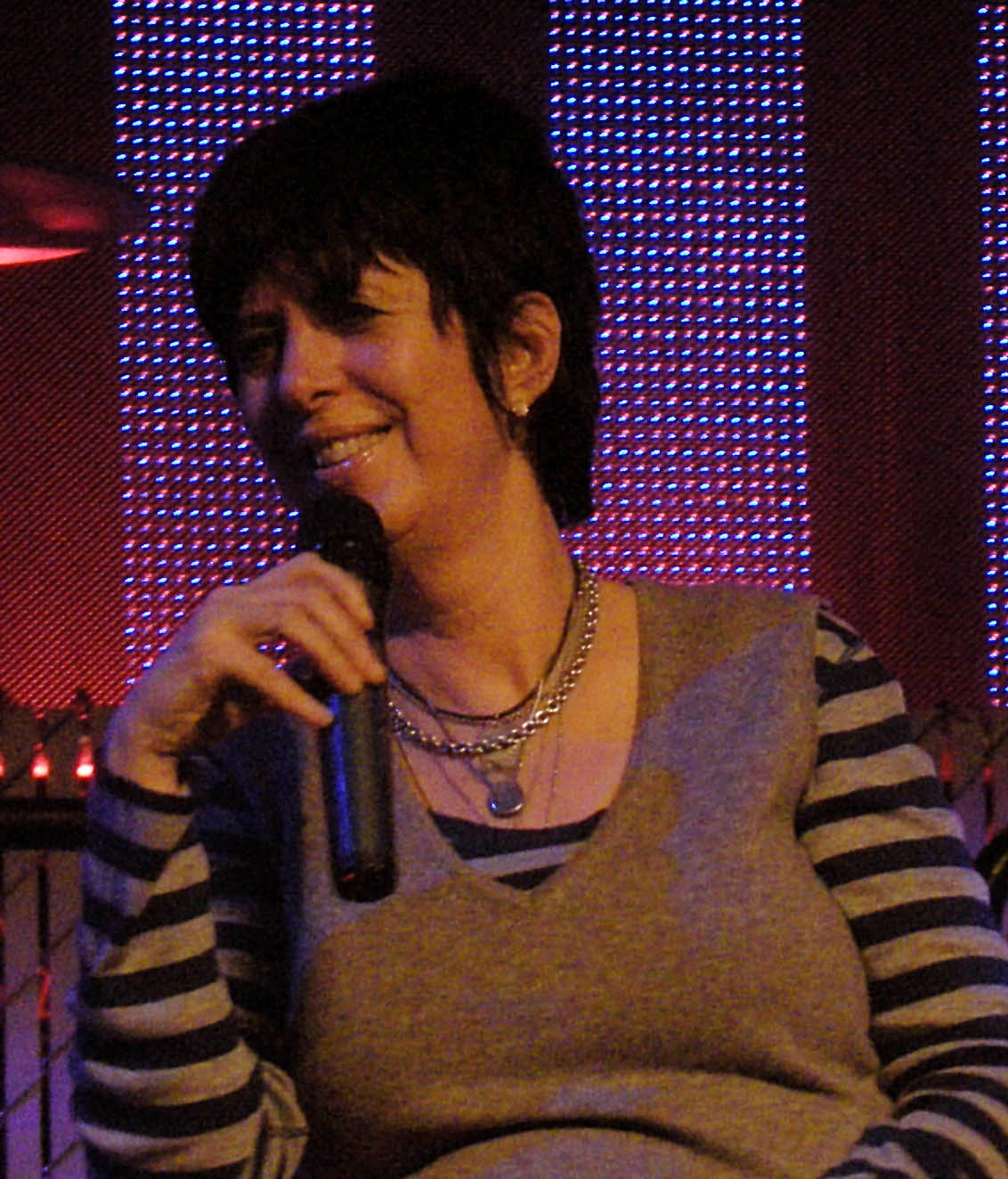
Diane Warren, 2021 winner for The Life Ahead

=== Best Original Song ===
Best Original Song
Year	Nominee(s)	Song	Film	Result	Ref.
2018	Mary J. Blige, Raphael Saadiq, and Taura Stinson	"Mighty River"	Mudbound	Nominated	
2021	Niccolò Agliardi, Laura Pausini, and Diane Warren	"Io sì (Seen)"	The Life Ahead	Won	
2021	Daniel Pemberton and Celeste Waite	"Hear My Voice"	The Trial of the Chicago 7	Nominated	
2023	Alexandre Desplat, Roeban Katz & Guillermo del Toro	"Ciao Papa"	Guillermo del Toro's Pinocchio	Nominated	
2024	Lenny Kravitz	"Road to Freedom"	Rustin	Nominated	
2025	Clément Ducol, Camille & Jacques Audiard	"El Mal"	Emilia Pérez	Won	
2025	Clément Ducol & Camille	"Mi Camino"	Emilia Pérez	Nominated	
2026	Ejae, Mark Sonnenblick, Ido, 24, & Teddy Park	"Golden"	KPop Demon Hunters	Won	
2026	Nick Cave & Bryce Dessner	"Train Dreams"	Train Dreams	Nominated	

=== Best Original Score ===
Best Original Score
Year	Nominee	Film	Result	Ref.
2020	Randy Newman	Marriage Story	Nominated	
2021	Alexandre Desplat	The Midnight Sky	Nominated	
2021	James Newton Howard	News of the World	Nominated	
2021	Trent Reznor and Atticus Ross	Mank	Nominated	
2022	Jonny Greenwood	The Power of the Dog	Nominated	
2023	Alexandre Desplat	Guillermo del Toro's Pinocchio	Nominated	
2025	Clément Ducol & Camille	Emilia Pérez	Nominated	
2026	Alexandre Desplat	Frankenstein	Nominated	

== See also ==
Main

- List of accolades received by Netflix

Others

- List of TCA Awards received by Netflix
- List of BAFTA Awards received by Netflix
- List of Daytime Emmy Awards received by Netflix
- List of Primetime Emmy Awards received by Netflix
- List of Screen Actors Guild Awards received by Netflix
- List of Critics' Choice Television Awards received by Netflix
- List of Primetime Creative Arts Emmy Awards received by Netflix
