= Gary Gilbert =

American film producer

- Born: 1965 (age 60–61); Detroit, Michigan, U.S.
- Education: University of Michigan (BBA)
- Occupations: Film producer, Co-founder of Rocket Mortgage
- Known for: co-founder of Rocket Mortgage co-owner of Cleveland Cavaliers
- Family: Dan Gilbert (brother)

Gary Gilbert (born 1965) is an Academy Award nominated film producer and businessman. He is the founder and CEO of Gilbert Films, a media production and financing company based in Los Angeles, California. He is also a co-founder of Rocket Mortgage, as well as a co-owner of the Cleveland Cavaliers NBA team along with his brother, Dan Gilbert.

== Biography ==
Gilbert was born in 1965 to a Jewish family and received a business administration degree (BBA) from the University of Michigan's Ross School of Business.

Gilbert was one of the producers of La La Land (2016), which matched the record of 14 Academy Award nominations. Gilbert began his career when he financed and produced the 2004 feature film Garden State starring Zach Braff and Natalie Portman. In 2005, Gilbert, along with Braff, won an Independent Spirit Award for Best First Feature Film. In 2010, Gilbert produced The Kids Are All Right, which after premiering at the Sundance Film Festival was acquired by Focus Features (Universal Studios). The film was nominated for four Academy Awards, and won two Golden Globes in 2011. Gilbert also produced Are You Here, starring Owen Wilson, Zach Galifianakis and Amy Poehler.

Gilbert is also a co-owner of the National Basketball Association team the Cleveland Cavaliers, along with Usher and his brother, Dan Gilbert, chairman of Quicken Loans. Gilbert founded Rock Financial in 1985 with his older brother Dan, Ron Berman and Lindsay Gross. After a series of mergers, the company, through Quicken Loans, has become the nation's largest mortgage lender.

== Partial filmography as producer ==
- 2020: If Anything Happens I Love You
- 2016: La La Land
- 2011: Margaret
- 2011: From Prada to Nada
- 2010: The Kids Are All Right
- 2004: Garden State
