= If Anything Happens I Love You =

2020 short film by Will McCormack and Michael Govier

- Promotional release poster
- Directed by: Will McCormack; Michael Govier
- Written by: Will McCormack; Michael Govier
- Produced by: Maryann Garger; Gary Gilbert; Gerald Chamales; Michael Govier
- Edited by: Peter Ettinger
- Music by: Lindsay Marcus
- Production companies: Gilbert Films; Oh Good Productions
- Distributed by: Netflix
- Release date: November 20, 2020
- Running time: 12 minutes
- Country: United States
- Language: English

If Anything Happens I Love You is an American 2D animated short film written and directed by Will McCormack and Michael Govier (in their directorial debut). Its story follows two grieving parents as they struggle to confront the death of their daughter, who was killed in a school shooting. Produced by Gilbert Films and Oh Good Productions, the film was released on Netflix on November 20, 2020.

The initial idea for the film came from a meeting between McCormack and Govier at Griffith Park. The pair later wrote the script for the film over a year, with production beginning in 2018 and Youngran Nho serving as animating director. Using the short film Father and Daughter as inspiration and working closely with Everytown for Gun Safety, production concluded in February 2020.

If Anything Happens I Love You was revealed on March 4, 2020, during a private screening at the United Talent Agency in Beverly Hills, where it was presented by Jayme Lemons, Chelsea Handler, Phil Johnston, Mary McCormack, Rashida Jones, and executive producer Laura Dern. Following its release on Netflix, the short was met with critical acclaim; at the 93rd Academy Awards, it won Best Animated Short Film.

== Plot ==
Two parents begin to grow separated from one another following the death of their 12-year-old daughter. Though they refuse to speak to one another in person, both parents are watched over by shadows expressing their true emotions. While the father goes outside, the mother thinks about entering her daughter's old bedroom, though she stops herself due to overpowering grief and sadness.

While doing laundry, the mother begins to cry after realizing she has washed her daughter's shirt. She sits near the washing machine, causing a soccer ball to fall and open her daughter's bedroom, which also rolls onto a record player, playing the song "1950". The mother decides to enter the room, where she later reunites with her husband. While "1950" continues to play in the background, a shadow representing their daughter pops out of the record player, and the parents begin to remember events in their daughter's life.

In a series of flashbacks, the parents see their daughter grow up: developing a love for soccer, celebrating her 10th birthday, and experiencing her first kiss. In the final flashback, the daughter leaves her parents to attend school. Knowing what is about to happen, the shadows of the parents attempt to stop her from entering the premises, but, this being a memory, they fail. Inside the school, the daughter is shot and killed during a school shooting, with her final text to her parents being "If anything happens I love you". (Note: This message was found to be similar to that of survivors and victims of the Stoneman Douglas High School shooting, who texted their parents while the shooting was taking place.)

As the shadows of the parents grow apart, the shadow of the daughter brings them together, forcing the real parents to see the good memories they experienced with their daughter when she was alive. In the present, the parents hug, and the daughter's shadow becomes a bright light between the shadows of her grieving parents.

== Production ==
According to writers Will McCormack and Michael Govier, who became friends at an acting school, the initial idea for the film came from a meeting between the two at Griffith Park, where Govier thought about making a film where shadows represented emotions people could not reach. McCormack agreed, opining it is a "powerful" premise. The goal of the film was to show "the grief that still lingers on in the community, even though maybe the news cycle has left them, and what that grief looks like." To direct the film, the pair met with several parents who had lost their children to school shootings and gun violence in the United States, aware of the sensitive subject matter. The pair also worked closely with Everytown for Gun Safety and Moms Demand Action, allowing the organizations to share their own feedback on the film's script and amplify its overall theme.

From the very beginning it was always going to be an animated film. We just thought a live-action version of this would be way too intense. We thought animation was the perfect gateway to have these deep conversations about loss and grief.

— Govier on deciding to expand the project into an animated film

To bring out their self-funded idea as an animated film, the pair first met with producer Maryann Garger. Soon after, If Anything Happens I Love You began production in late 2018, with animation taking place from April 2019 to the December of that same year. In total, twenty-eight people worked on the short film, including Youngran Nho, Haein Michelle Heo, and Julia Gomes Rodrigues, who used TVPaint Animation to animate the project. Production concluded in February 2021. To address the importance of diversity and representation in animation, the short was animated, composed, and lead-produced by an all-female crew.

The film was produced by Govier, who wrote the 12-page script for the short film with McCormack in a year. Shortly after, Nho was hired while she was attending the California Institute of the Arts to work as an animator and artistic director on the short, having been recommended by professor Maija Burnett, using the black-and-white palette from the Academy Award-winning short film Father and Daughter as inspiration. According to Nho, the film's background consisted of watercolor on paper to make the story feel "raw" and "unfinished," mentioning that the film attempted to have minimum color in its background to match the "emptiness that fills [the] grieving parents."

According to McCormack and Govier, the pair wanted to tell a story through anthropomorphic shadows, and as a result, multiple sequences were not drawn with "full technicolor" as they wanted to "illustrate and explore grief" in the short film. To keep in touch with Nho and the rest of the crew, McCormack and Govier used the software Slack to communicate, "critiquing and confirming each other's work in real-time."

Most of the film's score was composed by Lindsay Marcus, with the "Beautiful Dreamer" sequence of the film being arranged and performed by the Inner-City Youth Orchestra of LA run by Charles Dickerson. In an interview for Animation Scoop, McCormack revealed that the song "1950" was chosen for the film because the pair were listening to it while searching for music for the short. Also produced by Gary Gilbert and Gerald Chamales, the film was edited by Peter Ettinger on Adobe Premiere Pro.

== Release and reception ==
If Anything Happens I Love You was first shown in a private screening at the United Talent Agency in Beverly Hills on March 4, 2020, where it was presented by Laura Dern, Jayme Lemons, Chelsea Handler, Phil Johnston, Mary McCormack, and Rashida Jones. On October 14, 2020, Netflix acquired the distribution rights to the short film, which they released on their platform the following month on November 20.

=== Critical response ===
On review aggregator Rotten Tomatoes, the film holds an approval rating of 100% based on eight critic reviews, with an average rating of 7.5/10.

In his review for The Independent Critic, Richard Propes gave the short film a grade rating of an A+ (also giving it four stars out of five), praising its message, animation, and characters, and calling the film "an animated masterpiece." Writing for The Montclarion, Megan Lim lauded the film's simplicity, stating that "The elimination of words, color, and polished illustration [...] dramatically communicates the anguish and void that no dialogue could ever capture." After watching the short, the crew at Decider recommended viewers to watch the film, with Anna Menta calling the short "a beautiful but excruciatingly painful portrait of a tragedy", saying it was honest and felt like a true story.

On TikTok, #IfAnythingHappensILoveYou went viral shortly after the film's release, with content creators sharing their reactions prior to and after watching the 12-minute short.

=== Accolades ===
On October 14, 2020, IndieWire revealed that Netflix had been considering If Anything Happens I Love You as one of its three contenders for the Academy Award for Best Animated Short Film to compete at the 93rd Academy Awards. In February 2021, the film was added to a shortlist of 10 films competing for the award out of 96 qualifying animated films, becoming the only Netflix film in the shortlist. In March, the film received the official Academy Award nomination alongside Burrow, Genius Loci, Opera, and Yes-People, with IndieWire writing that as "Netflix's first short entry [...] the favorite will be If Anything Happens I Love You but this is one of the most unpredictable categories."

Awards and nominations received by If Anything Happens I Love You
Award	Date of ceremony	Category	Recipient(s)	Result	Ref.
Academy Awards	April 25, 2021	Best Animated Short Film	Will McCormack and Michael Govier	Won	
Annie Awards	April 16, 2021	Best Editorial – TV/Media	Peter Ettinger and Michael Babcock	Nominated	
