= Gerald Chamales =

American businessman

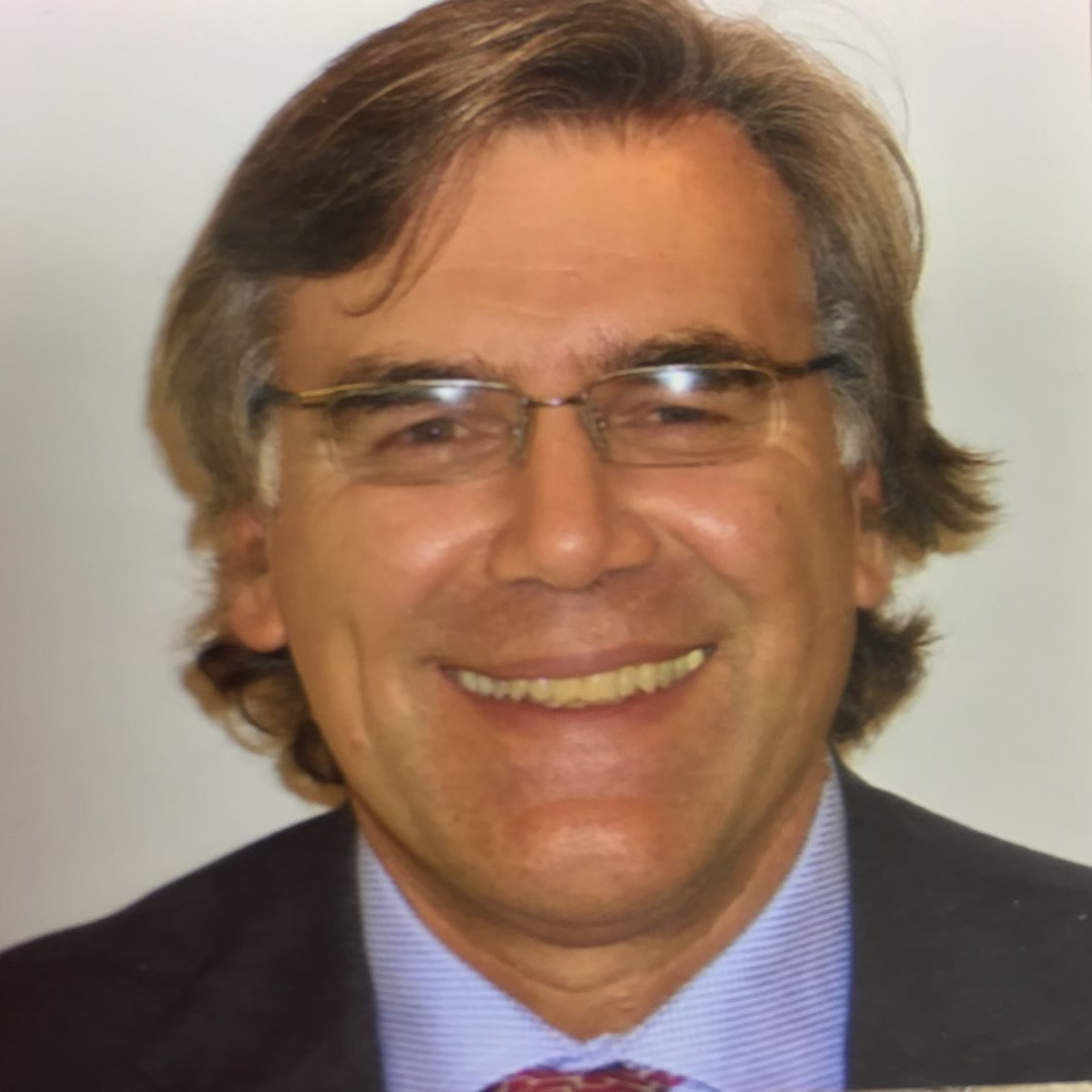
- Born: Gerald Chamales
- Occupations: Entrepreneur and philanthropist
- Known for: Founder of Rhinotek
- Spouse: Kathleen Chamales

Gerald "Jerry" Chamales is an American entrepreneur, film producer and philanthropist. Chamales was the founder of Rhinotek Computer Products, a revolutionary printer cartridge manufacturer and retailer. In 2001, he was awarded the Ernst & Young Entrepreneur of the Year Award for business service. Chamales has since forged a successful career in the film industry as a producer of The Irishman, which went on to garner 10 nominations at the 92nd Academy Awards. He also produced the acclaimed animated short If Anything Happens I Love You, which was named Best Animated Short Film at the 93rd Academy Awards.

In addition to his work in the tech industry and in film, Chamales is a noted philanthropist, with decades of experience helping those recovering from alcoholism and substance addiction. He has also been an active proponent of wildlife conservation in Kenya, particularly efforts to protect the black rhino.

== Early life ==
Chamales was born into a Greek family, and spent his early life in a foster home, before moving back in with his single mother. His father was Tom T. Chamales, a World War II veteran and celebrated author who wrote Never So Few in 1957, based on his real life experiences serving in wartime Burma. This was later adapted into a film starring Frank Sinatra and providing Steve McQueen with one of his earliest roles. Chamales began taking drugs and drinking as a teenager, which led to a period of addiction, failed treatment and homelessness. Chamales ultimately decided to turn his life around and turned to sobriety and his innovative idea for a fledgling tech company.

== Business career ==
In 1980, Chamales founded what is now known as Rhinotek Computer Products, a revolutionary printer cartridge company. Chamales founded the company in his Venice, California studio apartment, with only $7000 in his pocket, and paid himself only $200 per month in salary for the first 5 years. He even started the business on a card table, where he made his initial sales. In 1985, he moved the business venture into an office in Santa Monica, California and expanded again 2 years later by hiring 15 new employees. By taking business classes at UCLA and closely studying the industry, Chamales was able to turn the company to a rapidly growing business, and eventually built a manufacturing plant in Carson, California that included major production capabilities and two floors of call centers.

By 1998, Chamales had built what was then known as Omni Computer Products into a major force in the printer business, with 250 employees and $25.5 million in sales. That number would rise to $45 million by 2002. Omni was known for a cutting edge manufacturing approach and significant discount compared to their competitors. Omni's relatively small size and innovative strategy allowed it to undercut a printer cartridge market that had long been dominated by near-monopolies like Hewlett-Packard. When asked about this, Chamales stated that while there is nothing wrong with making a profit, "there is something wrong if you can sell something for $300 that costs you $30 to make and you are trying to drive out someone who's willing to sell it for $100." The company was also a major proponent of cartridge recycling, a precursor to later key conservation efforts by Chamales.

Chamales also became widely acclaimed for his progressive management style and willingness to help his employees, which included loans for personal troubles and a robust mentorship program. His management style has been covered in The Wall Street Journal, who observed that Chamales had "learned to tap into employees' passions and strengths, and get the best out of them." He has spoken openly about the early days of his career when his management style was "dictatorial", and strives to build encouraging, positive environments at his companies with a focus on helping those who need it. To that end, Chamales also created a revolutionary hiring policy, particularly in his call centers, which gave second chances to employees recovering from substance addiction and ultimately proved successful for both the employees and the sales culture at Omni. The approach of Chamales, offering work and career advancement as both a respite and therapy to those in need, has been widely acclaimed and contributed to numerous awards for Chamales and Rhinotek. Chamales sold Rhinotek to a private equity firm in 2006. He has since founded Equity Value Group, a company specializing in investments and philanthropic causes.

== Film and television ==
In 2010, Chamales received his first film credit, serving as a producer for the feature-length documentary film Something's Gonna Live, which traced the history and stories of six early era Hollywood production pioneers. Several years later, Chamales was instrumental in garnering attention for the 2004 nonfiction book I Heard You Paint Houses by Charles Brandt. Chamales discovered the book after his wife, Kathleen, heard Brandt speak at the Sun Valley Writers' Conference. Chamales partnered with Brandt and began championing the book in Los Angeles, first as a documentary and then as a narrative film, on advice of his son Ryan. He ultimately brought the book to entertainment attorney Jake Bloom. Bloom connected Chamales with Robert De Niro, and the project took shape, eventually landing at Netflix.

The book was ultimately adapted by Martin Scorsese and Netflix to become the 2019 epic crime film The Irishman, with Chamales as a producer. The film was released to wide acclaim from both critics and audiences, finishing on numerous lists of 2019's best films. The Irishman received 10 nominations at the 92nd Academy Awards, including Best Picture and Best Director for Scorsese, and grossed $8 million despite its primary release on the Netflix streaming service.

Chamales then produced the 2020 animated short film If Anything Happens I Love You, a groundbreaking look at gun violence that was released on Netflix, who also submitted it for consideration at the 93rd Academy Awards. The film went on to win Best Animated Short Film, and was widely considered to be one of the best animated dramas of the year. Chamales also worked as a producer on the 2012 Wes Bentley action film Rites of Passage.

== Philanthropy ==
=== Work with alcoholics and addicts ===
Chamales, who struggled with alcohol and drug abuse himself and had been through a period of homelessness and hospitalization, has been an active and committed proponent for helping others struggling with substance addiction. As part of his acclaimed management approach, he has pushed a hiring policy that gives second chances to those who have and continue to struggle with such addictions, with as much as 30% of his work force being recovering alcoholics and addicts at any given time. Chamales has consistently ensured that his recruitment process canvasses halfway houses, parole programs, homeless shelters, and drug and alcohol treatment programs - a process that has seen higher levels of retention compared to more traditional routes. His companies provide mentorship, motivation seminars, financial programs, extensive training, counseling in case of relapse and short-term loans to all employees. The Victoria Advocate noted that the policy was instrumental in creating a productive and supportive call center, where recovering addicts often found their experiences to be a motivational force in their sales career. In 1998, Omni had over $250000 in outstanding loans to employees, much of which was loaned for legal fees and drug enforcement fines. His extensive and groundbreaking work in this field has been spoken or written about on CNBC, ABC, NBC Nightly News and The O'Reilly Factor, Time, Success, BusinessWeek, Fortune, and The Wall Street Journal.

=== Rhinoceros conservation ===
Chamales has been a consistent and vocal activist for conservation throughout his career. He learned of conservation efforts by Cathay Pacific Airways and their first officer Paul McIntosh while aboard one of their planes, and was motivated to use his resources to help. By 1998, Omni was donating $25,000 per year to rhinoceros conservation in Kenya. Three years later, Chamales teamed with the Lewa Wildlife Conservancy in Northern Kenya to help save the nearly extinct black rhino. In solidarity with the cause, Chamales renamed the company Rhinotek Computer Products, and set up a novel program to donate a portion of each sale to Lewa. The success of the Rhinotek program has aided the Conservancy in their mission to fight for the conservation of lions, giraffes, and other threatened Kenyan species.

=== Other charitable work ===
Chamales has also been a long-time advocate for the homeless, and served for ten years as a board-member of the Midnight Mission in Los Angeles, a facility that provides food, shelter, and clothing in Southern California. In 2009, he was honored with the Golden Heart Award for his work in this field. Chamales and his wife Kathleen are also supporters of the Clare Foundation, where Kathleen serves on the honorary board of directors, and Friendly House, an organization that provides sober living for recovering women.

== Awards ==
Chamales has twice been recognized for his contributions to the American tech industry by the Ernst & Young Entrepreneur of the Year Award, with a nomination in 1998 and the award itself in 2001. Chamales and Rhinotek were recognized for a 20-year commitment to excellence in manufacturing and extraordinary customer service. In addition, Rhinotek has been named to IndustryWeek magazine's list of the top 25 U.S. manufacturers.

Chamales and Rhinotek also won the 2001 Golden Heart Leadership Award from the Midnight Mission, the 2001 Crime Prevention Program of the Year Award from the California Crime Prevention Officers Association and the Dr. Martin Luther King Jr. Drum Major for Justice Award.
