= List of TCA Awards received by Netflix =

List of awards won by Netflix
- Total number of wins and nominations
Totals	9	70
Ratio (%)	13	87
- References

Netflix is an American on-demand internet streaming media provider. Netflix and its programming have been nominated for multiple Television Critics Association Awards, listed below.

== Programs ==
=== Program of the Year ===
Program of the Year
Year	Program	Season	Result	Ref.
2013	House of Cards	Season 1	Nominated	
2014	Orange Is the New Black	Season 1	Nominated	
2016	Making a Murderer	Season 1	Nominated	
2017	Stranger Things	Season 1	Nominated	
2019	Russian Doll	Season 1	Nominated	
2019	When They See Us	Mini-series	Nominated	
2020	Unbelievable	Mini-series	Nominated	
2021	Bridgerton	Season 1	Nominated	
2021	The Queen's Gambit	Mini-series	Nominated	

=== Outstanding New Program ===
Outstanding New Program
Year	Program	Season	Result	Ref.
2013	House of Cards	Season 1	Nominated	
2014	Orange Is the New Black	Season 1	Won	
2016	Jessica Jones	Season 1	Nominated	
2016	Master of None	Season 1	Nominated	
2017	The Crown	Season 1	Nominated	
2017	Stranger Things	Season 1	Nominated	
2018	GLOW	Season 1	Nominated	
2018	Mindhunter	Season 1	Nominated	
2019	Russian Doll	Season 1	Won	
2019	Dead to Me	Season 1	Nominated	
2020	Never Have I Ever	Season 1	Nominated	
2021	Bridgerton	Season 1	Nominated	

=== Achievement in Drama ===
Outstanding Achievement in Drama
Year	Program	Season	Result	Ref.
2014	House of Cards	Season 2	Nominated	
2017	The Crown	Season 1	Nominated	
2017	Stranger Things	Season 1	Nominated	
2018	The Crown	Season 2	Nominated	
2020	The Crown	Season 3	Nominated	
2021	The Crown	Season 4	Won	
2021	Bridgerton	Season 1	Nominated	

=== Achievement in Comedy ===
Outstanding Achievement in Comedy
Year	Program	Season	Result	Ref.
2015	Unbreakable Kimmy Schmidt	Season 1	Nominated	
2016	Master of None	Season 1	Nominated	
2017	Master of None	Season 2	Nominated	
2018	GLOW	Season 1	Nominated	
2018	One Day at a Time	Season 2	Nominated	
2019	Russian Doll	Season 1	Nominated	
2020	Dead To Me	Season 2	Nominated	

=== Achievement in Movies, Miniseries, and Specials ===
Outstanding Achievement in Movies, Miniseries, and Specials
Year	Program	Season	Result	Ref.
2017	Gilmore Girls: A Year in the Life	Mini-series	Nominated	
2018	Alias Grace	Mini-series	Nominated	
2019	When They See Us	Mini-series	Nominated	
2020	Unbelievable	Mini-series	Nominated	
2021	The Queen's Gambit	Mini-series	Nominated	
2021	Bo Burnham: Inside	Variety Special	Nominated	

=== Achievement in Reality Programming ===
Outstanding Achievement in Reality Programming
Year	Program	Season	Result	Ref.
2016	Making a Murderer	Season 1	Won	
2017	The Keepers	Season 1	Nominated	
2018	Queer Eye	Season 1	Won	
2018	Nailed It!	Season 1	Nominated	
2019	Queer Eye	Season 3	Won	
2019	Nailed It!	Season 3	Nominated	
2019	Salt, Fat, Acid, Heat	Season 1	Nominated	
2019	Tidying Up with Marie Kondo	Season 1	Nominated	
2020	Cheer	Season 1	Won	
2021	Deaf U	Season 1	Won	
2021	Nailed It! Double Trouble	Season 5	Nominated	

=== Achievement in News and Information ===
Outstanding Achievement in News and Information
Year	Program	Season	Result	Ref.
2018	Wild Wild Country	Season 1	Nominated	
2019	Our Planet	Season 1	Nominated	

=== Achievement in Sketch/Variety Shows ===
Outstanding Achievement in Sketch/Variety Shows
Year	Program	Season	Result	Ref.
2019	I Think You Should Leave with Tim Robinson	Season 1	Nominated	

=== Achievement in Youth Programming ===
Outstanding Achievement in Youth Programming
Year	Program	Season	Result	Ref.
2019	Carmen Sandiego	Season 1	Nominated	
2020	Carmen Sandiego	Season 2	Nominated	
2021	The Baby-Sitters Club	Season 1	Won	
2021	Emily's Wonder Lab	Season 1	Nominated	
2021	Waffles + Mochi	Season 1	Nominated	

== Individual Achievement ==
=== Drama ===
Individual Achievement in Drama
Year	Performer	Program	Season	Result	Ref.
2017	Claire Foy	The Crown	Season 1	Nominated	
2020	Kaitlyn Dever	Unbelievable	Mini-series	Nominated	
2020	Merritt Wever	Unbelievable	Mini-series	Nominated	
2021	Anya Taylor-Joy	The Queen's Gambit	Mini-series	Nominated	
2021	Omar Sy	Lupin	Part 1 & Part 2	Nominated	

=== Comedy ===
Individual Achievement in Comedy
Year	Performer	Program	Season	Result	Ref.
2016	Aziz Ansari	Master of None	Season 1	Nominated	
2017	Aziz Ansari	Master of None	Season 2	Nominated	
2019	Natasha Lyonne	Russian Doll	Season 1	Nominated	
2020	Christina Applegate	Dead To Me	Season 1	Nominated	
2021	Bo Burnham	Bo Burnham: Inside	Variety Special	Nominated	

== See also ==
Main

- List of accolades received by Netflix

Others

- List of BAFTA Awards received by Netflix
- List of Golden Globe Awards received by Netflix
- List of Critics' Choice Awards received by Netflix
- List of Daytime Emmy Awards received by Netflix
- List of Primetime Emmy Awards received by Netflix
- List of Screen Actors Guild Awards received by Netflix
- List of Primetime Creative Arts Emmy Awards received by Netflix
