= List of Critics' Choice Television Awards received by Netflix =

List of awards won by Netflix
- Total number of wins and nominations
Totals	24	106
Ratio (%)	18	82
- References

The Critics' Choice Television Awards are accolades that are presented annually by the Broadcast Television Journalists Association (BTJA) (US). In 2014, Orange Is the New Black won Best Comedy Series, Best Supporting Actress in a Comedy for Kate Mulgrew and Best Guest Performer in a Comedy for Uzo Aduba. The following year, Orange Is the New Black's Lorraine Toussaint won Best Supporting Actress in a Drama. During the 6th Critics' Choice Television Awards Master of None won Best Comedy Series. In 2016, John Lithgow and Jane Krakowski won for their supporting roles in drama and comedy, respectively.

== Programs ==
=== Best Drama Series ===
Best Drama Series
Year	Program	Season	Episodes	Result	Ref.
2015	Orange Is the New Black	Season 2	13 episodes	Nominated	
2016*	Stranger Things	Season 1	8 episodes	Nominated	
2016*	The Crown	Season 1	10 episodes	Nominated	
2018	Stranger Things	Season 2	9 episodes	Nominated	
2018	The Crown	Season 2	10 episodes	Nominated	
2021	The Crown	Season 4	10 episodes	Won	
2021	Ozark	Season 3	10 episodes	Nominated	

=== Best Comedy Series ===
Best Comedy Series
Year	Program	Season	Episodes	Result	Ref.
2014	Orange Is the New Black	Season 1	13 episodes	Won	
2016	Master of None	Season 1	10 episodes	Won	
2016*	Unbreakable Kimmy Schmidt	Season 2	13 episodes	Nominated	
2018	GLOW	Season 1	10 episodes	Nominated	
2019	The Kominsky Method	Season 1	8 episodes	Nominated	
2019	One Day at a Time	Season 2	13 episodes	Nominated	
2020	One Day at a Time	Season 3	13 episodes	Nominated	

=== Best Limited Series ===
Best Limited Series
Year	Program	Season	Episodes	Result	Ref.
2018	American Vandal	Season 1	8 episodes	Nominated	
2018	Godless		7 episodes	Nominated	
2019	American Vandal	Season 2	8 episodes	Nominated	
2020	When They See Us		4 episodes	Won	
2020	Unbelievable		8 episodes	Nominated	
2021	The Queen's Gambit		7 episodes	Won	
2021	Unorthodox		4 episodes	Nominated	

=== Best TV Movie ===
Best TV Movie
Year	Program	Result	Ref.
2020	El Camino: A Breaking Bad Movie	Won	

=== Best Animated Series ===
Best Animated Series
Year	Program	Season	Episodes	Result	Ref.
2016	BoJack Horseman	Season 2	12 episodes	Won	
2016*	BoJack Horseman	Season 3	12 episodes	Won	
2018	BoJack Horseman	Season 4	12 episodes	Nominated	
2019	BoJack Horseman	Season 5	12 episodes	Won	
2020	BoJack Horseman	Season 6	8 episodes	Won	
2020	Big Mouth	Season 3	11 episodes	Nominated	
2020	The Dark Crystal: Age of Resistance		10 episodes	Nominated	
2020	She-Ra and the Princesses of Power	Season 3 and 4	19 episodes	Nominated	

=== Best Comedy Special ===
Best Comedy Special
Year	Program	Result	Ref.
2020	Amy Schumer: Growing	Nominated	
2020	Jenny Slate: Stage Fright	Nominated	
2020	Seth Meyers: Lobby Baby	Nominated	
2020	Trevor Noah: Son of Patricia	Nominated	
2020	Wanda Sykes: Not Normal	Nominated	
2021	Fortune Feimster: Sweet & Salty	Nominated	
2021	Hannah Gadsby: Douglas	Nominated	
2021	Jerry Seinfeld: 23 Hours to Kill	Won	
2021	Marc Maron: End Times Fun	Nominated	
2021	Michelle Buteau: Welcome to Buteaupia	Won	
2021	Patton Oswalt: I Love Everything	Nominated	

== Lead Performances ==
Nominated Performers

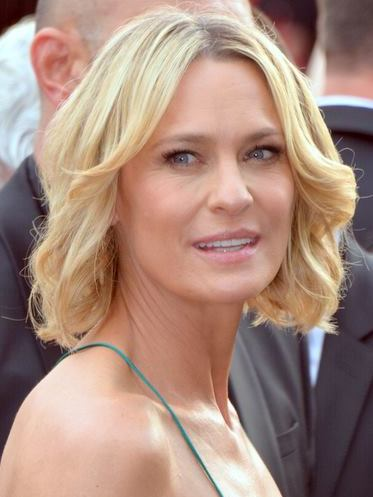
Robin Wright

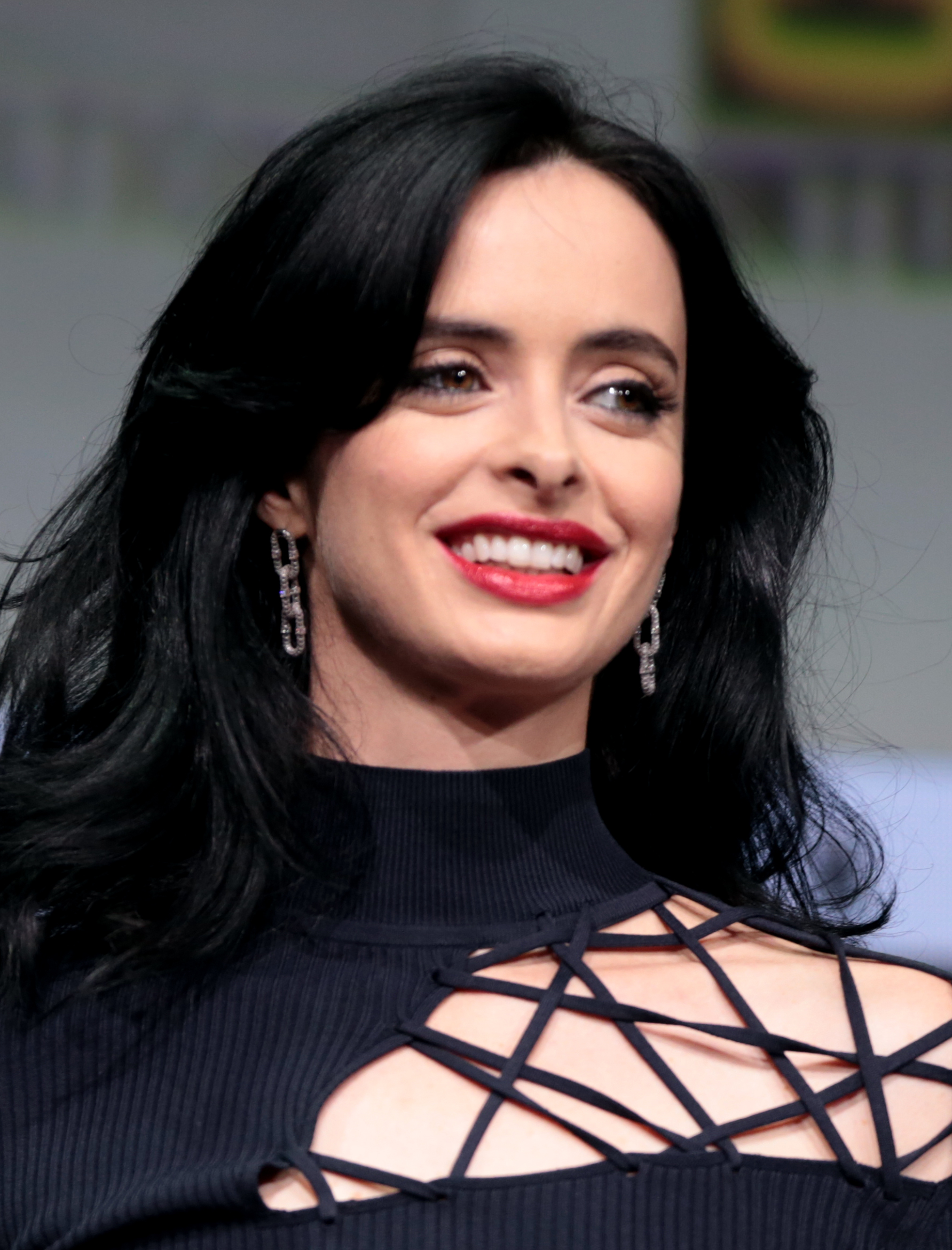
Krysten Ritter

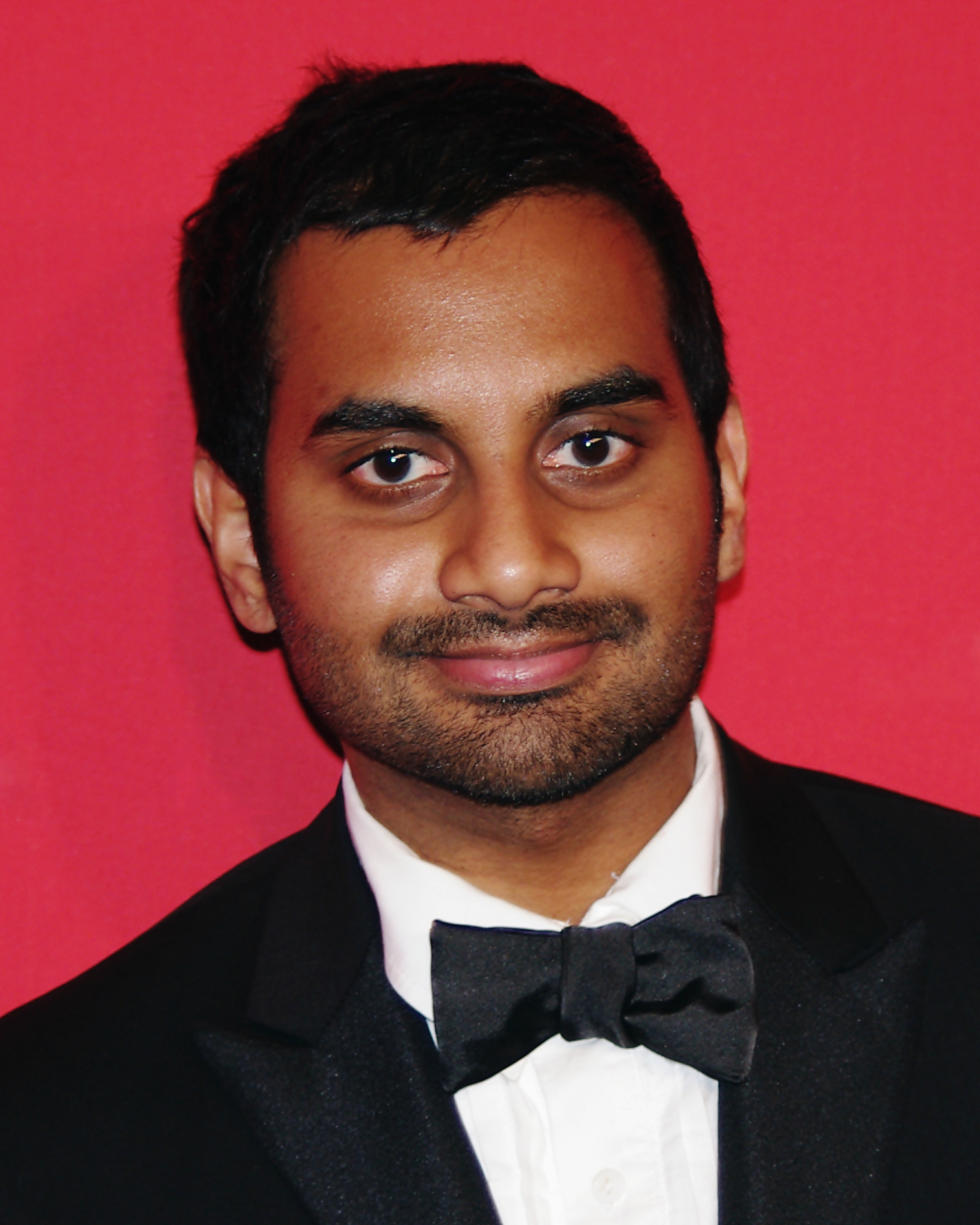
Aziz Ansari

=== Best Actor in a Drama Series ===
Best Actor in a Drama Series
Year	Actress	Program	Season	Result	Ref.
2013	Kevin Spacey	House of Cards	Season 1	Nominated	
2016*	Kevin Spacey	House of Cards	Season 4	Nominated	
2019	Diego Luna	Narcos: Mexico	Season 1	Nominated	
2019	Richard Madden	Bodyguard	Season 1	Nominated	
2020	Tobias Menzies	The Crown	Season 3	Nominated	
2021	Jason Bateman	Ozark	Season 3	Nominated	
2021	Josh O'Connor	The Crown	Season 4	Won	

=== Best Actress in a Drama Series ===
Best Actress in a Drama Series
Year	Actress	Program	Season	Result	Ref.
2014	Robin Wright	House of Cards	Season 2	Nominated	
2016	Krysten Ritter	Jessica Jones	Season 1	Nominated	
2016*	Robin Wright	House of Cards	Season 4	Nominated	
2018	Claire Foy	The Crown	Season 2	Nominated	
2018	Robin Wright	House of Cards	Season 5	Nominated	
2020	Olivia Colman	The Crown	Season 3	Nominated	
2021	Olivia Colman	The Crown	Season 4	Nominated	
2021	Emma Corrin	The Crown	Season 4	Won	
2021	Laura Linney	Ozark	Season 3	Nominated	

=== Best Actor in a Comedy Series ===
Best Actor in a Comedy Series
Year	Actress	Program	Season	Result	Ref.
2016	Aziz Ansari	Master of None	Season 1	Nominated	
2019	Michael Douglas	The Kominsky Method	Season 1	Nominated	
2020	Paul Rudd	Living with Yourself	Season 1	Nominated	

=== Best Actress in a Comedy Series ===
Best Actress in a Comedy Series
Year	Actress	Program	Season	Result	Ref.
2016	Ellie Kemper	Unbreakable Kimmy Schmidt	Season 2	Nominated	
2019	Justina Machado	One Day at a Time	Season 3	Nominated	
2020	Christina Applegate	Dead to Me	Season 1	Nominated	
2020	Alison Brie	GLOW	Season 3	Nominated	
2021	Christina Applegate	Dead to Me	Season 2	Nominated	

=== Best Actor in a Movie/Miniseries ===
Best Actor in a Movie/Miniseries
Year	Actor	Program	Result	Ref.
2020	Jharrel Jerome	When They See Us	Won	

=== Best Actress in a Movie/Miniseries ===
Best Actress in a Movie/Miniseries
Year	Actor	Program	Result	Ref.
2020	Kaitlyn Dever	Unbelievable	Nominated	
2020	Merritt Wever	Unbelievable	Nominated	
2021	Shira Haas	Unorthodox	Nominated	
2021	Anya Taylor-Joy	The Queen's Gambit	Won	

== Supporting Performances ==
Nominated Performers

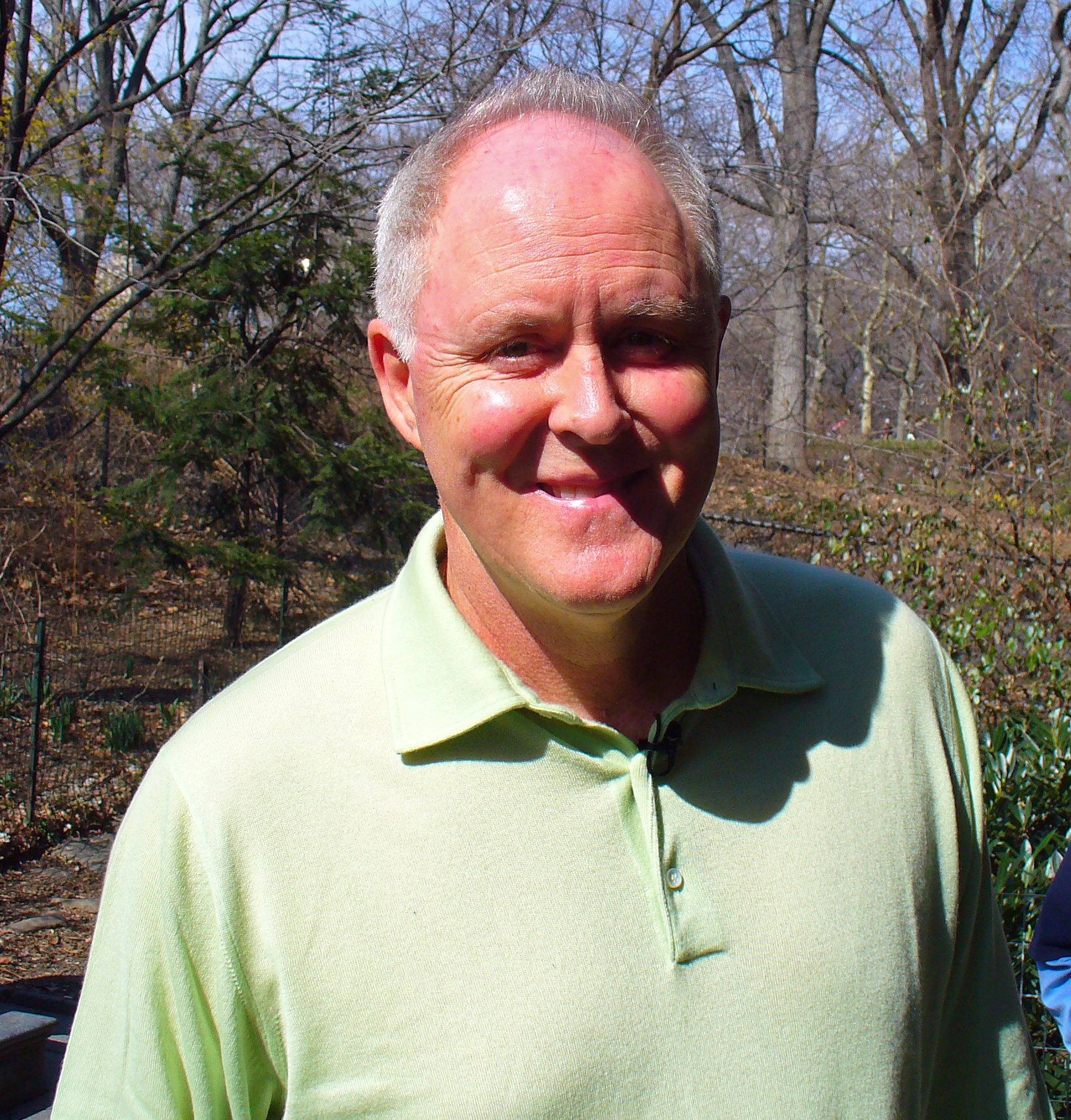
John Lithgow

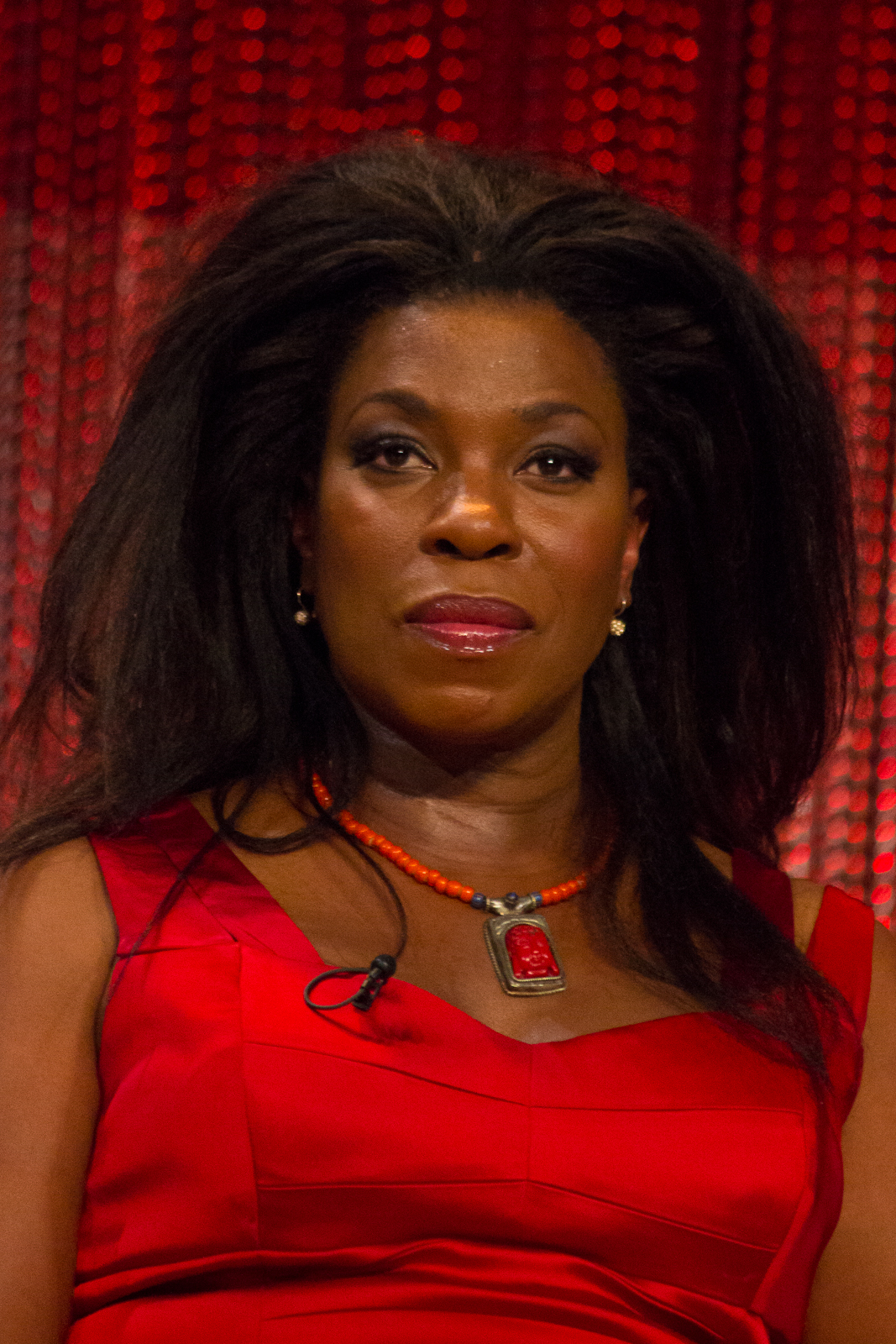
Lorraine Toussaint

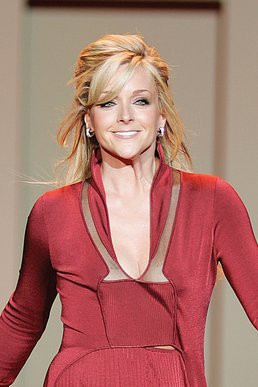
Jane Krakowski

=== Best Supporting Actor in a Drama Series ===
Best Supporting Actor in a Drama Series
Year	Actress	Program	Season	Result	Ref.
2013	Corey Stoll	House of Cards	Season 1	Nominated	
2015	Ben Mendelsohn	Bloodline	Season 1	Nominated	
2016*	John Lithgow	The Crown	Season 1	Won	
2018	David Harbour	Stranger Things	Season 2	Won	
2021	Tobias Menzies	The Crown	Season 4	Nominated	
2021	Tom Pelphrey	Ozark	Season 3	Nominated	

=== Best Supporting Actress in a Drama Series ===
Best Supporting Actress in a Drama Series
Year	Actress	Program	Season	Result	Ref.
2015	Lorraine Toussaint	Orange Is the New Black	Season 2	Won	
2019	Julia Garner	Ozark	Season 2	Nominated	
2020	Helena Bonham Carter	The Crown	Season 3	Nominated	
2021	Gillian Anderson	The Crown	Season 4	Won	
2021	Julia Garner	Ozark	Season 3	Nominated	
2021	Janet McTeer	Ozark	Season 3	Nominated	

=== Best Supporting Actor in a Comedy Series ===
Best Supporting Actor in a Comedy Series
Year	Actress	Program	Season	Result	Ref.
2015	Tituss Burgess	Unbreakable Kimmy Schmidt	Season 1	Nominated	
2016*	Tituss Burgess	Unbreakable Kimmy Schmidt	Season 2	Nominated	

=== Best Supporting Actress in a Comedy Series ===
Best Supporting Actress in a Comedy Series
Year	Actress	Program	Season	Result	Ref.
2014	Kate Mulgrew	Orange Is the New Black	Season 1	Won	
2014	Laverne Cox	Orange Is the New Black	Season 1	Nominated	
2016*	Jane Krakowski	Unbreakable Kimmy Schmidt	Season 2	Won	
2019	Betty Gilpin	GLOW	Season 2	Nominated	
2019	Rita Moreno	One Day at a Time	Season 2	Nominated	
2020	Betty Gilpin	GLOW	Season 3	Nominated	
2020	Rita Moreno	One Day at a Time	Season 3	Nominated	
2021	Ashley Park	Emily in Paris	Season 1	Nominated	

=== Best Supporting Actor in a Movie/Miniseries ===
Best Supporting Actor in a Movie/Miniseries
Year	Actor	Program	Result	Ref.
2020	Asante Blackk	When They See Us	Nominated	
2020	John Leguizamo	When They See Us	Nominated	
2020	Jesse Plemons	El Camino: A Breaking Bad Movie	Nominated	
2021	Dylan McDermott	Hollywood	Nominated	

=== Best Supporting Actress in a Movie/Miniseries ===
Best Supporting Actress in a Movie/Miniseries
Year	Actor	Program	Result	Ref.
2020	Marsha Stephanie Blake	When They See Us	Nominated	
2020	Niecy Nash	When They See Us	Nominated	
2020	Toni Collette	Unbelievable	Won	
2021	Marielle Heller	The Queen's Gambit	Nominated	

== Guest Performances ==
=== Best Guest Performer in a Drama Series ===
Best Guest Performer in a Drama Series
Year	Actress	Program	Season	Result	Ref.
2016*	Mahershala Ali	House of Cards	Season 4	Nominated	
2016*	Ellen Burstyn	House of Cards	Season 4	Nominated	
2016*	Jared Harris	The Crown	Season 1	Nominated	

=== Best Guest Performer in a Comedy Series ===
Best Guest Performer in a Comedy Series
Year	Actress	Program	Season	Result	Ref.
2014	Uzo Aduba	Orange Is the New Black	Season 1	Won	
2016	John Slattery	Wet Hot American Summer	Season 1	Nominated	
2016*	Lisa Kudrow	Unbreakable Kimmy Schmidt	Season 2	Nominated	

== See also ==
Main

- List of awards and nominations received by Netflix

Others

- List of TCA Awards received by Netflix
- List of BAFTA Awards received by Netflix
- List of Golden Globe Awards received by Netflix
- List of Daytime Emmy Awards received by Netflix
- List of Primetime Emmy Awards received by Netflix
- List of Screen Actors Guild Awards received by Netflix
- List of Primetime Creative Arts Emmy Awards received by Netflix
