= List of Daytime Emmy Awards received by Netflix =

List of awards won by Netflix
- Total number of wins and nominations
Totals	60	91
Ratio (%)	28	95
- References

The Daytime Emmy Award is an American accolade bestowed by the New York–based National Academy of Television Arts and Sciences in recognition of excellence in American daytime television programming.

== Programs ==
=== Children's Animated Program ===
Outstanding Children's Animated Program
Year	Program	Season	Result	Ref.
2014	Turbo FAST		Nominated	
2015	All Hail King Julien		Won	
2016	All Hail King Julien		Nominated	
2016	Dragons: Race to the Edge	Season 1	Nominated	
2016	The Mr. Peabody & Sherman Show	Season 3	Nominated	
2017	Dragons: Race to the Edge	Season 1	Nominated	
2017	The Mr. Peabody & Sherman Show	Season 3	Nominated	

=== Pre-School Children's Animated Program ===
Outstanding Pre-School Children's Animated Program
Year	Program	Season	Result	Ref.
2015	VeggieTales in the House	Season 1	Nominated	
2017	Ask the StoryBots	Season 1	Nominated	

=== Special Class Animated Program ===
Outstanding Special Class Animated Program
Year	Program	Season	Result	Ref.
2017	Trollhunters	Season 1	Nominated	

=== Outstanding Children's Series ===
Outstanding Children's Series
Year	Program	Season	Result	Ref.
2016	Project MC²		Nominated	

=== Special Class - Short Format Daytime Program ===
Outstanding Special Class - Short Format Daytime Program
Year	Program	Season	Result	Ref.
2017	The American Dream Project		Nominated	

== Performance ==
=== Performer in an Animated Program ===
Outstanding Performer in an Animated Program
Year	Performer	Program	Result	Ref.
2015	Danny Jacobs	All Hail King Julien	Won	
2017	Kelsey Grammer	Trollhunters	Won	
2017	Danny Jacobs	All Hail King Julien	Nominated	
2017	Andy Richter	All Hail King Julien	Nominated	
2019	Jay Baruchel	Dragons: Race to the Edge: Season 6	Won	

== Writing and Directing ==
=== Writing in a Preschool Program ===
Outstanding Writing in a Preschool Animated Program
Year	Recipients	Program	Result	Ref.
2017	Joshua Mapleston, Cleon Prineas, Josh Wakely	Beat Bugs	Won	
2017	James R. Backshall, Jiro Okida, Jeff Sweeney, John Van Bruggen, Craig Young	Justin Time GO!	Nominated	

=== Writing in a Program ===
Outstanding Writing in an Animated Program
Year	Recipients	Program	Result	Ref.
2017	Marc Guggenheim	Trollhunters	Won	
2017	Mitch Watson, Sharon Flynn, Benjamin Lapides, Elliott Owen, Michael Ryan	All Hail King Julien	Nominated	

=== Directing in a Program ===
Outstanding Directing in an Animated Program
Year	Recipients	Program	Result	Ref.
2015	Christo Stamboliev	All Hail King Julien	Nominated	
2016	Stephen Heneveld, Christo Stamboliev, James Wootton and Collette Sunderman	All Hail King Julien	Nominated	
2016	Mike Bell, Greg Miller and John Sanford	The Mr. Peabody & Sherman Show: Seasons 1	Nominated	
2017	Rodrigo Blaas, Guillermo del Toro	Trollhunters: Seasons 1	Won	
2017	Greg Miller	The Mr. Peabody & Sherman Show: Season 2	Nominated	

=== Directing in a Preschool Program ===
Outstanding Directing in a Preschool Animated Programs
Year	Recipients	Program	Result	Ref.
2017	Evan Spiridellis, Jacob Streilein, Ian Worrel	Ask the StoryBots	Nominated	
2017	Josh Wakely	Beat Bugs	Nominated	
2020	Harold Harris	True and the Rainbow Kingdom	Nominated	

== Sound and Music ==
=== Sound mixing - Animation ===
Outstanding Sound Mixing – Animation
Year	Recipients	Program	Result	Ref.
2014	Konrad Piñon	Turbo FAST: Season 1	Nominated	
2016	Devon Bowman, Vicki Lemar, Aran Tanchum, Ian Nyeste and D.J. Lynch	All Hail King Julien	Nominated	
2016	Devon Bowman, D.J. Lynch, Rob McIntyre and Aran Tanchum	Dinotrux: Season 1	Nominated	
2016	Carlos Sanches and Otis Van Osten	Dragons: Race to the Edge: Season 1	Nominated	
2017	Aran Tanchum, DJ Lynch, Ian Nyeste	All Hail King Julien: Seasons 3-4	Nominated	
2017	Otis Van Osten, Carlos Sanches	Dragons: Race to the Edge: Season 2	Nominated	
2017	Carlos Sanches	Trollhunters: Season 1	Nominated	

=== Sound Mixing in a Preschool Animated Program ===
Outstanding Sound Mixing in a Preschool Animated Program
Year	Recipients	Program	Result	Ref.
2017	Leonardo Nasca, Jared Nugent, Jeffrey Shiffman	Ask the StoryBots	Nominated	
2017	Brent Clark, Sam Hayward, Bob Mothersbaugh, Wes Swales	Beat Bugs	Nominated	
2017	Roberto D. Alegria, Devon G. Bowman, Alex Hall, Rob McIntyre, DJ Lynch	Dinotrux	Nominated	

=== Outstanding Sound Editing – Animation ===
Outstanding Sound Editing – Animation
Year	Recipients	Program	Result	Ref.
2016	Devon Bowman, Chris Gresham, Andrew Ing, D.J. Lynch, Peter Munters, Lawrence Reyes, Ian Nyeste, Mishelle Fordham, Aran Tanchum and Vincent Guisetti	All Hail King Julien	Nominated	
2016	Devon Bowman, Vincent Guisetti, Rob McIntyre, Shawn Bohonos, Jessey Drake, Andrew Ing, Marc Schmidt and Aran Tanchum	Dinotrux: Season 1	Nominated	
2016	Otis Van Osten, Joshua Aaron Johnson, Roger Pallan and Jason Oliver	Dragons: Race to the Edge: Season 1	Won	
2017	Shawn Bohonos, Robbi Smith, Heather Olsen, David Bonilla, Shaun Cunningham, Aran Tanchum, John Lampinen	The Adventures of Puss in Boots: Seasons 3-4	Nominated	
2017	Dan Smith, Otis Van Osten, Josh Johnson, Jason Oliver	Dragons: Race to the Edge: Season 2	Nominated	

=== Sound Editing in a Preschool Animated Program ===
Outstanding Sound Editing in a Preschool Animated Program
Year	Recipients	Program	Result	Ref.
2017	Andrew Ing, DJ Lynch, Marc Schmidt, Roberto D. Alegria, Devon G. Bowman, Alfredo Douglas, Rob McIntyre, Monique Reymond, Shawn Bohonos	Dinotrux: Seasons 2-3	Won	
2017	Jeffrey Shiffman, David Carfagno, Brad Meyer, Nicholas J. Ainsworth, Elliot Herman	Ask the StoryBots	Nominated	
2017	Jared Dwyer, Sam Hayward, Blair Slater	Beat Bugs: Seasons 1-2	Nominated	
2017	Sarah Vorhees	VeggieTales in the House	Nominated	

=== Original Song ===
Outstanding Original Song
Year	Recipients	Program	Result	Ref.
2016	Frederik Wiedmann, Mitch Watson ("True Bromance") (for "True Bromance")	All Hail King Julien	Won	
2017	Daniel Ingram, Joanna Lewis, Kristine Songco (for "The Legend of Everfree")	My Little Pony: Equestria Girls – Legend of Everfree	Nominated	
2017	Katie Herzig ("Morse Code") (for "World Records")	The Mr. Peabody & Sherman Show	Nominated	

== Other ==
=== Main Title and Graphic Design ===
Outstanding Main Title and Graphic Design
Year	Recipients	Program	Result	Ref.
2017	Ian Worrel, Taylor Clutter, Jeff Gill, Nikolas Ilic, Kendall Nelson, Taylor Price, Evan Spiridellis, Jacob Streilein, Nate Theis, Eddie West	Ask the StoryBots	Nominated	
2017	Rodrigo Blaas, Andy Erekson, Jonathan Catalan, Dai Weier, John Laus, David M.V. Jones	Trollhunters	Nominated	

=== Interactive Media ===
Outstanding Interactive Media – Enhancement to a Daytime Program or Series
Year	Program	Season	Result	Ref.
2017	Ask the StoryBots - Companion App and StoryBots Classroom		Won	

=== Casting for an Animated Series or Special ===
Outstanding Casting for an Animated Series or Special
Year	Recipients	Program	Result	Ref.
2015	Ania O'Hare	All Hail King Julien	Won	
2016	Ania O'Hare	The Adventures of Puss in Boots: Seasons 1-2	Won	
2016	Christi Soper and Ania O'Hare	Dragons: Race to the Edge: Season 1	Nominated	
2017	Mary Hidalgo and Ania O'Hare	Trollhunters: Season 1	Won	
2019	Ania O'Hare and Cymbre Walk	She-Ra and the Princesses of Power: Season 1	Nominated	
2020	Ania O'Hare and Cymbre Walk	Archibald's Next Big Thing: Season 1	Nominated	
2020	Mary Hidalgo	Green Eggs and Ham: Season 1	Won	

=== Individual Achievement in Animation ===
Outstanding Individual Achievement in Animation
Year	Recipients	Program	Episode	Result	Ref.
2017	Mike Chaffe	Trollhunters	“Becoming, Part 1”	Won	
2017	Kevin Dart	The Mr. Peabody & Sherman Show	“The Wrath Of Hughes”	Won	
2017	Victor Maldonado	Trollhunters	“Win, Lose Or Draal”	Won	
2017	Eastwood Wong	The Mr. Peabody & Sherman Show	“Pea Dummy/Mary Anning”	Won	

== See also ==
Main

- List of accolades received by Netflix

Others

- List of TCA Awards received by Netflix
- List of BAFTA Awards received by Netflix
- List of Golden Globe Awards received by Netflix
- List of Critics' Choice Awards received by Netflix
- List of Primetime Emmy Awards received by Netflix
- List of Screen Actors Guild Awards received by Netflix
- List of Primetime Creative Arts Emmy Awards received by Netflix
