= List of BAFTA Awards received by Netflix =

List of awards won by Netflix
- Total number of wins and nominations
Totals	14	107
Ratio (%)	12	88
- References

List of British Academy Film Awards and British Academy Television Awards won by Netflix.

== Programme ==
=== Best Drama Series ===
Best Drama Series
Year	Recipients	Programme	Series	Result	Ref.
2017		The Crown	Series 1	Nominated	
2018		The Crown	Series 2	Nominated	
2018		The End of the F***ing World	Series 1	Nominated	
2020		The End of the F***ing World	Series 2	Won	
2020		The Crown	Series 3	Nominated	
2020		Giri/Haji		Nominated	

=== Best Documentary ===
Best Documentary
Year	Recipients	Programme	Running Time	Result	Ref.
2016	Ava DuVernay	13th	100 minutes	Won	

=== Best Factual Series or Strand ===
Best Factual Series or Strand
Year	Recipients	Programme	Result	Ref.
2020	Nominees: Mark Lewis; Felicity Morris; Michael Harte; Dimitri Doganis	Don't F**k with Cats: Hunting an Internet Killer	Nominated	

=== Best International Programme ===
Best International Programme
Year	Recipients	Programme	Series	Result	Ref.
2014	Producers: Beau Willimon David Fincher Joshua Donen Kevin Spacey	House of Cards	Series 1	Nominated	
2015	Producers: Beau Willimon David Fincher Joshua Donen Kevin Spacey	House of Cards	Series 2	Nominated	
2015	Producers: Jenji Kohan Lisa I. Vinnecour Sara Hess Sian Heder	Orange is the New Black	Series 2	Nominated	
2016	Producers: Chris Brancato Carlo Bernard Doug Miro	Narcos	Series 1	Nominated	
2017	Producers: Chris Brancato Carlo Bernard Doug Miro	Stranger Things	Series 1	Nominated	
2020	Producers: Ava DuVernay; Jonathan King; Jane Rosenthal; Berry Welsh	When They See Us		Won	
2020	Producers: Susannah Grant; Sarah Timberman; Lisa Cholodenko	Unbelievable		Nominated	

=== Best Single Drama ===
Best Single Drama
Year	Recipients	Programme	Episode	Result	Ref.
2018		Black Mirror	"Hang the DJ"	Nominated	
2019		Black Mirror	"Bandersnatch"	Nominated	

== Film ==
=== Best Film ===
Year	Director	Producers	Film	Result	Ref
2019	Alfonso Cuarón	Alfonso Cuarón Gabriela Rodríguez	Roma	Won	
2020	Martin Scorsese	Robert De Niro Jane Rosenthal Martin Scorsese Emma Tillinger Koskoff	The Irishman	Nominated	

== Performance in Television ==
=== Best Actor ===
Best Actor
Year	Recipients	Programme	Series	Result	Ref.
2018	Joe Cole	Black Mirror	Series 4 ("Hang the DJ")	Nominated	
2020	Takehiro Hira	Giri/Haji		Nominated	

=== Best Actress ===
Best Actress
Year	Recipients	Programme	Series	Result	Ref.
2017	Claire Foy	The Crown	Series 1	Nominated	
2018	Claire Foy	The Crown	Series 2	Nominated	

=== Best Male Comedy Performance ===
Best Male Comedy Performance
Year	Recipients	Programme	Series	Result	Ref.
2020	Ncuti Gatwa	Sex Education	Series 1	Nominated	

=== Best Supporting Actor ===
Best Supporting Actor
Year	Recipients	Programme	Series	Result	Ref.
2017	John Lithgow	The Crown	Series 1	Nominated	
2017	Jared Harris	The Crown	Series 1	Nominated	
2018	Jimmi Simpson	Black Mirror	Series 4 ("USS Callister")	Nominated	
2020	Will Sharpe	Giri/Haji		Won	
2020	Josh O'Connor	The Crown	Series 3	Nominated	

=== Best Supporting Actress ===
Best Supporting Actress
Year	Recipients	Programme	Series	Result	Ref.
2017	Vanessa Kirby	The Crown	Series 1	Nominated	
2018	Vanessa Kirby	The Crown	Series 2	Won	
2020	Naomi Ackie	The End of the F***ing World	Series 2	Won	
2020	Helena Bonham Carter	The Crown	Series 3	Nominated	
2020	Jasmine Jobson	Top Boy	Series 3	Nominated	

== Performance in a Film ==
=== Best Actor in a Supporting Role ===
Best Actor in a Supporting Role
Year	Recipients	Film	Running Time	Result	Ref.
2015	Idris Elba	Beasts of No Nation	100 minutes	Nominated	

== Crafts ==
=== Breakthrough Talent ===
Breakthrough Talent
Year	Recipients	Programme	Series	Result	Ref.
2020	Aneil Karla (director)	Top Boy	Series 3	Nominated	
2020	Laurie Nunn (writer)	Sex Education	Series 1	Nominated	

=== Best Costume Design ===
Best Costume Design
Year	Recipients	Programme	Series	Result	Ref.
2017	Michele Clapton	The Crown	Series 1	Won	
2017	Susie Coulthard	Black Mirror	Series 3	Nominated	
2018	Jane Petrie	The Crown	Series 2	Nominated	

=== Best Director: Factual ===
Best Director: Factual
Year	Recipients	Programme	Series	Result	Ref.
2020	Mark Lewis	Don't F**k with Cats: Hunting an Internet Killer		Nominated	

=== Best Director: Fiction ===
Best Director: Fiction
Year	Recipients	Programme	Series	Result	Ref.
2017	Stephen Daldry	The Crown	Series 1	Nominated	

=== Best Editing: Factual ===
Best Editing: Factual
Year	Recipients	Programme	Series	Result	Ref.
2020	Michael Harte	Don't F**k with Cats: Hunting an Internet Killer		Won	

=== Best Editing: Fiction ===
Best Editing: Fiction
Year	Recipients	Programme	Series	Result	Ref.
2018	Pia di Ciaula	The Crown	Series 2 ("Paterfamilias")	Nominated	
2019	Tony Kearns	Black Mirror	("Bandersnatch")	Nominated	
2020	Elen Pierce Lewis	Giri/Haji		Nominated	

=== Best Make Up and Hair Design ===
Best Make Up and Hair Design
Year	Recipients	Programme	Series	Result	Ref.
2017	Tanya Lodge	Black Mirror	Series 3	Won	

=== Best Original Music ===
Best Original Music
Year	Recipients	Programme	Series	Result	Ref.
2020	Adrian Johnston	Giri/Haji		Nominated	

=== Best Photography: Factual ===
Best Photography: Factual
Year	Recipients	Programme	Series	Result	Ref.
2020	Doug Anderson, Roger Horrocks, Gavin Thurston	Our Planet	Series 1 ("Coastal Seas")	Nominated	
2020	Jamie McPherson, Hector Skevington-Postles, Barrie Britton	Our Planet	Series 1 ("Frozen Worlds")	Nominated	

=== Best Photography and Lightning: Fiction ===
Best Photography and Lightning: Fiction
Year	Recipients	Programme	Series	Result	Ref.
2017	Adriano Goldman	The Crown	Series 1	Nominated	
2017	Seamus McGarvey	Black Mirror	Series 3	Nominated	
2018	Adriano Goldman	The Crown	Series 2 ("Beryl")	Won	
2018	Stephan Pehrsson	Black Mirror	Series 4 ("USS Callister")	Nominated	
2020	Adriano Goldman	The Crown	Series 3	Nominated	
2020	Joe Anderson	Top Boy	Series 1	Nominated	

=== Best Production Design ===
Best Production Design
Year	Recipients	Programme	Series	Result	Ref.
2017	Martin Childs	The Crown	Series 1	Nominated	
2018	Joel Collins, Phil Sims	Black Mirror	Series 4 ("USS Callister")	Nominated	
2018	Martin Childs, Alison Harvey	The Crown	Series 2	Nominated	
2020	Martin Childs, Alison Harvey	The Crown	Series 3	Nominated	
2020	Samantha Harley, Miri Katz	Sex Education	Series 1	Nominated	

=== Best Scripted Casting ===
Best Scripted Casting
Year	Recipients	Programme	Series	Result	Ref.
2020	Des Hamilton	Top Boy	Series 3	Won	
2020	Lauren Evans	Sex Education	Series 1	Nominated	
2020	Yoko Narahashi, Shaheen Baig, Layla Merrick-Wolf	Giri/Haji		Nominated	

=== Best Sound: Factual ===
Best Sound: Factual
Year	Recipients	Programme	Series	Result	Ref.
2020	Nominees: Graham Wild; Kate Hopkins; Tim Owens	Our Planet	Series 1 ("One Planet")	Nominated	
2020	Nominees: Nick Fry; Steve Speed; James Evans; Nick Adams	Formula 1: Drive to Survive		Nominated	

=== Best Sound: Fiction ===
Best Sound: Fiction
Year	Recipients	Programme	Series	Result	Ref.
2018	Sound Team	The Crown	Series 2	Won	
2018	Nominees: John Rodda; Tim Cavagin; Kenny Clark; Michael Maroussas	Black Mirror	Series 4 ("USS Callister")	Nominated	
2020	Sound Team	The Crown	Series 3	Nominated	

=== Best Special, Visual, and Graphic Effects ===
Best Special, Visual, and Graphic Effects
Year	Recipients	Programme	Series	Result	Ref.
2017	Úna Ní Dhonghaíle, Molinare	The Crown	Series 1	Won	
2017	Nominees: Justin Hutchinson-Chatburn; Framestore; Glassworks; Baseblack	Black Mirror	Series 3	Nominated	
2018	Nominees: DNEG TV; Jean-Clement Soret; Russell McLean; Joel Collins	Black Mirror	Series 4 ("Metalhead")	Won	
2018	Nominees: One of Us; Asa Shoul; Christopher Reynolds	The Crown	Series 2	Nominated	
2019	Nominees: Glassworks; Jean-Clement Soret; Clayton McDermott; Mark Coulier	Black Mirror	"Bandersnatch"	Nominated	
2019	Nominees: Kent Houston; Peerless; Freefolk; Asa Shoul	The Alienist	Series 1	Nominated	
2020	Nominees: Ben Turner; Chris Reynolds; Asa Shoul	The Crown	Series 3	Nominated	

=== Best Titles and Graphic Identity ===
Best Titles and Graphic Identity
Year	Recipients	Programme	Series	Result	Ref.
2017	Patrick Clair, Raoul Marks	The Crown	Series 1	Nominated	
2019	Allison Brownmoore, Anthony Brownmoore, Joe Nowacki	Take Your Pills		Nominated	

=== Best Writer: Drama ===
Best Writer: Drama
Year	Recipients	Programme	Series	Result	Ref.
2017	Peter Morgan	The Crown	Series 1	Nominated	
2018	Peter Morgan	The Crown	Series 2	Nominated	
2018	Charlie Brooker	Black Mirror	Series 4 ("Hang the DJ")	Nominated	
2020	Charlie Covell	The End of the F***ing World	Series 2	Nominated	

== See also ==
- List of accolades received by Netflix

Others

- List of TCA Awards received by Netflix
- List of Golden Globe Awards received by Netflix
- List of Critics' Choice Awards received by Netflix
- List of Daytime Emmy Awards received by Netflix
- List of Primetime Emmy Awards received by Netflix
- List of Screen Actors Guild Awards received by Netflix
- List of Primetime Creative Arts Emmy Awards received by Netflix
