= List of Actor Awards received by Netflix =

List of awards won by Netflix
- Total number of wins and nominations
Totals	33	181
- References

The Actor Award is an accolade given by the Screen Actors Guild‐American Federation of Television and Radio Artists (SAG-AFTRA) to recognize outstanding performances in film and primetime television. In 2014, Netflix earned its first two nominations. The following year the network won three awards, Outstanding Performance by an Ensemble in a Comedy Series for Orange Is the New Black, Outstanding Performance by a Male Actor in a Drama Series for Kevin Spacey from House of Cards and Outstanding Performance by a Female Actor in a Comedy Series for Orange Is the New Black's Uzo Aduba. In 2016, all three winners repeated. In addition, Idris Elba won for Outstanding Performance by Male Actor in a Supporting Role for the film Beasts of No Nation. During the 2017 ceremony, The Crown won for performances of Claire Foy and John Lithgow, Stranger Things won for Outstanding Performance by an Ensemble in a Drama Series and Orange Is the New Black won for a third year in a row Outstanding Performance by an Ensemble in a Comedy Series.

== Performance by an Ensemble ==
=== Ensemble in a Drama Series ===
Outstanding Performance by an Ensemble in a Drama Series
Year	Program	Recipients	Result	Ref.
2015	House of Cards	Mahershala Ali, Jayne Atkinson, Rachel Brosnahan, Derek Cecil, Nathan Darrow, Michel Gill, Joanna Going, Sakina Jaffrey, Michael Kelly, Mozhan Marno, Gerald McRaney, Molly Parker, Jimmi Simpson, Kevin Spacey, Robin Wright	Nominated	
2016	House of Cards	Mahershala Ali, Derek Cecil, Nathan Darrow, Michael Kelly, Elizabeth Marvel, Molly Parker, Jimmi Simpson, Kevin Spacey, Robin Wright	Nominated	
2017	The Crown	Claire Foy, Clive Francis, Harry Hadden-Paton, Victoria Hamilton, Daniel Ings, Billy Jenkins, Vanessa Kirby, John Lithgow, Lizzy McInnerny, Ben Miles, Jeremy Northam, Nicholas Rowe, Matt Smith, Pip Torrens, Harriet Walter	Nominated	
2017	Stranger Things	Millie Bobby Brown, Cara Buono, Joe Chrest, Natalia Dyer, David Harbour, Charlie Heaton, Joe Keery, Gaten Matarazzo, Caleb McLaughlin, Matthew Modine, Rob Morgan, John Paul Reynolds, Winona Ryder, Noah Schnapp, Mark Steger, Finn Wolfhard	Won	
2018	The Crown	Claire Foy, Victoria Hamilton, Vanessa Kirby, Anton Lesser, Matt Smith	Nominated	
2018	Stranger Things	Sean Astin, Millie Bobby Brown, Cara Buono, Joe Chrest, Catherine Curtin, Natalia Dyer, David Harbour, Charlie Heaton, Joe Keery, Gaten Matarazzo, Caleb McLaughlin, Dacre Montgomery, Paul Reiser, Winona Ryder, Noah Schnapp, Sadie Sink, Finn Wolfhard	Nominated	
2019	Ozark	Jason Bateman, Lisa Emery, Skylar Gaertner, Julia Garner, Darren Goldstein, Jason Butler Harner, Carson Holmes, Sofia Hublitz, Laura Linney, Trevor Long, Janet McTeer, Peter Mullan, Jordana Spiro, Charlie Tahan, Robert Treveiler, Harris Yulin	Nominated	
2020	The Crown	Marion Bailey, Helena Bonham Carter, Olivia Colman, Charles Dance, Ben Daniels, Erin Doherty, Charles Edwards, Tobias Menzies, Josh O'Connor, Sam Phillips, David Rintoul, Jason Watkins	Won	
2020	Stranger Things	Millie Bobby Brown, Cara Buono, Jake Busey, Natalia Dyer, Cary Elwes, Priah Ferguson, Brett Gelman, David Harbour, Maya Hawke, Charlie Heaton, Andrey Ivchenko, Joe Keery, Gaten Matarazzo, Caleb McLaughlin, Dacre Montgomery, Michael Park, Francesca Reale, Winona Ryder, Noah Schnapp, Sadie Sink, Finn Wolfhard	Nominated	
2021	Bridgerton	Adjoa Andoh, Julie Andrews, Lorraine Ashbourne, Jonathan Bailey, Ruby Barker, Jason Barnett, Sabrina Bartlett, Joanna Bobin, Harriet Cains, Bessie Carter, Nicola Coughlan, Kathryn Drysdale, Phoebe Dynevor, Ruth Gemmell, Florence Hunt, Martins Imhangbe, Claudia Jessie, Jessica Madsen, Molly McGlynn, Ben Miller, Luke Newton, Julian Ovenden, Regé-Jean Page, Golda Rosheuvel, Hugh Sachs, Luke Thompson, Will Tilston, Polly Walker	Nominated	
2021	The Crown	Gillian Anderson, Marion Bailey, Helena Bonham Carter, Stephen Boxer, Olivia Colman, Emma Corrin, Erin Doherty, Charles Edwards, Emerald Fennell, Tobias Menzies, Josh O'Connor, Sam Phillips	Won	
2021	Ozark	Jason Bateman, McKinley Belcher III, Jessica Frances Dukes, Lisa Emery, Skylar Gaertner, Julia Garner, Sofia Hublitz, Kevin L. Johnson, Laura Linney, Janet McTeer, Tom Pelphrey, Joseph Sikora, Felix Solis, Charlie Tahan, Madison Thompson	Nominated	
2022	Squid Game	Heo Sung-tae, Jun Young-soo, HoYeon Jung, Kim Joo-ryoung, Lee Byung-hun, Lee Jung-jae, O Yeong-su, Park Hae-soo, Anupam Tripathi, and Wi Ha-joon	Nominated	
2023	The Crown	Elizabeth Debicki, Claudia Harrison, Andrew Havill, Lesley Manville, Jonny Lee Miller, Flora Montgomery, James Murray, Jonathan Pryce, Ed Sayer, Imelda Staunton, Marcia Warren, Dominic West, and Olivia Williams	Nominated	
2023	Ozark	Jason Bateman, Nelson Bonilla, Jessica Frances Dukes, Lisa Emery, Skylar Gaertner, Julia Garner, Alfonso Herrera, Sofia Hublitz, Kevin L. Johnson, Katrina Lenk, Laura Linney, Adam Rothenberg, Felix Solis, Charlie Tahan, Richard Thomas, and Damian Young	Nominated	
2024	The Crown	Khalid Abdalla, Sebastian Blunt, Bertie Carvel, Salim Daw, Elizabeth Debicki, Luther Ford, Claudia Harrison, Lesley Manville, Ed McVey, James Murray, Jonathan Pryce, Imelda Staunton, Marcia Warren, Dominic West, and Olivia Williams	Nominated	
2025	Bridgerton	Geraldine Alexander, Victor Alli, Adjoa Andoh, Julie Andrews, Lorraine Ashbourne, Simone Ashley, Jonathan Bailey, Joe Barnes, Joanna Bobin, James Bryan, Harriet Cains, Bessie Carter, Genevieve Chenneour, Dominic Coleman, Nicola Coughlan, Kitty Devlin, Hannah Dodd, Daniel Francis, Ruth Gemmell, Rosa Hesmondhalgh, Sesley Hope, Florence Hunt, Martins Imhangbe, Molly Jackson-Shaw, Claudia Jessie, Lorn Macdonald, Jessica Madsen, Emma Naomi, Hannah New, Luke Newton, Caleb Obediah, James Phoon, Vineeta Rishi, Golda Rosheuvel, Hugh Sachs, Banita Sandhu, Luke Thompson, Will Tilston, Polly Walker, Anna Wilson-Jones, and Sophie Woolley	Nominated	
2025	The Diplomat	Ali Ahn, Sandy Amon-Schwartz, Tim Delap, Penny Downie, Ato Essandoh, David Gyasi, Celia Imrie, Rory Kinnear, Pearl Mackie, Nana Mensah, Graham Miller, Keri Russell, Rufus Sewell, Adam Silver, and Kenichiro Thomson	Nominated	

=== Ensemble in a Comedy Series ===
Outstanding Performance by an Ensemble in a Comedy Series
Year	Program	Recipients	Result	Ref.
2015	Orange Is the New Black	Uzo Aduba, Jason Biggs, Danielle Brooks, Laverne Cox, Jackie Cruz, Catherine Curtin, Lea DeLaria, Beth Fowler, Yvette Freeman, Germar Terrell Gardner, Kimiko Glenn, Annie Golden, Diane Guerrero, Michael J. Harney, Vicky Jeudy, Julie Lake, Lauren Lapkus, Selenis Leyva, Natasha Lyonne, Taryn Manning, Joel Marsh Garland, Matt McGorry, Adrienne C. Moore, Kate Mulgrew, Emma Myles, Jessica Pimentel, Dascha Polanco, Alysia Reiner, Judith Roberts, Elizabeth Rodriguez, Barbara Rosenblat, Nick Sandow, Abigail Savage, Taylor Schilling, Constance Shulman, Dale Soules, Yael Stone, Lorraine Toussaint, Lin Tucci, Samira Wiley	Won	
2016	Orange Is the New Black	Uzo Aduba, Mike Birbiglia, Marsha Stephanie Blake, Danielle Brooks, Laverne Cox, Jackie Cruz, Catherine Curtin, Lea DeLaria, Beth Fowler, Joel Marsh Garland, Kimiko Glenn, Annie Golden, Diane Guerrero, Michael J. Harney, Vicky Jeudy, Selenis Leyva, Taryn Manning, Adrienne C. Moore, Kate Mulgrew, Emma Myles, Matt Peters, Lori Petty, Jessica Pimentel, Dascha Polanco, Laura Prepon, Elizabeth Rodriguez, Ruby Rose, Nick Sandow, Abigail Savage, Taylor Schilling, Constance Shulman, Dale Soules, Yael Stone, Samira Wiley	Won	
2017	Orange Is the New Black	Uzo Aduba, Alan Aisenberg, Danielle Brooks, Blair Brown, Jackie Cruz, Lea DeLaria, Beth Dover, Kimiko Glenn, Annie Golden, Laura Gómez, Diane Guerrero, Michael J. Harney, Brad William Henke, Vicky Jeudy, Julie Lake, Selenis Leyva, Natasha Lyonne, Taryn Manning, James McMenamin, Adrienne C. Moore, Kate Mulgrew, Emma Myles, Matt Peters, Lori Petty, Jessica Pimentel, Dascha Polanco, Laura Prepon, Jolene Purdy, Elizabeth Rodriguez, Nick Sandow, Abigail Savage, Taylor Schilling, Constance Shulman, Dale Soules, Yael Stone, Lin Tucci, Samira Wiley	Won	
2018	GLOW	Britt Baron, Alison Brie, Kimmy Gatewood, Betty Gilpin, Rebekka Johnson, Chris Lowell, Sunita Mani, Marc Maron, Kate Nash, Sydelle Noel, Marianna Palka, Gayle Rankin, Bashir Salahuddin, Rich Sommer, Kia Stevens, Jackie Tohn, Ellen Wong, Britney Young	Nominated	
2019	GLOW	Britt Baron, Shakira Barrera, Alison Brie, Kimmy Gatewood, Betty Gilpin, Rebekka Johnson, Chris Lowell, Sunita Mani, Marc Maron, Kate Nash, Wyatt Nash, Sydelle Noel, Victor Quinaz, Gayle Rankin, Bashir Salahuddin, Kia Stevens, Jackie Tohn, Ellen Wong, Britney Young	Nominated	
2019	The Kominsky Method	Jenna Lyng Adams, Alan Arkin, Sarah Baker, Casey Thomas Brown, Michael Douglas, Ashleigh LaThrop, Emily Osment, Graham Rogers, Susan Sullivan, Melissa Tang, Nancy Travis	Nominated	
2020	The Kominsky Method	Jenna Lyng Adams, Alan Arkin, Sarah Baker, Casey Thomas Brown, Michael Douglas, Lisa Edelstein, Paul Reiser, Graham Rogers, Jane Seymour, Melissa Tang, Nancy Travis	Nominated	
2021	Dead to Me	Christina Applegate, Linda Cardellini, Max Jenkins, James Marsden, Sam McCarthy, Natalie Morales, Diana Maria Riva, Luke Roessler	Nominated	
2022	The Kominsky Method	Jenna Lyng Adams, Sarah Baker, Casey Thomas Brown, Michael Douglas, Lisa Edelstein, Ashleigh LaThrop, Emily Osment, Haley Joel Osment, Paul Reiser, Graham Rogers, Melissa Tang, and Kathleen Turner	Nominated	

=== Action Stunt Ensemble in a Television Series ===
Outstanding Action Performance by a Stunt Ensemble in a Television Series
Year	Program	Result	Ref.
2016	Marvel's Daredevil	Nominated	
2017	Marvel's Daredevil	Nominated	
2017	Marvel's Luke Cage	Nominated	
2018	GLOW	Nominated	
2018	Stranger Things	Nominated	
2019	GLOW	Won	
2019	Marvel's Daredevil	Nominated	
2020	GLOW	Nominated	
2020	Stranger Things	Nominated	
2021	Cobra Kai	Nominated	
2022	Cobra Kai	Nominated	
2022	Squid Game	Won	
2023	Stranger Things	Won	
2024	Beef	Nominated	

=== Cast in a Motion Picture ===
Outstanding Performance by a Cast in a Motion Picture
Year	Film	Recipients	Result	Ref.
2016	Beasts of No Nation	Abraham Attah, Kurt Egyiawan, Idris Elba	Nominated	
2018	Mudbound	Jonathan Banks, Mary J. Blige, Jason Clarke, Garrett Hedlund, Jason Mitchell, Rob Morgan, Carey Mulligan	Nominated	
2020	The Irishman	Bobby Canavale, Robert De Niro, Stephen Graham, Harvey Keitel, Al Pacino, Anna Paquin, Joe Pesci, Ray Romano	Nominated	
2021	Da 5 Bloods	Chadwick Boseman, Paul Walter Hauser, Nguyễn Ngọc Lâm, Lê Y Lan, Norm Lewis, Delroy Lindo, Jonathan Majors, Veronica Ngo, Johnny Trí Nguyễn, Jasper Pääkkönen, Clarke Peters, Sandy Hương Phạm, Jean Reno, Mélanie Thierry, Isiah Whitlock Jr.	Nominated	
2021	Ma Rainey's Black Bottom	Chadwick Boseman, Jonny Coyne, Viola Davis, Colman Domingo, Michael Potts, Glynn Turman	Nominated	
2021	The Trial of the Chicago 7	Yahya Abdul-Mateen II, Sacha Baron Cohen, Joseph Gordon-Levitt, Michael Keaton, Frank Langella, John Carroll Lynch, Eddie Redmayne, Mark Rylance, Alex Sharp, Jeremy Strong	Won	
2022	Don't Look Up	Cate Blanchett, Timothée Chalamet, Leonardo DiCaprio, Ariana Grande, Jonah Hill, Jennifer Lawrence, Melanie Lynskey, Scott Mescudi, Rob Morgan, Himesh Patel, Ron Perlman, Tyler Perry, Mark Rylance and Meryl Streep	Nominated	
2025	Emilia Pérez	Karla Sofía Gascón, Selena Gomez, Adriana Paz, and Zoe Saldaña	Nominated	

=== Action Stunt Ensemble in a Motion Picture ===
Outstanding Action Performance by a Stunt Ensemble in a Motion Picture
Year	Film	Result	Ref.
2019	The Ballad of Buster Scruggs	Nominated	
2020	The Irishman	Nominated	
2021	Da 5 Bloods	Nominated	
2021	News of the World	Nominated	
2021	The Trial of the Chicago 7	Nominated	

== Performances in Television ==
SAG Award Winners

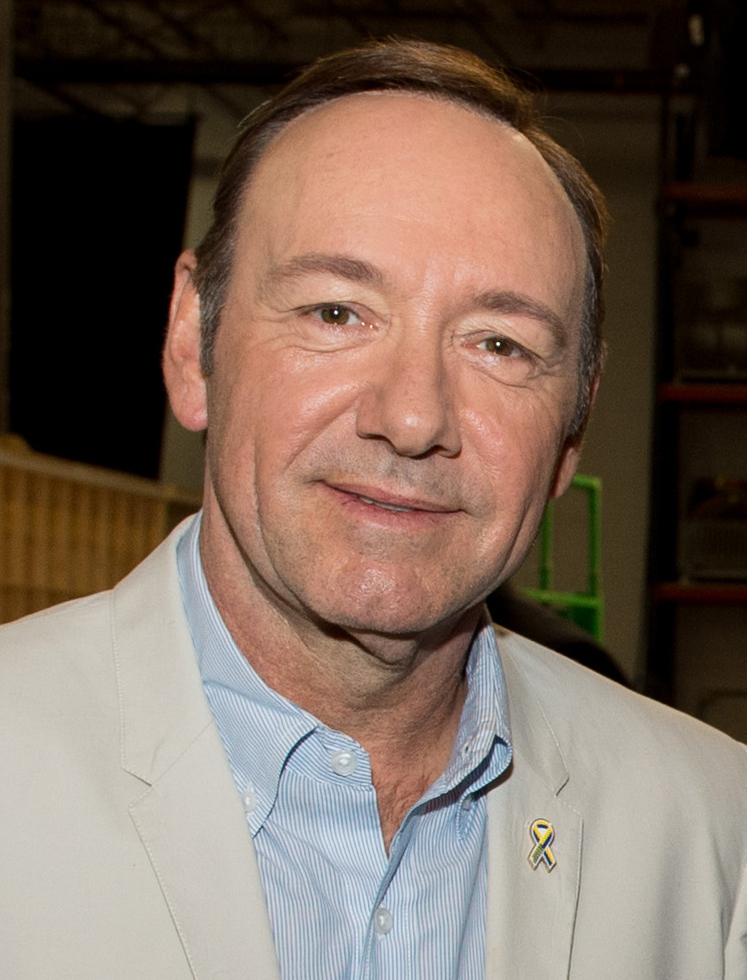
Kevin Spacey

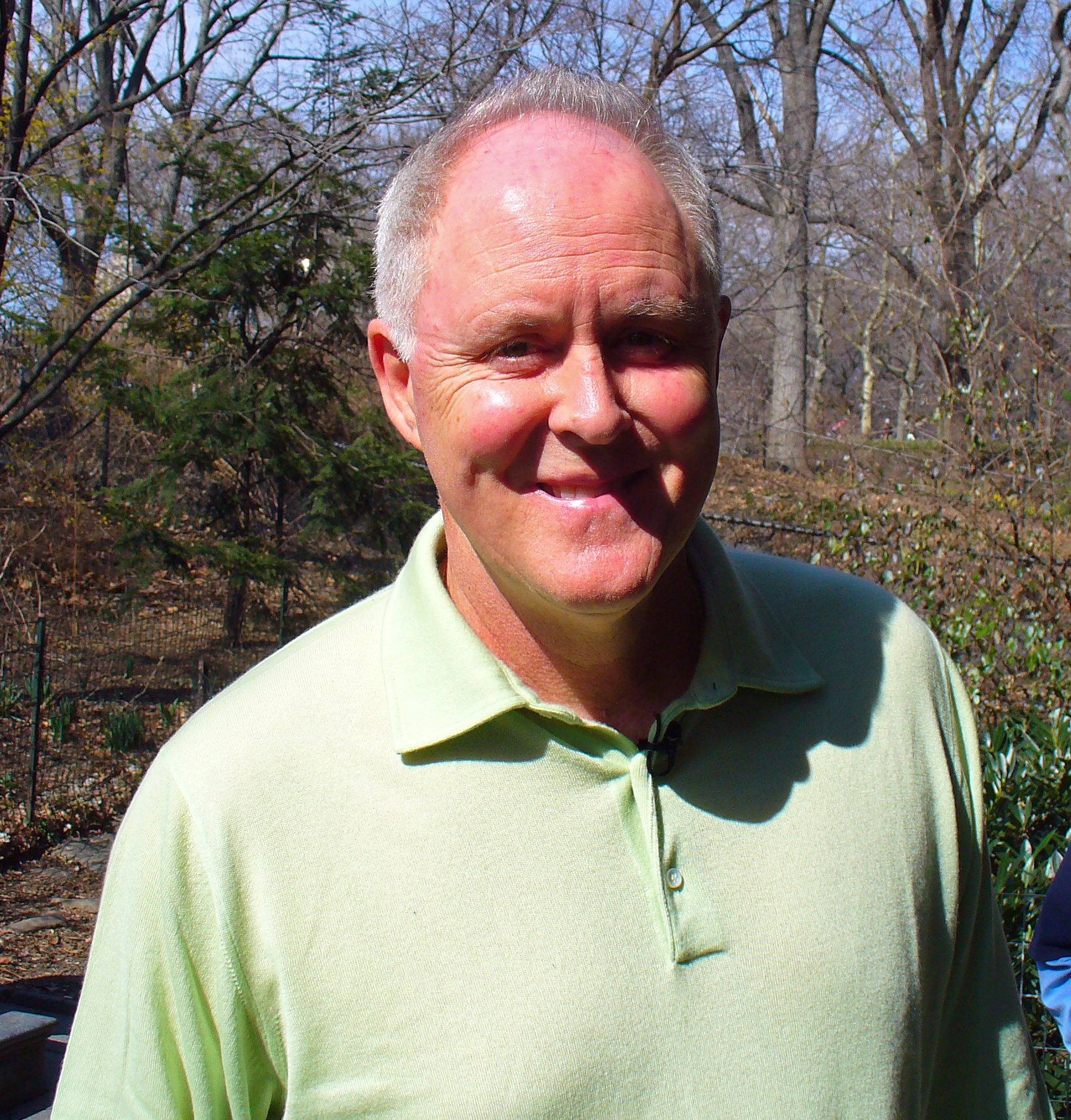
John Lithgow

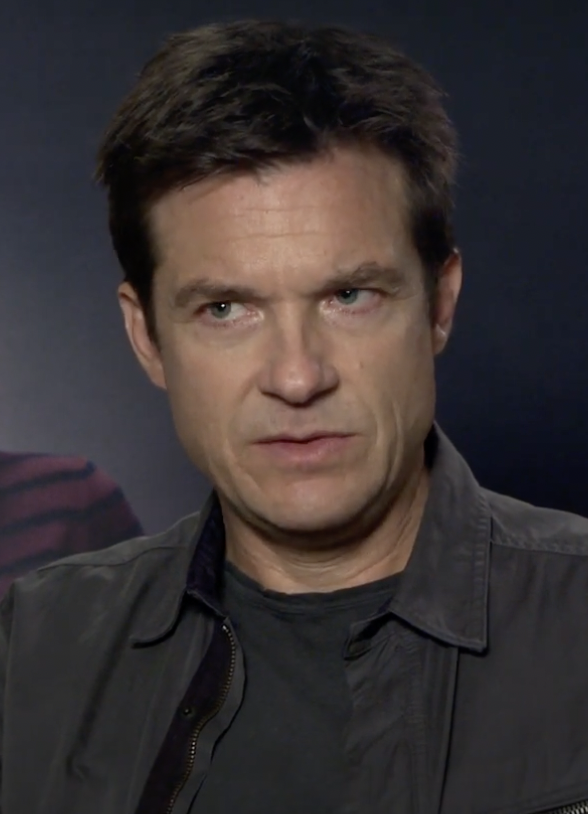
Jason Bateman

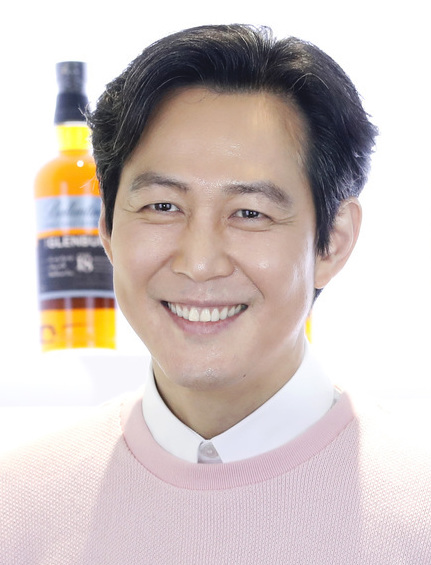
Lee Jung-jae

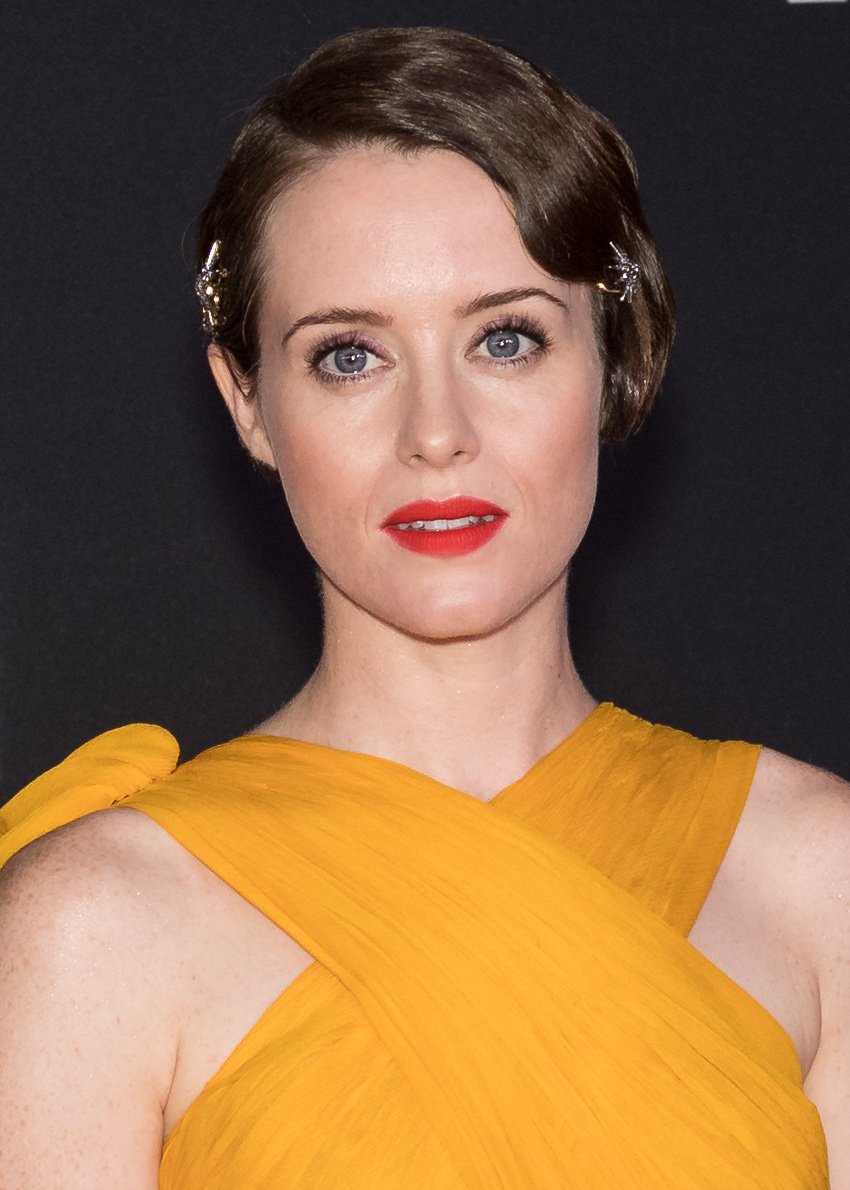
Claire Foy

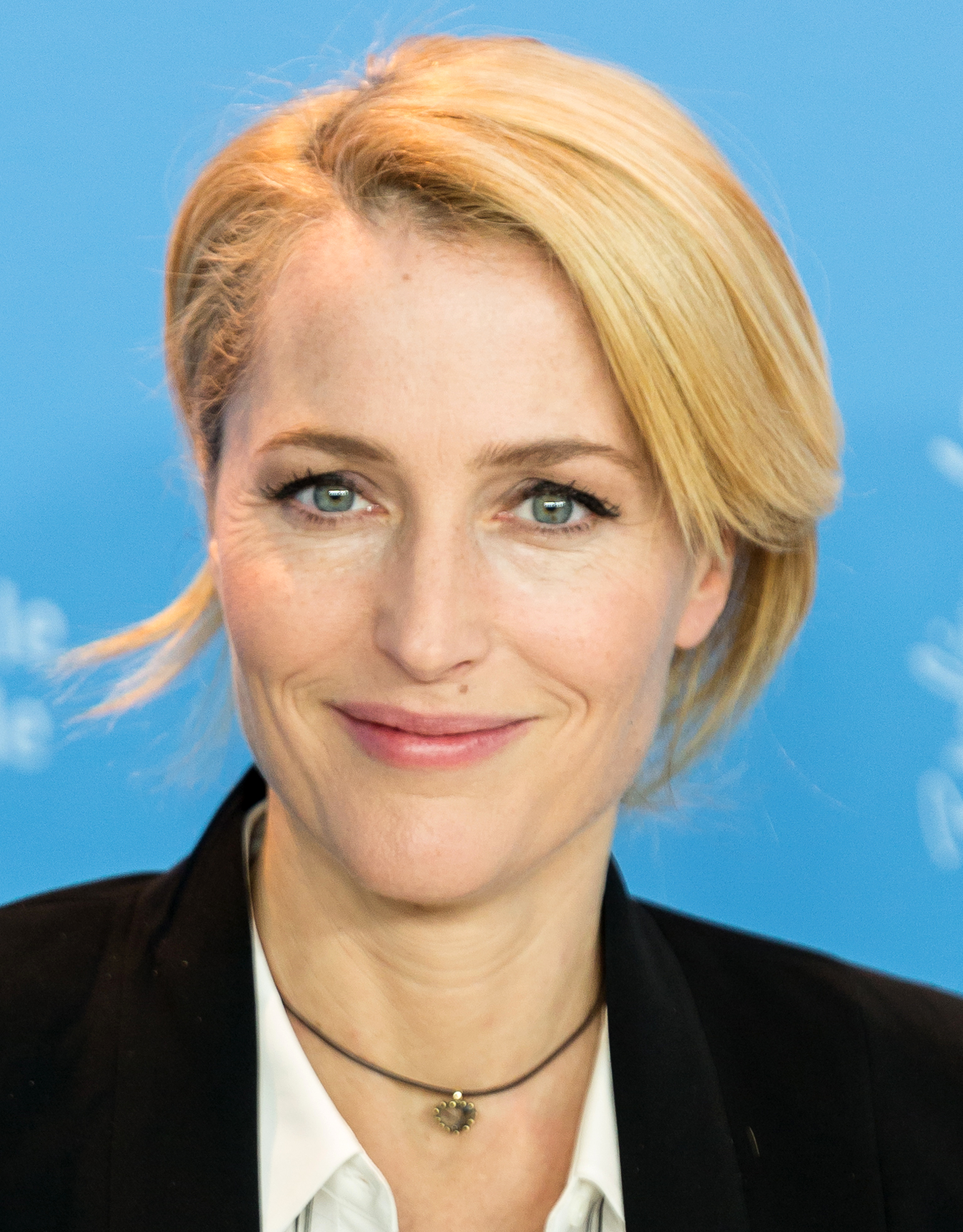
Gillian Anderson

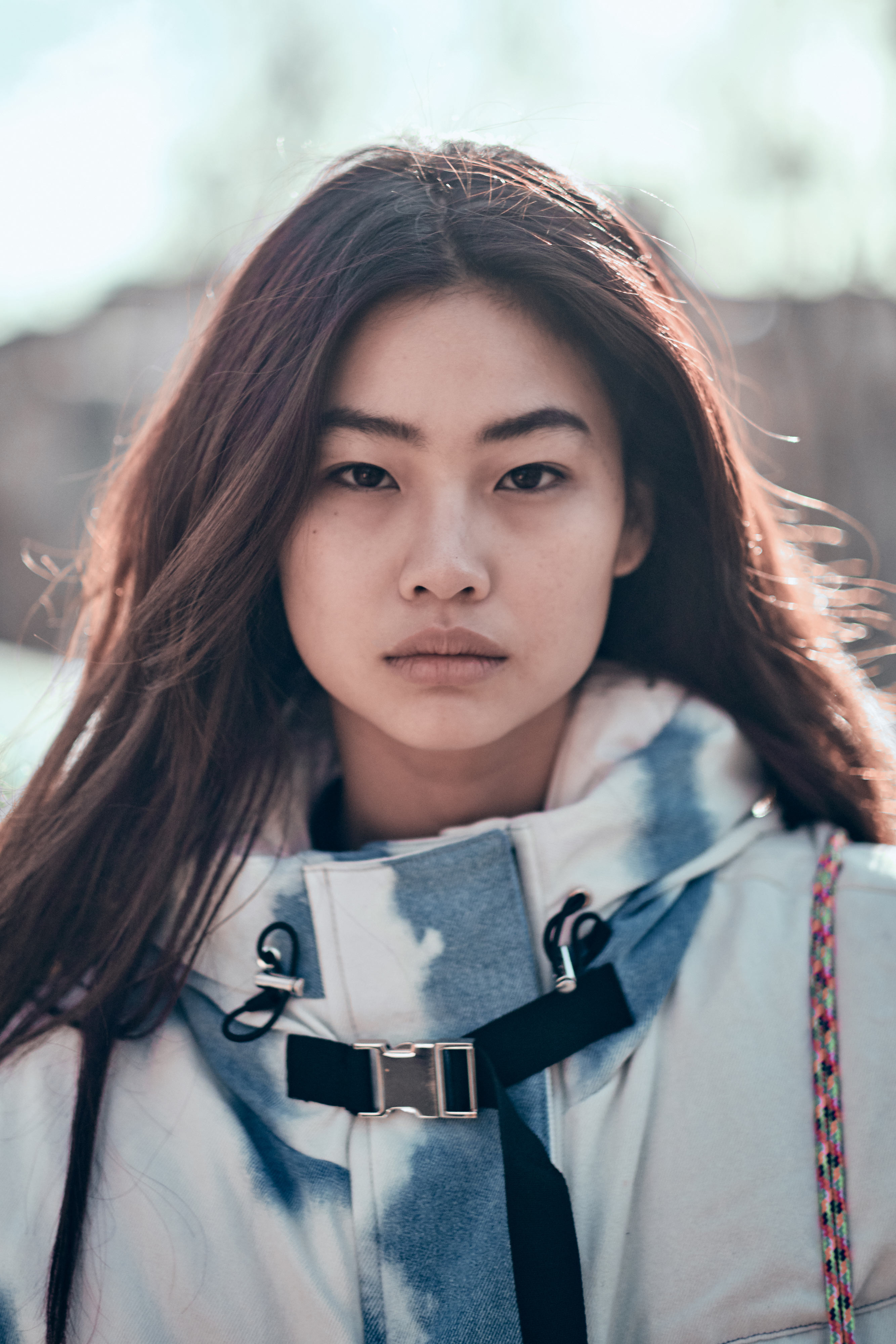
HoYeon Jung

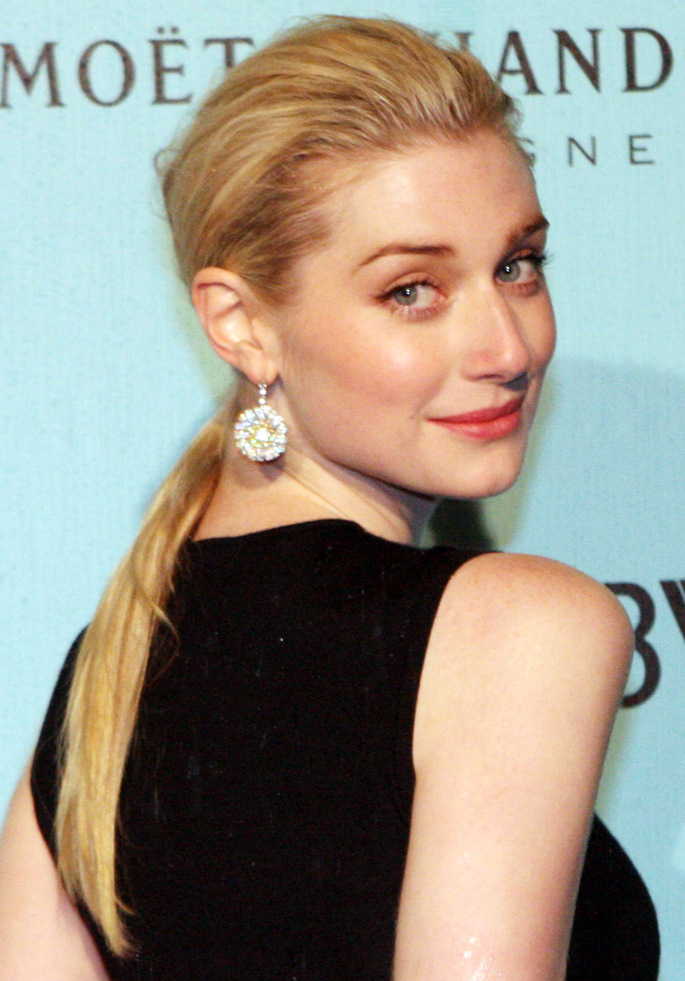
Elizabeth Debicki

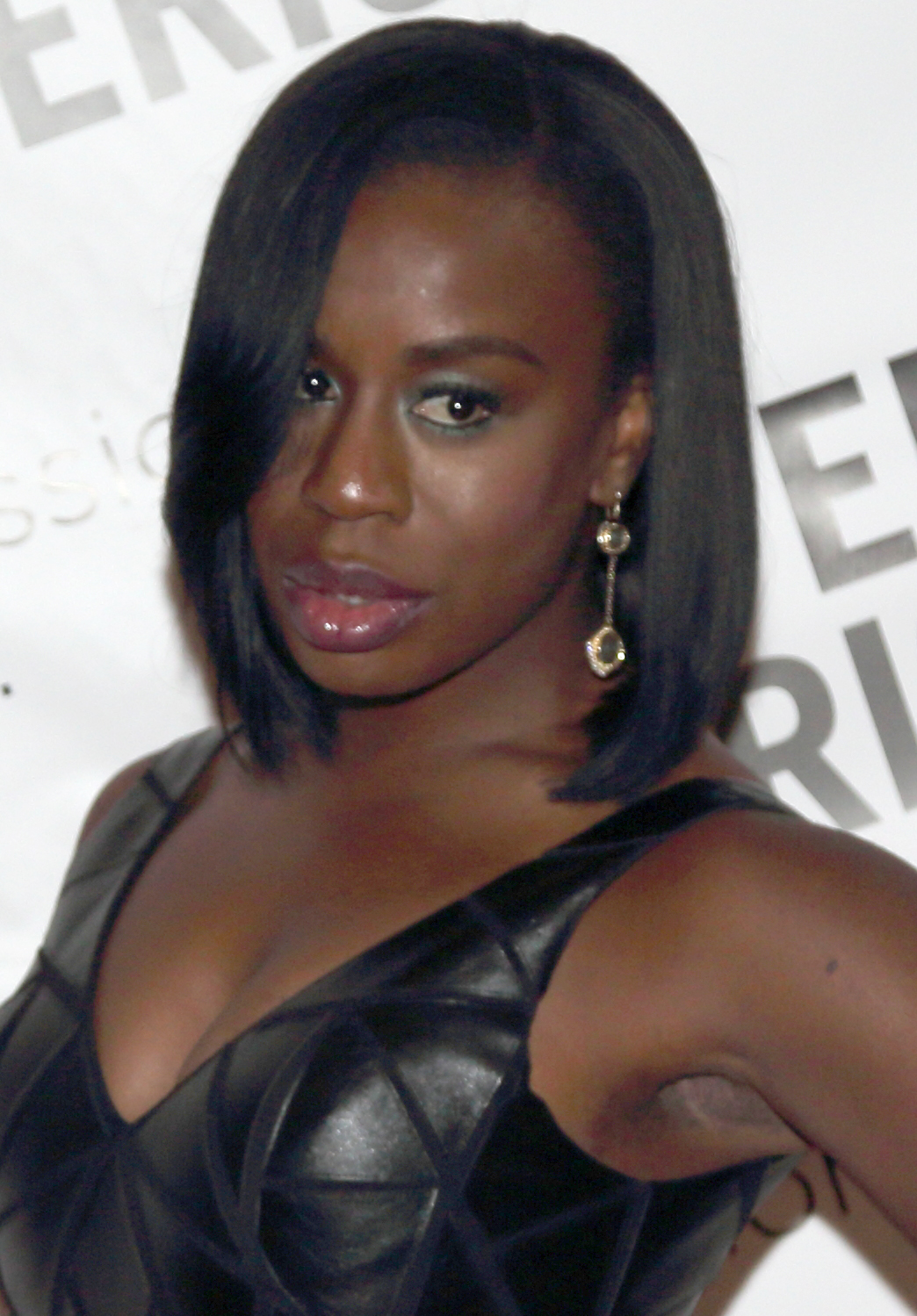
Uzo Aduba

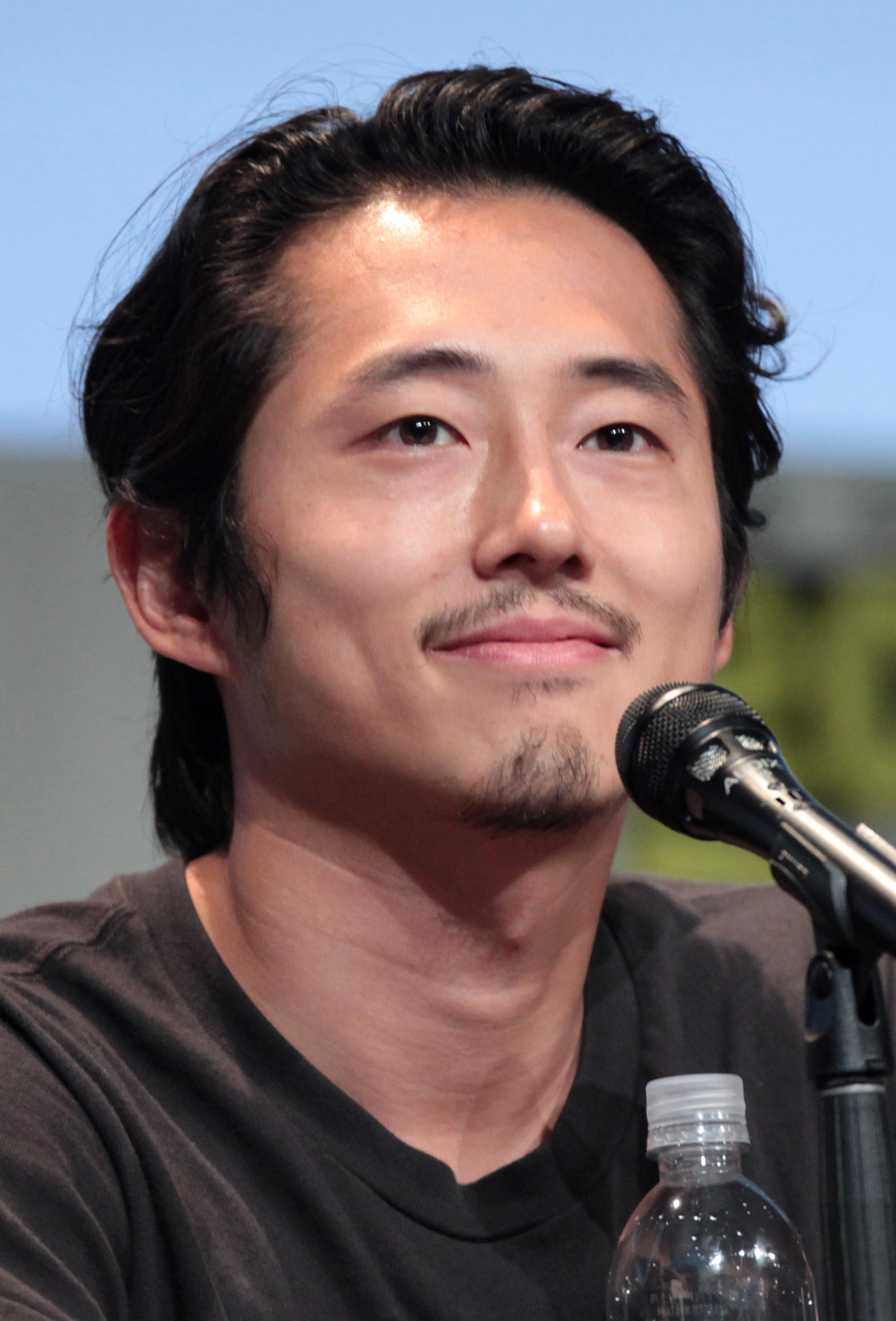
Steven Yeun

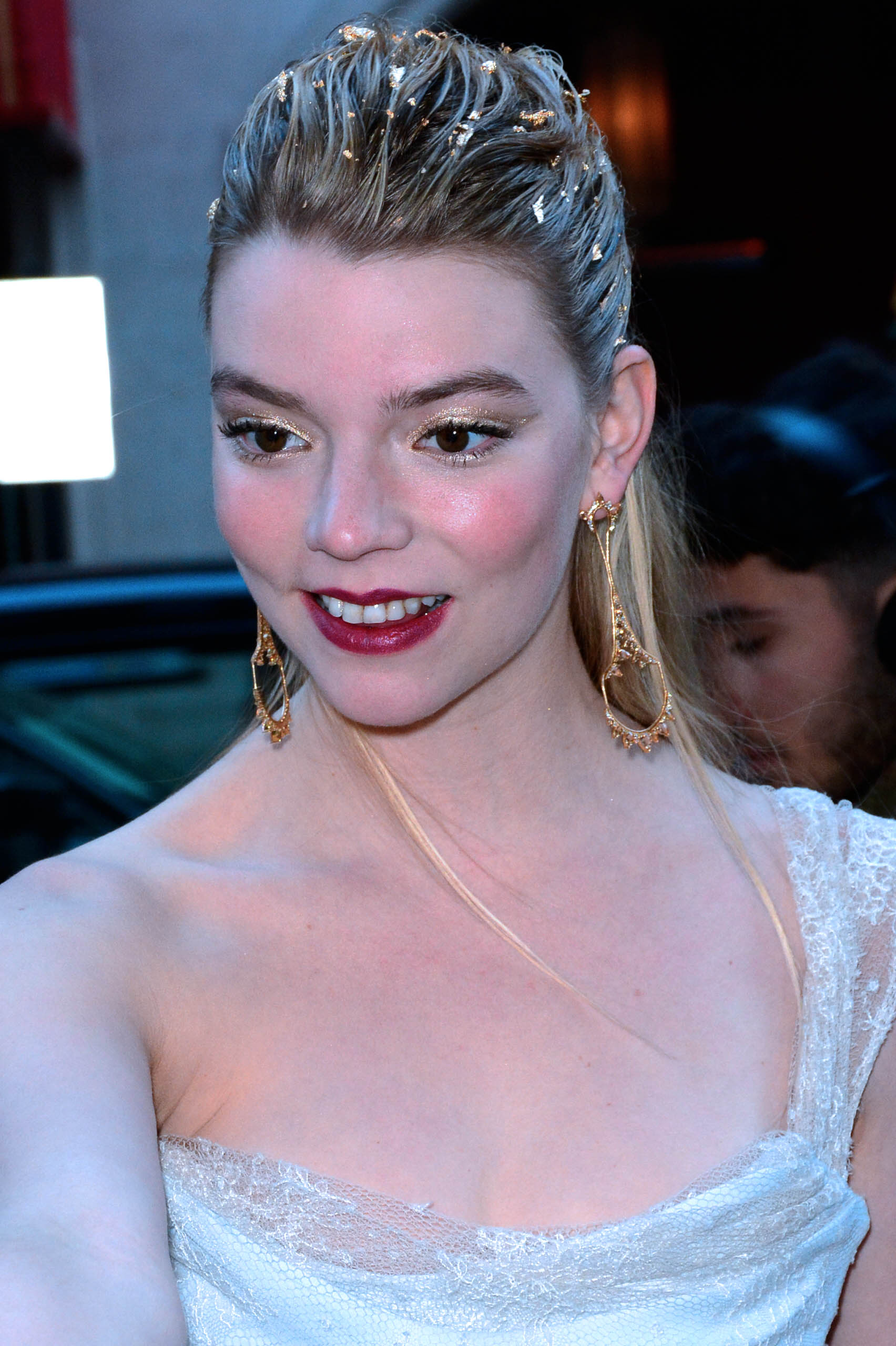
Anya Taylor-Joy

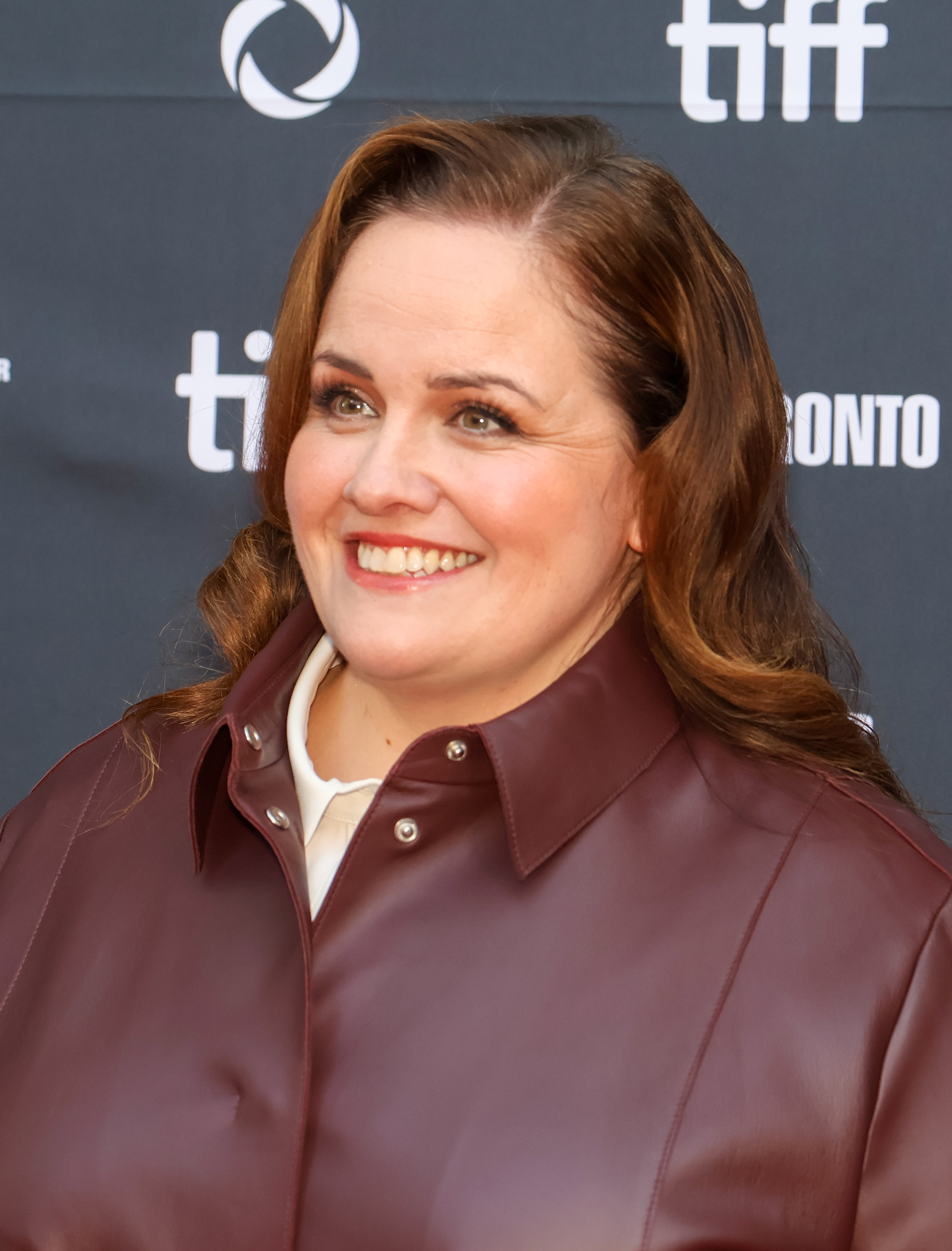
Jessica Gunning

=== Male Actor in a Drama Series ===
Outstanding Performance by a Male Actor in a Drama Series
Year	Actor	Program	Season	Result	Ref.
2014	Kevin Spacey	House of Cards	Season 1	Nominated	
2015	Kevin Spacey	House of Cards	Season 2	Won	
2016	Kevin Spacey	House of Cards	Season 3	Won	
2017	John Lithgow	The Crown	Season 1	Won	
2017	Kevin Spacey	House of Cards	Season 4	Nominated	
2018	Jason Bateman	Ozark	Season 1	Nominated	
2018	David Harbour	Stranger Things	Season 2	Nominated	
2019	Jason Bateman	Ozark	Season 2	Won	
2020	David Harbour	Stranger Things	Season 3	Nominated	
2021	Jason Bateman	Ozark	Season 3	Won	
2021	Josh O'Connor	The Crown	Season 4	Nominated	
2021	Regé-Jean Page	Bridgerton	Season 1	Nominated	
2022	Lee Jung-jae	Squid Game	Season 1	Won	
2023	Jason Bateman	Ozark	Season 4	Won	

=== Female Actor in a Drama Series ===
Outstanding Performance by a Female Actor in a Drama Series
Year	Actor	Program	Season	Result	Ref.
2015	Robin Wright	House of Cards	Season 2	Nominated	
2016	Robin Wright	House of Cards	Season 3	Nominated	
2017	Millie Bobby Brown	Stranger Things	Season 1	Nominated	
2017	Claire Foy	The Crown	Season 1	Won	
2017	Winona Ryder	Stranger Things	Season 1	Nominated	
2017	Robin Wright	House of Cards	Season 4	Nominated	
2018	Millie Bobby Brown	Stranger Things	Season 2	Nominated	
2018	Claire Foy	The Crown	Season 2	Won	
2018	Laura Linney	Ozark	Season 1	Nominated	
2018	Robin Wright	House of Cards	Season 5	Nominated	
2019	Julia Garner	Ozark	Season 2	Nominated	
2019	Laura Linney	Ozark	Season 2	Nominated	
2019	Robin Wright	House of Cards	Season 6	Nominated	
2020	Helena Bonham Carter	The Crown	Season 3	Nominated	
2020	Olivia Colman	The Crown	Season 3	Nominated	
2021	Gillian Anderson	The Crown	Season 4	Won	
2021	Olivia Colman	The Crown	Season 4	Nominated	
2021	Emma Corrin	The Crown	Season 4	Nominated	
2021	Julia Garner	Ozark	Season 3	Nominated	
2021	Laura Linney	Ozark	Season 3	Nominated	
2022	HoYeon Jung	Squid Game	Season 1	Won	
2023	Elizabeth Debicki	The Crown	Season 5	Nominated	
2023	Julia Garner	Ozark	Season 4	Nominated	
2023	Laura Linney	Ozark	Season 4	Nominated	
2024	Elizabeth Debicki	The Crown	Season 6	Won	
2024	Keri Russell	The Diplomat	Season 1	Nominated	
2025	Nicola Coughlan	Bridgerton	Season 3	Nominated	
2025	Allison Janney	The Diplomat	Season 2	Nominated	
2025	Keri Russell	The Diplomat	Season 2	Nominated	

=== Male Actor in a Comedy Series ===
Outstanding Performance by a Male Actor in a Comedy Series
Year	Actor	Program	Season	Result	Ref.
2014	Jason Bateman	Arrested Development	Season 4	Nominated	
2017	Tituss Burgess	Unbreakable Kimmy Schmidt	Season 2	Nominated	
2018	Aziz Ansari	Master of None	Season 2	Nominated	
2018	Marc Maron	GLOW	Season 1	Nominated	
2019	Alan Arkin	The Kominsky Method	Season 1	Nominated	
2019	Michael Douglas	The Kominsky Method	Season 1	Nominated	
2020	Alan Arkin	The Kominsky Method	Season 2	Nominated	
2020	Michael Douglas	The Kominsky Method	Season 2	Nominated	
2022	Michael Douglas	The Kominsky Method	Season 3	Nominated	
2025	Adam Brody	Nobody Wants This	Season 1	Nominated	
2025	Ted Danson	A Man on the Inside	Season 1	Nominated	

=== Female Actor in a Comedy Series ===
Outstanding Performance by a Female Actor in a Comedy Series
Year	Actor	Program	Season	Result	Ref.
2015	Uzo Aduba	Orange Is the New Black	Season 2	Won	
2016	Uzo Aduba	Orange Is the New Black	Season 3	Won	
2016	Ellie Kemper	Unbreakable Kimmy Schmidt	Season 1	Nominated	
2017	Uzo Aduba	Orange Is the New Black	Season 4	Nominated	
2017	Jane Fonda	Grace and Frankie	Season 2	Nominated	
2017	Ellie Kemper	Unbreakable Kimmy Schmidt	Season 2	Nominated	
2017	Lily Tomlin	Grace and Frankie	Season 2	Nominated	
2018	Uzo Aduba	Orange Is the New Black	Season 5	Nominated	
2018	Alison Brie	GLOW	Season 1	Nominated	
2018	Jane Fonda	Grace and Frankie	Season 3	Nominated	
2018	Lily Tomlin	Grace and Frankie	Season 3	Nominated	
2019	Alison Brie	GLOW	Season 2	Nominated	
2019	Jane Fonda	Grace and Frankie	Season 4	Nominated	
2019	Lily Tomlin	Grace and Frankie	Season 4	Nominated	
2020	Christina Applegate	Dead to Me	Season 1	Nominated	
2021	Christina Applegate	Dead to Me	Season 2	Nominated	
2021	Linda Cardellini	Dead to Me	Season 2	Nominated	
2022	Sandra Oh	The Chair	Season 1	Nominated	
2023	Christina Applegate	Dead to Me	Season 3	Nominated	
2023	Jenna Ortega	Wednesday	Season 1	Nominated	
2025	Kristen Bell	Nobody Wants This	Season 1	Nominated	

=== Male Actor in a Miniseries or Television Movie ===
Outstanding Performance by a Male Actor in a Miniseries or Television Movie
Year	Actor	Program	Result	Ref.
2018	Jeff Daniels	Godless	Nominated	
2020	Jharrel Jerome	When They See Us	Nominated	
2021	Bill Camp	The Queen's Gambit	Nominated	
2022	Ewan McGregor	Halston	Nominated	
2023	Evan Peters	Dahmer – Monster: The Jeffrey Dahmer Story	Nominated	
2024	Steven Yeun	Beef	Won	
2025	Javier Bardem	Monsters: The Lyle and Erik Menendez Story	Nominated	
2025	Richard Gadd	Baby Reindeer	Nominated	
2025	Andrew Scott	Ripley	Nominated	

=== Female Actor in a Miniseries or Television Movie ===
Outstanding Performance by a Female Actor in a Miniseries or Television Movie
Year	Actor	Program	Result	Ref.
2017	Bryce Dallas Howard	Black Mirror: Nosedive	Nominated	
2019	Emma Stone	Maniac	Nominated	
2020	Toni Collette	Unbelievable	Nominated	
2021	Anya Taylor-Joy	The Queen's Gambit	Won	
2022	Margaret Qualley	Maid	Nominated	
2023	Julia Garner	Inventing Anna	Nominated	
2023	Niecy Nash	Dahmer – Monster: The Jeffrey Dahmer Story	Nominated	
2024	Ali Wong	Beef	Won	
2024	Uzo Aduba	Painkiller	Nominated	
2025	Jessica Gunning	Baby Reindeer	Won	

== Performances in Film ==
SAG Award Winners

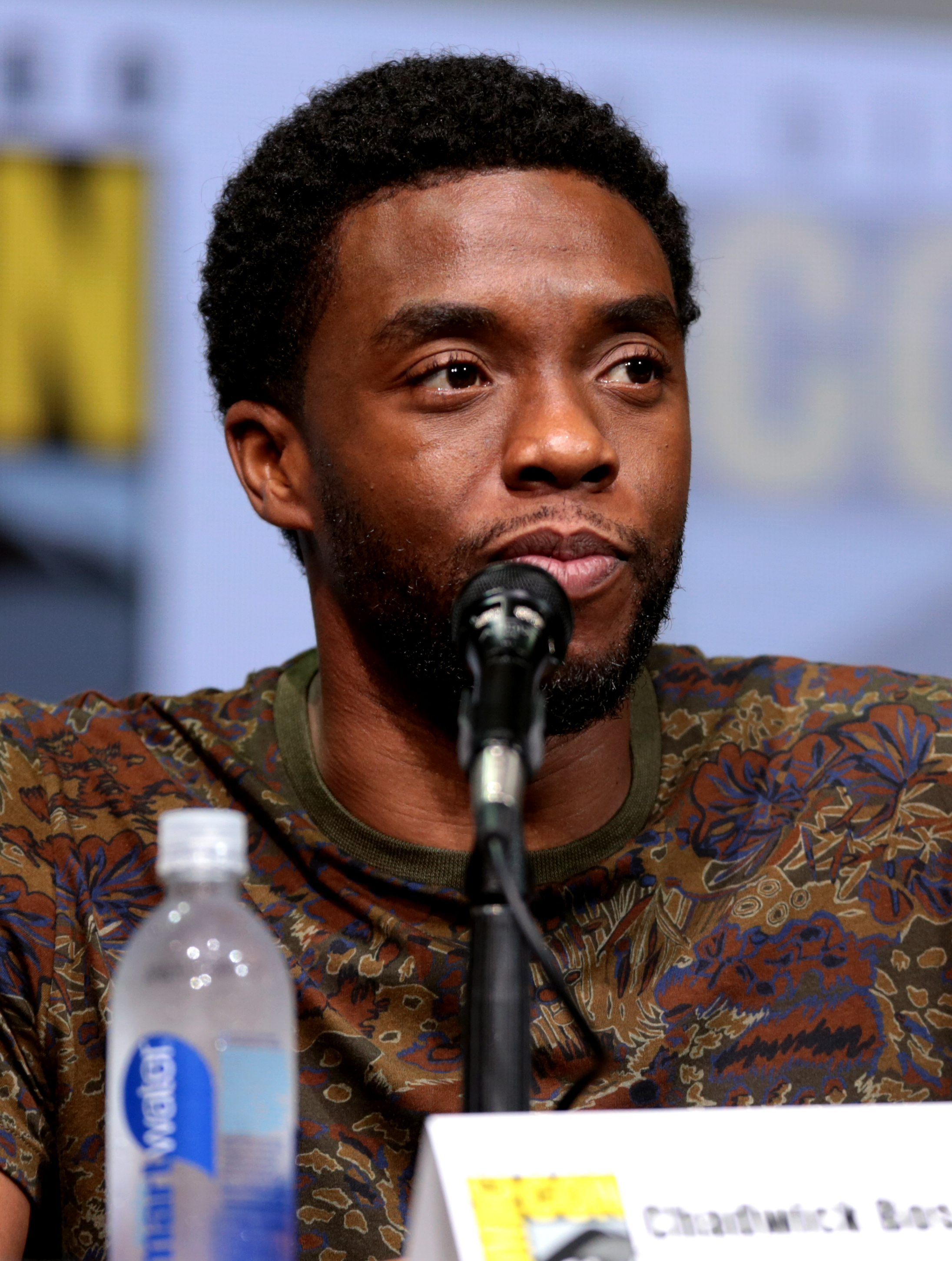
Chadwick Boseman

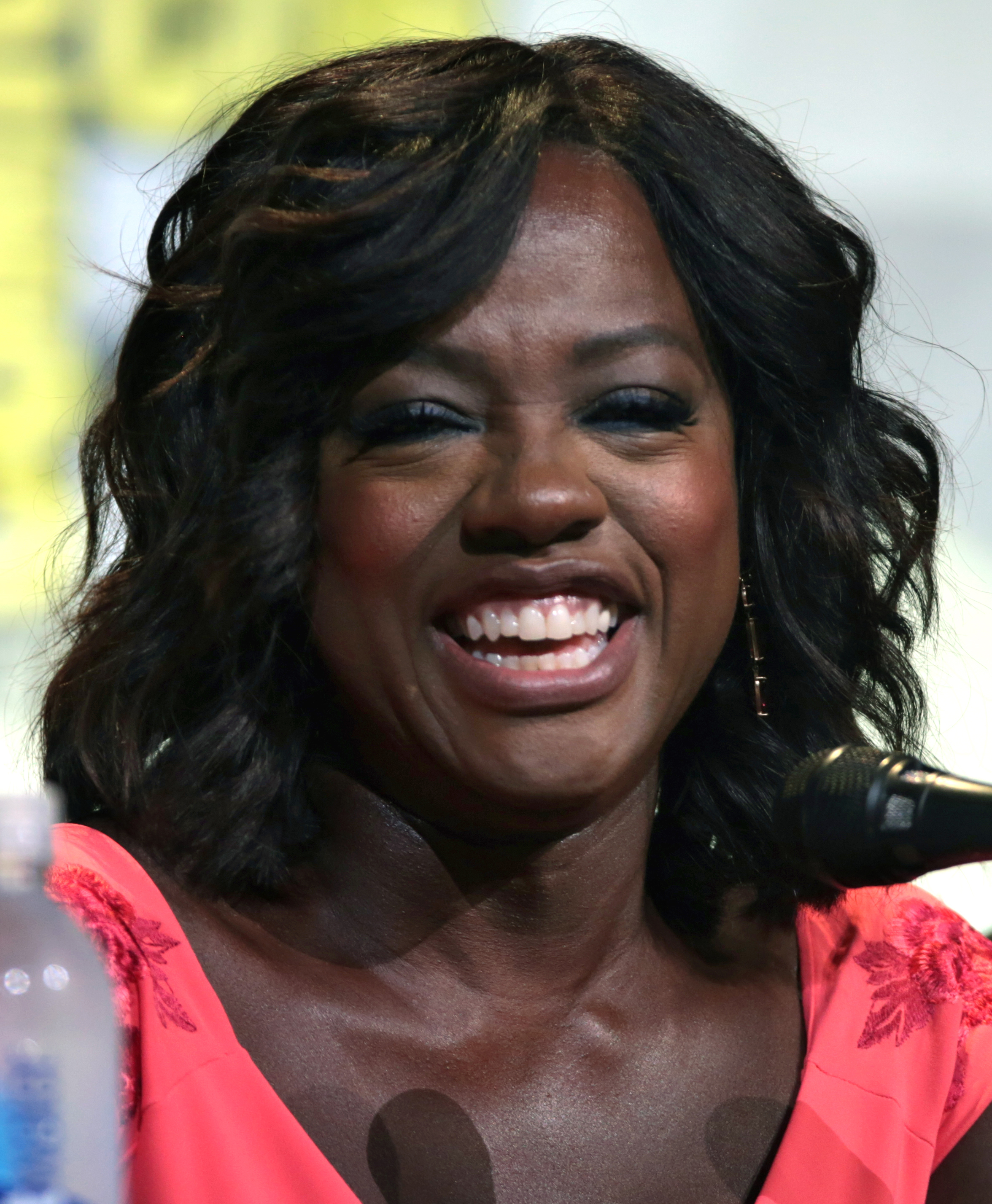
Viola Davis

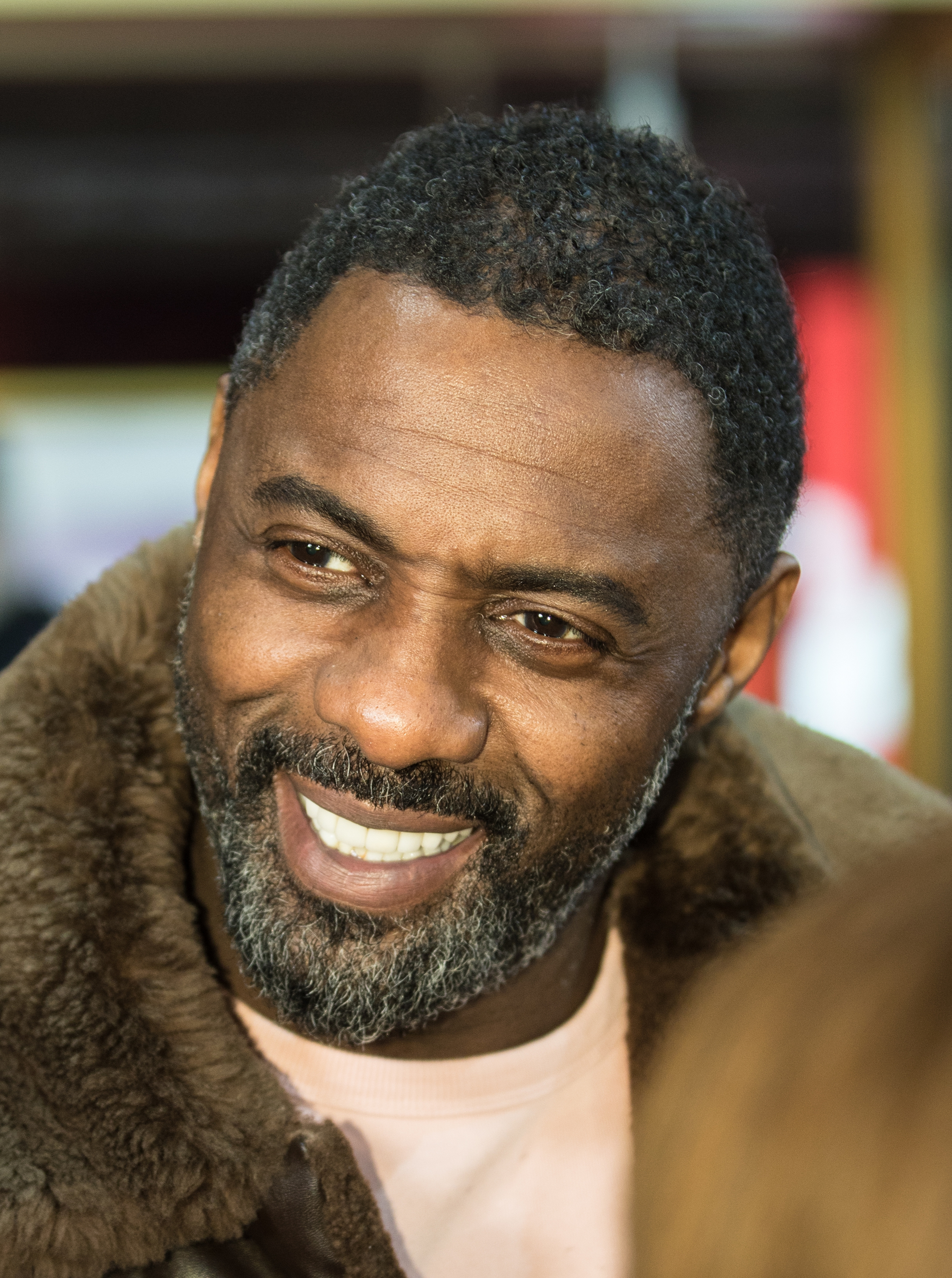
Idris Elba

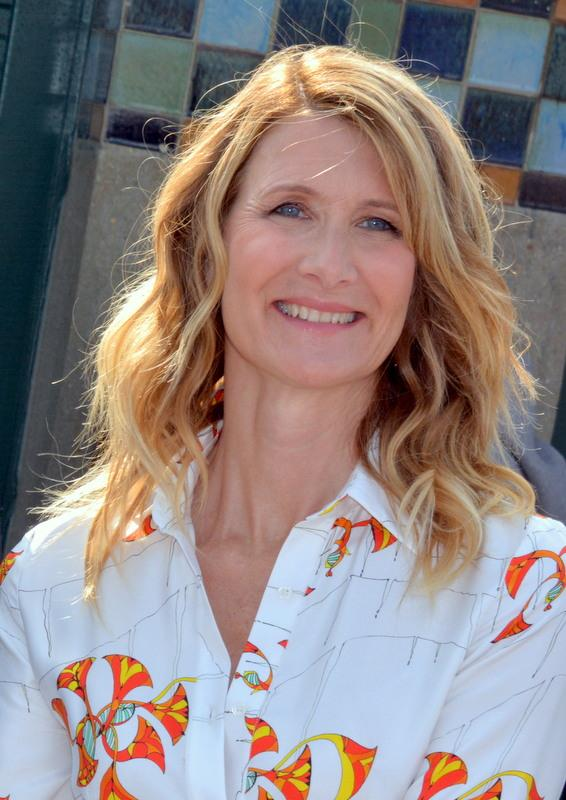
Laura Dern

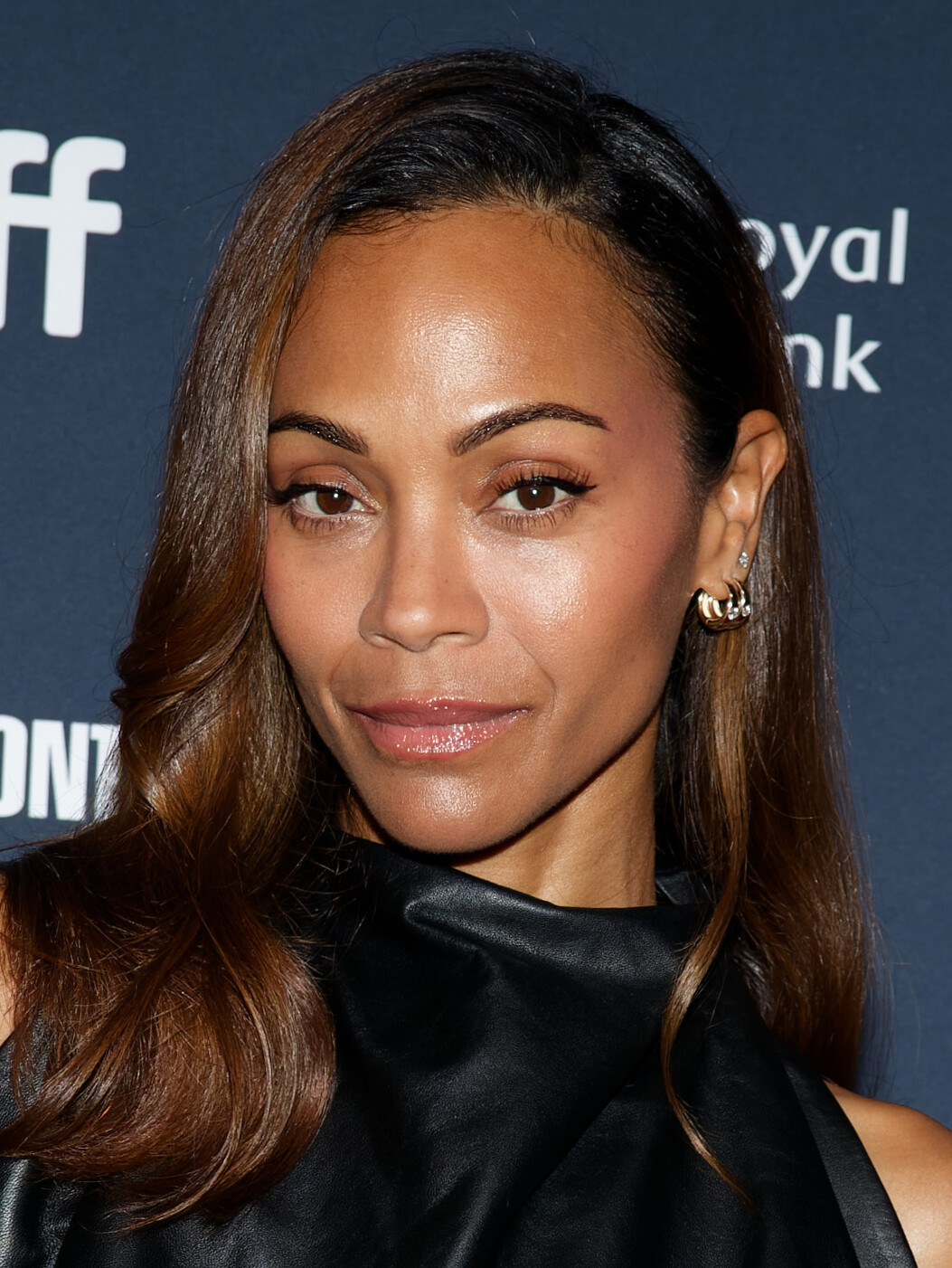
Zoe Saldaña

=== Male Actor in a Leading Role ===
Outstanding Performance by Male Actor in a Leading Role
Year	Actor	Film	Result	Ref.
2020	Adam Driver	Marriage Story	Nominated	
2021	Chadwick Boseman	Ma Rainey's Black Bottom	Won	
2021	Gary Oldman	Mank	Nominated	
2022	Benedict Cumberbatch	The Power of the Dog	Nominated	
2022	Andrew Garfield	tick, tick... Boom!	Nominated	
2023	Adam Sandler	Hustle	Nominated	
2024	Bradley Cooper	Maestro	Nominated	
2024	Colman Domingo	Rustin	Nominated	

=== Female Actor in a Leading Role ===
Outstanding Performance by Female Actor in a Leading Role
Year	Actor	Film	Result	Ref.
2020	Scarlett Johansson	Marriage Story	Nominated	
2021	Amy Adams	Hillbilly Elegy	Nominated	
2021	Viola Davis	Ma Rainey's Black Bottom	Won	
2021	Vanessa Kirby	Pieces of a Woman	Nominated	
2022	Olivia Colman	The Lost Daughter	Nominated	
2023	Ana de Armas	Blonde	Nominated	
2024	Annette Bening	Nyad	Nominated	
2024	Carey Mulligan	Maestro	Nominated	
2025	Karla Sofía Gascón	Emilia Pérez	Nominated	

=== Male Actor in a Supporting Role ===
Outstanding Performance by Male Actor in a Supporting Role
Year	Actor	Film	Result	Ref.
2016	Idris Elba	Beasts of No Nation	Won	
2020	Al Pacino	The Irishman	Nominated	
2020	Joe Pesci	The Irishman	Nominated	
2021	Sacha Baron Cohen	The Trial of the Chicago 7	Nominated	
2021	Chadwick Boseman	Da 5 Bloods	Nominated	
2022	Kodi Smit-McPhee	The Power of the Dog	Nominated	
2023	Eddie Redmayne	The Good Nurse	Nominated	

=== Female Actor in a Supporting Role ===
Outstanding Performance by Female Actor in a Supporting Role
Year	Actor	Film	Result	Ref.
2018	Mary J. Blige	Mudbound	Nominated	
2020	Laura Dern	Marriage Story	Won	
2021	Glenn Close	Hillbilly Elegy	Nominated	
2021	Helena Zengel	News of the World	Nominated	
2022	Kirsten Dunst	The Power of the Dog	Nominated	
2022	Ruth Negga	Passing	Nominated	
2024	Jodie Foster	Nyad	Nominated	
2025	Zoe Saldaña	Emilia Pérez	Won	
2025	Danielle Deadwyler	The Piano Lesson	Nominated	

== See also ==
Main

- List of accolades received by Netflix

Others

- List of TCA Awards received by Netflix
- List of BAFTA Awards received by Netflix
- List of Golden Globe Awards received by Netflix
- List of Daytime Emmy Awards received by Netflix
- List of Primetime Emmy Awards received by Netflix
- List of Critics' Choice Television Awards received by Netflix
- List of Primetime Creative Arts Emmy Awards received by Netflix
