= 33rd TCA Awards =

US television awards ceremony in 2017

- Date: August 5, 2017
- Venue: The Beverly Hilton, Beverly Hills, California
- Hosted by: Kristin Chenoweth

Highlights
- Program of the Year: The Handmaid's Tale
- Outstanding New Program: This Is Us

The 33rd TCA Awards were held on August 5, 2017, in a ceremony hosted by Kristin Chenoweth at The Beverly Hilton in Beverly Hills, California. The nominees were announced by the Television Critics Association on June 19, 2017.

== Winners and nominees ==
Category	Winner	Nominees
Program of the Year	The Handmaid's Tale (Hulu)	Atlanta (FX); Big Little Lies (HBO); The Leftovers (HBO); Stranger Things (Netflix); This Is Us (NBC)
Outstanding Achievement in Comedy	Atlanta (FX)	Black-ish (ABC); Fleabag (Amazon); The Good Place (NBC); Master of None (Netflix); Veep (HBO)
Outstanding Achievement in Drama	The Handmaid's Tale (Hulu)	The Americans (FX); Better Call Saul (AMC); The Crown (Netflix); Stranger Things (Netflix); This Is Us (NBC)
Outstanding Achievement in Movies, Miniseries and Specials	Big Little Lies (HBO)	Fargo (FX); Feud: Bette and Joan (FX); Gilmore Girls: A Year in the Life (Netflix); The Night Of (HBO); The Wizard of Lies (HBO)
Outstanding New Program	This Is Us (NBC)	Atlanta (FX); The Crown (Netflix); The Good Place (NBC); The Handmaid's Tale (Hulu); Stranger Things (Netflix)
Individual Achievement in Comedy	Donald Glover – Atlanta (FX)	Pamela Adlon – Better Things (FX); Aziz Ansari – Master of None (Netflix); Kristen Bell – The Good Place (NBC); Julia Louis-Dreyfus – Veep (HBO); Issa Rae – Insecure (HBO); Phoebe Waller-Bridge – Fleabag (Amazon)
Individual Achievement in Drama	Carrie Coon – Fargo (FX) & The Leftovers (HBO)	Sterling K. Brown – This Is Us (HBO); Claire Foy – The Crown (Netflix); Nicole Kidman – Big Little Lies (HBO); Jessica Lange – Feud: Bette and Joan (FX); Elisabeth Moss – The Handmaid's Tale (Hulu); Susan Sarandon – Feud: Bette and Joan (FX)
Outstanding Achievement in News and Information	O.J.: Made in America (ESPN)	Full Frontal with Samantha Bee (TBS); Last Week Tonight with John Oliver (HBO); The Lead with Jake Tapper (CNN); Planet Earth II (BBC America); Weiner (Showtime)
Outstanding Achievement in Reality Programming	Leah Remini: Scientology and the Aftermath (A&E)	The Circus (Showtime); The Great British Baking Show (PBS); The Keepers (Netflix); Shark Tank (ABC); Survivor: Game Changers (CBS)
Outstanding Achievement in Youth Programming	Speechless (ABC)	Daniel Tiger's Neighborhood (PBS); Doc McStuffins (Disney Junior); Elena of Avalor (Disney Channel); Odd Squad (PBS); Sesame Street (HBO)
Heritage Award	Seinfeld (NBC)	
Career Achievement Award	Ken Burns	

=== Multiple wins ===
The following shows received multiple wins:

Nominations	Recipient
2	Atlanta
2	The Handmaid's Tale

=== Shows with multiple nominations ===
The following shows received multiple nominations:

Nominations	Recipient
4	Atlanta
4	The Handmaid's Tale
4	This Is Us
3	Big Little Lies
3	The Crown
3	Feud: Bette and Joan
3	The Good Place
3	Stranger Things
2	Fargo
2	Fleabag
2	The Leftovers
2	Master of None
2	Veep
