= 34th TCA Awards =

US television awards ceremony in 2018

- Date: August 4, 2018
- Venue: The Beverly Hilton, Beverly Hills, California
- Hosted by: Robin Thede

Highlights
- Program of the Year: The Americans
- Outstanding New Program: Killing Eve

The TCA Awards held their 34th awards ceremony on August 4, 2018, in a ceremony hosted by Robin Thede at The Beverly Hilton in Beverly Hills, California. The nominees were announced by the Television Critics Association on June 19, 2018.

== Winners and nominees ==
Category	Winner	Nominees
Program of the Year	The Americans (FX)	Atlanta (FX); The Good Place (NBC); The Handmaid's Tale (Hulu); Killing Eve (BBC America); This Is Us (NBC)
Outstanding Achievement in Comedy	The Good Place (NBC)	Atlanta (FX); Barry (HBO); GLOW (Netflix); The Marvelous Mrs. Maisel (Amazon); One Day at a Time (Netflix)
Outstanding Achievement in Drama	The Americans (FX)	The Crown (Netflix); The Good Fight (CBS All Access); The Handmaid's Tale (Hulu); Killing Eve (BBC America); This Is Us (NBC)
Outstanding Achievement in Movies, Miniseries and Specials	The Assassination of Gianni Versace: American Crime Story (FX)	Alias Grace (Netflix); Howards End (Starz); Patrick Melrose (Showtime); The Tale (HBO); Twin Peaks: The Return (Showtime)
Outstanding New Program	Killing Eve (BBC America)	Barry (HBO); Counterpart (Starz); GLOW (Netflix); The Marvelous Mrs. Maisel (Amazon); Mindhunter (Netflix)
Individual Achievement in Comedy	Rachel Brosnahan – The Marvelous Mrs. Maisel (Amazon)	Pamela Adlon – Better Things (FX); Rachel Bloom – Crazy Ex-Girlfriend (The CW); Ted Danson – The Good Place (NBC); Donald Glover – Atlanta (FX); Bill Hader – Barry (HBO)
Individual Achievement in Drama	Keri Russell – The Americans (FX)	Jodie Comer – Killing Eve (BBC America); Darren Criss – The Assassination of Gianni Versace: American Crime Story (FX); Elisabeth Moss – The Handmaid's Tale (Hulu); Sandra Oh – Killing Eve (BBC America); Matthew Rhys – The Americans (FX)
Outstanding Achievement in News and Information	Anthony Bourdain: Parts Unknown (CNN)	60 Minutes (CBS); Blue Planet II (BBC America); The Rachel Maddow Show (MSNBC); The Vietnam War (PBS); Wild Wild Country (Netflix)
Outstanding Achievement in Sketch/Variety Shows	Last Week Tonight with John Oliver (HBO)	Full Frontal with Samantha Bee (TBS); Jimmy Kimmel Live (ABC); Late Night with Seth Meyers (NBC); The Late Show with Stephen Colbert (CBS); Saturday Night Live (NBC)
Outstanding Achievement in Reality Programming	Queer Eye (Netflix)	The Great British Baking Show (PBS); Nailed It! (Netflix); Project Runway (Lifetime); RuPaul's Drag Race (VH1)
Outstanding Achievement in Youth Programming	Sesame Street (HBO)	Daniel Tiger's Neighborhood (PBS Kids); Elena of Avalor (Disney Channel); Muppet Babies (Disney Junior); Odd Squad (PBS Kids); Sofia the First (Disney Junior)
Heritage Award	Friends (NBC)	
Career Achievement Award	Rita Moreno	

=== Multiple wins ===
The following shows received multiple wins:

Wins	Recipient
3	The Americans

=== Shows with multiple nominations ===
The following shows received multiple nominations:

Nominations	Recipient
5	Killing Eve
4	The Americans
3	Atlanta
3	Barry
3	The Good Place
3	The Handmaid's Tale
3	The Marvelous Mrs. Maisel
2	The Assassination of Gianni Versace: American Crime Story
2	GLOW
2	This Is Us
