= Black pool =

Form of pocket billiards

Black pool, originally known as everlasting pool, was a form of pocket billiards (pool) mainly played in the late 19th century, first being recorded in 1862. This game was derived from life pool but lacked the pooling of bets and players had unlimited lives. It had as many colour balls as players with an additional black ball that was placed on the centre spot. A player is paid a life (stake) from the opponent whose ball was potted. The player is then allowed to pot the black ball which meant all opponents must pay a life. Balls are respotted after being potted and the best strategy is to alternate potting colour and black to maximize money. Around 1875, black pool was merged with pyramid pool to form the new game of snooker, today one of the most popular cue sports in the world.
