= Bottle pool =

Billiards game

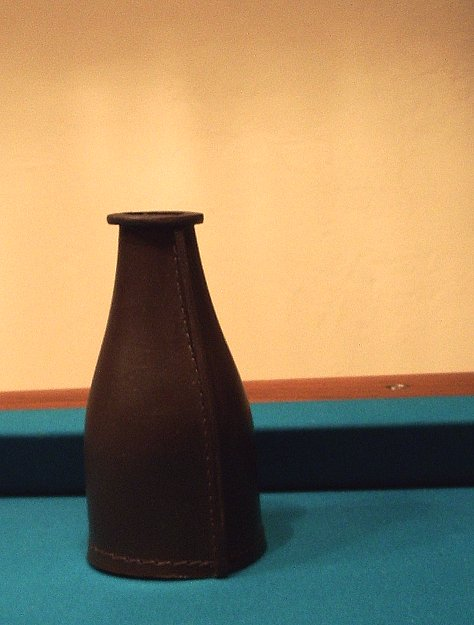
The leather shake bottle used as a carom target in bottle pool.

Bottle pool (also known as bottle billiards) is a billiards game. It combines aspects of both carom and pocket billiards. Played on a standard pool table, the game utilizes three balls and a narrow-necked bottle called a shake or tally bottle. The bottle is traditionally made from leather, and is placed on the table and used as a target for caroms. Those unfamiliar with the game sometimes mistakenly use its name as a synonym for the very different game of kelly pool.

Although bottle pool's origins remain obscure, tournament records and newspaper articles confirm that the game has been played since at least the late 19th century. A mention appears in an 1894 article in The New York Times announcing a 64-player tournament to be played at a certain Hanover Clubhouse in Brooklyn, New York. The game was more well known in the early-to-mid-20th century, during which references to it appear in numerous books and publications including Sinclair Lewis's Main Street. It is also known to have been played by some notable individuals, such as quantum chemist and biochemist Linus Pauling.

Over time bottle pool developed an elitist image, its active play more commonly the province of gentlemen's clubs and select groups than patrons of billiard parlors. For instance, bottle pool is known to have had a dedicated following with faculty at the University of Michigan from 1911 until approximately 1999, and is the billiard game of choice at exclusive New York City enclaves such as the Racquet and Tennis Club and the Union Club.

Despite being one of a short group of non-championship games still detailed in the Official Rules and Records Book of the Billiard Congress of America, as of 2006, bottle pool was known only to be the billiard sport of general choice at a few New York City social clubs such as the two mentioned previously. A veteran member of both those clubs opined in 2006 that there were then fewer than 1,000 dedicated bottle pool players nationwide.

Bottle pool has been described as combining "elements of billiards, straight pool and chess under a set of rules that lavishly rewards strategic shot making and punishes mistakes with Sisyphean point reversals."

== General rules (Billiard Congress of America) ==
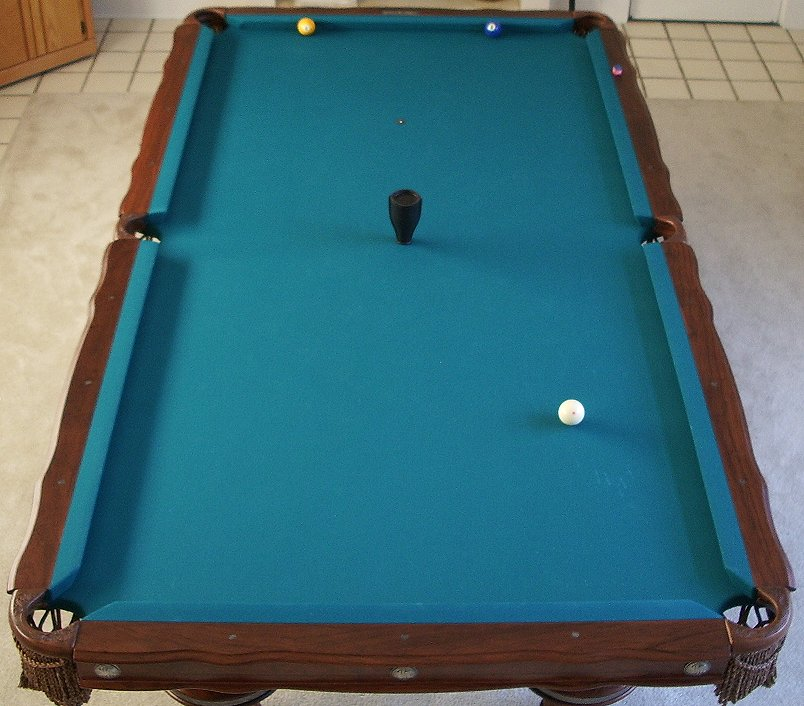
The initial set up for bottle pool

=== Set up ===
At the start of bottle pool, the shake bottle is placed inverted (neck down) on the center spot at the geographic center of the bed of a pool table. The two object balls used are the 1 ball and the 2 ball. Viewed from the racker's vantage point, the 1 ball is frozen to the diamond on the foot rail immediately adjacent to the right corner pocket, and the 2 ball to the diamond on the foot rail immediately adjacent to the left corner pocket.

The player breaking starts with cue ball in hand from the kitchen (behind the head string) and must contact either of the two object balls in order to complete a legal break. The object of the game is to score exactly 31 points before any opponents, with a draconian penalty for overshooting that benchmark.

=== Scoring ===
Points are scored in bottle pool in the following ways:

- Pocketing the 1 ball scores 1 point;
- Pocketing the 2 ball scores 2 points;
- Caroming the cue ball off both object balls scores 1 point;
- Caroming the cue ball off one or both object balls and then into the bottle knocking it onto its side scores 5 points;
- Caroming the cue ball off one or both object balls and then into the bottle knocking onto its base results in an automatic win.

All of the above scoring possibilities can be combined, meaning the maximum number of points available on a single stroke is nine, accomplished by caroming into and pocketing both object balls combined with knocking over the bottle with the cue ball.

The winning shot in the game (other than one which rights the shake bottle) must bring a player's score to exactly 31. If a player overshoots that benchmark, known as a "burst" in the game's terminology, the number of points 31 is overshot by becomes the player's new score. This means, for example, that if a player has 30 points and then scores 5 points (instead of the requisite 1 point) by caroming the cue ball off an object ball and into the bottle knocking it on its side, the player's score resets to 4 points.

When a player reaches exactly 31 points, he must announce this feat to all participants before the next player shoots a shot in order to be victorious. If this is not done, the player may not again invoke his winning score until his turn comes up again in rotation. If another player in the interim successfully scores exactly 31, and properly announces it, that player wins the game.

=== Illegal shots and fouls ===
Any legally made scoring shot entitles a player to continue shooting. The penalty for a foul in the game is a loss of turn, any point-scoring acts made on the same stroke are not counted, and 1 point is deducted from the player's total score. The incoming player after a foul accepts the table in position except if the cue ball is jumped off the table or a scratch occurs, in which case the incoming player has ball-in-hand from the kitchen. Three consecutive fouls in bottle pool results in a loss of game.

In addition to standard fouls defined in the General Rules for Pocket Billiards, such as scratches, push shots, double hits and others, the following are specifically defined fouls peculiar to bottle pool:

- The cue ball fails to touch an object ball;
- The cue ball touches the bottle before contacting an object ball;
- The bottle is knocked over by an object ball;
- An object ball is pocketed on the same stroke as an illegal shot.

Illegal shots which are not fouls unless a ball is pocketed on the same stroke (thus resulting in a loss of turn, no score, but not a loss of points), include:

- Causing an object ball to touch the bottle at all before the cue ball touches it (without knocking it over);
- Causing the bottle to go into a pocket or off the table as a result of action by the cue ball, after it has caromed off an object ball.

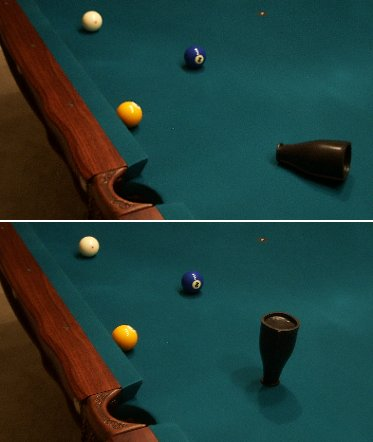
Montage showing how the shake bottle is righted upside down as close as possible to its knocked over resting position, as judged by the mouth of the bottle.

=== Bottle and ball spotting rules ===
Whenever the shake bottle is knocked over it is immediately stood up open end down as close as possible to the position on the table at which it came to rest after being upset, as judged from the mouth of the bottle. When the shake bottle is knocked into a pocket, off the table, or where the open end of the bottle intrudes over a pocket opening such that it is impossible to replace it to its upset resting position, the shake bottle is replaced to the table's center spot. If the center spot is occupied by any ball, then it is placed on the head spot. If both the center and head spots are occupied, then it is placed on the foot spot. If none of the listed spots are available then it remains off the table until such time as the center spot becomes unobstructed.

As in the games of snooker, English billiards, cowboy pool and others, pocketed balls are immediately respotted to their starting position. Where the second object ball, the cue ball or the bottle makes spotting the ball there impossible, it is spotted to the center spot. If the center spot is occupied, the ball is spotted to the head spot. Where both object balls have been potted on a shot, they are spotted with the same dictates for just one ball, first spotting the 1 ball, followed by the 2 ball. Thus, if the starting positions for the two object balls are each occupied, respectively by the cue ball and shake bottle, the 1 ball would be placed on the center spot and the 2 ball on the head spot.

== Variations ==
The game is sometimes played with the larger and heavier (and unnumbered) carom billiard balls instead of pocket billiard balls. Such is the case at the Union Club and was also at the University of Michigan Billiards & Games Room, where the faculty devoted most of their time to bottle pool. Not incidentally three-cushion billiards, which uses these larger balls, was also a mainstay in that room and touring three-cushion professional Carl Conlon was a fixture there until his death in 1997. In this variation, a solid-yellow (or dotted) second cue ball is used in place of the 1 ball, and the red ball, known traditionally as the carombola, is used in place of the 2 ball. The use of such balls makes scoring by caroms easier, but makes pocketing balls (and scratching) more difficult because the larger balls must still be made in the ordinarily-sized pool pockets.

The rules promulgated by the Manhattan Athletic Club in the 1890s diverge in a number of ways from the modern rules published by the BCA (though they do use the numbered 1 and 2 balls, rather than carom billiards balls). Those house rules provide that when a player bursts, his score is set to zero rather than to the number of points 31 is overshot; pocketed object balls are replaced on the "red-ball spot" (the foot spot), or if occupied, frozen to the foot rail in the original position of the 1 ball and if occupied, of the 2 ball; and no foul rules whatever are preferred.

One further variation places a 6-sided die (although other sided die could also be used) on top of the bottle. If the bottle is knocked over and the die knocked onto the table, the player is awarded points equal to whatever side of the die lies facing upward when the die comes to a stop. This adds a random effect to hitting the bottle and in practice often results in players only striking the bottle in combination with other point-scoring shots.
