= Fifteen-ball =

Fifteen-ball, fifteenball, 15 ball, or 15-ball may refer to:

- 15 ball, the pool (pocket billiards) ball numbered "15", and traditionally colored with a brown or maroon stripe, but a tan stripe in some ball sets
- Fifteen-ball pool, a pocket billiards game covered in the Billiard Congress of America rulebook
- Rotation (pool), sometimes called fifteen-ball, a pocket billiards game (different from the above), played with fifteen object balls that are shot at in numerical order, and of which the 15 ball is the game-winning ball
- 15-ball, a fifteen-dimensional n-ball in mathematics
