= Life pool =

Form of pocket billiards

Life pool (also known as 3 lives Snooker) is a form of pocket billiards (pool) that was mainly played in the 19th century. Its rules were first recorded in 1819 simply as pool, which remained its most common name among the British for about a century. In the United States, it was also simply called pool in the mid-19th century. It was one of several pool games that were popular at this time (so called because gamblers pooled their bets at the start of play). The object of the game is to be the last player left "alive" and therefore scoop the pool (take the winnings). Each player has three "lives" to begin with and loses one when another player pots their coloured ball which was designated to them at the start of the game. Using the same number of balls as players, players take turns striking their designated ball with the cue in an attempt to collide that ball with one (or more) of their opponents' balls knocking the opponent ball into a pocket. Once a player loses their three lives, they are declared "dead", i.e. out of the game. The game continues in this way until there is only one player left, who is declared the winner. Around 1862, life pool spawned black pool, an ancestor of snooker, today one of the most popular cue sports in the world.
