= Four-ball =

Four-ball (and variant spellings four ball, fourball, 4 ball, 4-ball, etc.) may refer to:

- 4 ball, the pool (pocket billiards) ball numbered "4"
- 4 ball, the brown snooker ball, worth 4 points, normally referred to as "the brown"
- Four-ball billiards, a carom billiards game played in variations around the world
- Cowboy pool, sometimes referred to as American four-ball pool or four-ball for short
- Four-ball golf (a.k.a. best ball, or better ball), a type of golf match used in match-play competitions
- 4-ball (mathematics), a four-dimensional n-ball in mathematics
