= Pool (cue sports) =

Family of cue sports

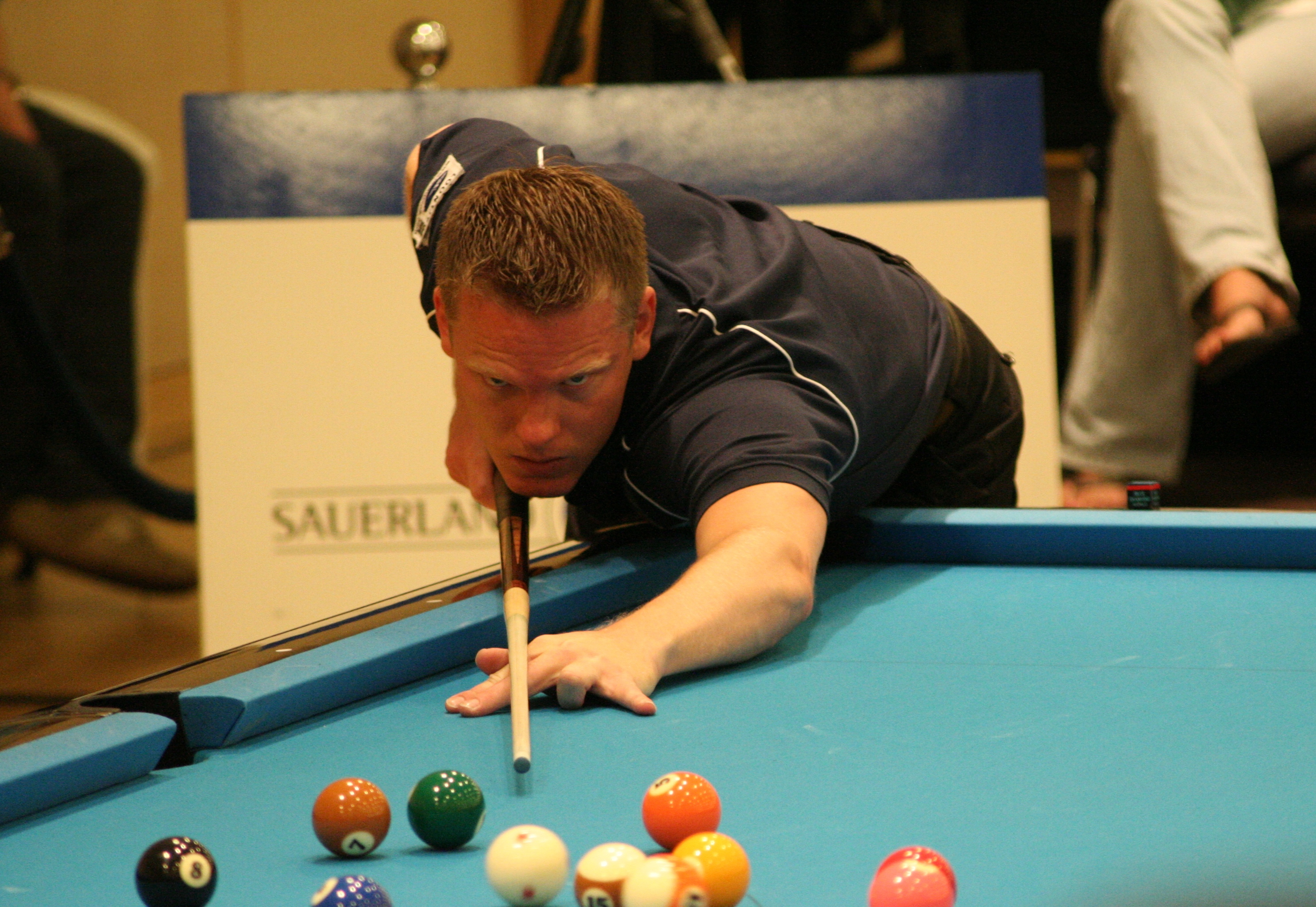
Dutch pool player Niels Feijen at the 2008 European Pool Championship

A player setting a rack

Pool is a group of cue sports played on a billiard table. The table has six pockets along the rails, into which balls are shot. Of the many different pool games, the most popular include: eight-ball, blackball, nine-ball, ten-ball, seven-ball, straight pool, one-pocket, and bank pool. Eight-ball is the most frequently played discipline of pool, and it is often thought of as synonymous with "pool".

The generic term pocket billiards is sometimes also used, and favored by some pool-industry bodies, but is technically a broader classification, including games such as snooker, Russian pyramid, and Kaisa, which are not referred to as pool games. There are also hybrid games combining aspects of both pool and carom billiards, such as American four-ball billiards, bottle pool, cowboy pool, and English billiards.

== Etymology ==
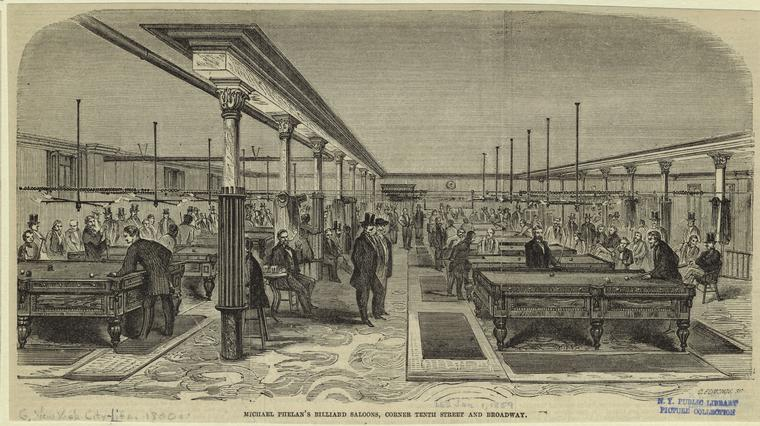
Historic print depicting Michael Phelan's billiard saloon in New York City, 1 January 1859.

The etymology of "pool" is uncertain. The Oxford English Dictionary speculates that "pool" and other games with collective stakes is derived from the French poule (literally translated "hen"), in which the poule is the collected prize, originating from jeu de la poule, a game that is thought to have been played during the Middle Ages. Supposedly, participants would put an equal amount of money into a pot and throw stones at a live chicken, and the person who successfully hit the chicken first would win the pooled money. Alternatively the term could derive from the verb to pool in the sense of combining objects or stakes. The oldest use of the word "pool" to describe a billiards-like game was made in 1797 in a Virginia newspaper. The OED defines it as generally "any of various types of billiards for two or more players" but goes on to note that the first specific meaning of "a game in which each player uses a cue ball of a distinctive colour to pocket the balls of the other player(s) in a certain order, the winner taking all the stakes submitted at the start of the contest" is now obsolete, and its other specific definitions are all for games that originate in the United States. In the British Empire for most of the nineteenth through early twentieth century, pool referred specifically to the game of life pool.

Although skittle pool is played on a pocketless carom billiards table, the term pool later stuck to all new games of pocket billiards as the sport gained in popularity in the United States, and so outside the cue sports industry, which has long favored the more formal term pocket billiards, the common name for the sport has remained pool. The OxfordDictionaries.com definition no longer even provides the obsolete meaning found in the print edition, and refers only to the typical game "using two sets [each] of seven coloured and numbered balls ... with one black ball and a white cue ball" on a table with pockets.

== History ==
With the exception of one-pocket, games typically called "pool" today are descended from two English games imported to the United States during the 19th century. The first was English billiards which became American four-ball billiards, essentially the same game but with an extra red object ball to increase scoring opportunities. It was the most popular billiards game in the mid-19th century until dethroned by the carom game straight rail. American four-ball tournaments tried switching to carom tables in the 1870s but this did not save it from being doomed to obscurity; the last professional tournament was held in 1876. Cowboy pool is a surviving member of this group of games.

The second and more influential game was pyramid pool. By 1850 a variant called fifteen-ball pool became popular. Both games were supplanted by continuous pool in 1888, the immediate forerunner of straight pool (1910). New games introduced at the turn of the 20th century include Kelly pool and eight-ball. The distinctive appearance of pool balls with their many colors and division between solid and striped balls came about by 1889. Prior to this, object balls were uniformly deep-red and differentiated only by numbers. English pyramid pool and life pool players were the first to adopt balls with different colors. The stripes were the last addition.

== Equipment ==
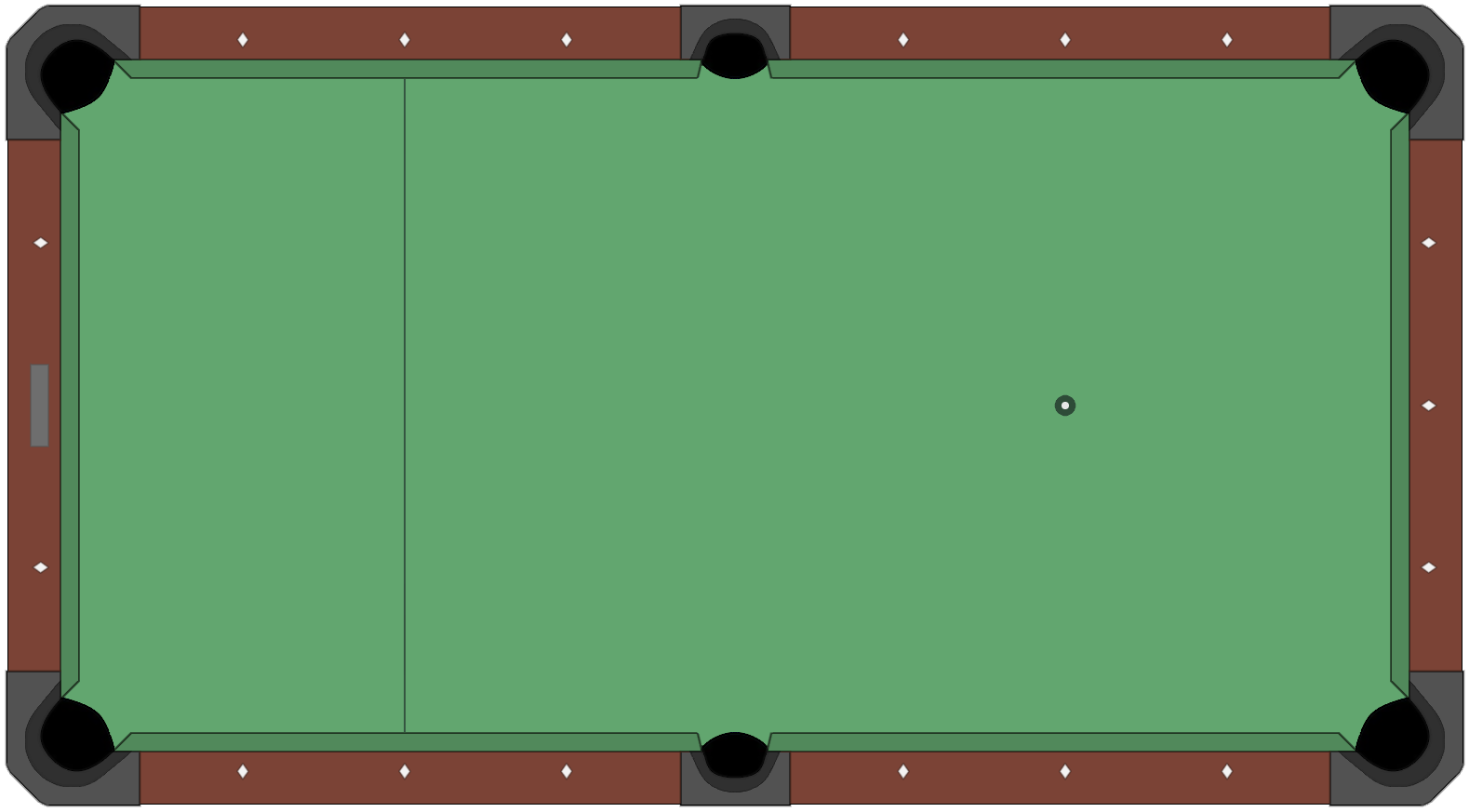
A pool table diagram

Pool is played on a six pocket table. Modern pool tables generally range in size from 3.5 by 7 feet (1.07 by 2.13 m), to 4.5 by 9 feet (1.37 by 2.74 m).

Under World Pool-Billiard Association (WPA) official equipment specifications, pool balls weigh from 5.5 to 6 oz (160 to 170 g) and have a diameter of 2.25 inches (57.15 mm), plus or minus 0.005 inches (0.127 mm). Modern coin-operated pool tables generally use one of three methods to distinguish and return the cue ball to the front of the table while the numbered balls return to an inaccessible receptacle until paid for again: the cue ball is larger and heavier than the other balls, or denser and heavier, or has a magnetic core.

Modern cue sticks are generally 58.5 inches (148.6 cm) long for pool while cues prior to 1980 were designed for straight pool and had an average length of 57.5 inches (146.1 cm). By comparison, carom billiards cues are generally shorter with larger tips, and snooker cues longer with smaller tips.

== Game types ==
=== Racked games ===
These are games descended from the early 19th century games of pyramid pool and fifteen-ball pool which required balls to be racked due to the large number of them on the table. Of the other pyramid traditions of Continental Europe, only Russian pyramid survives. Snooker, originally known as snooker's pool, also has roots in pyramid.

==== Rotation games ====
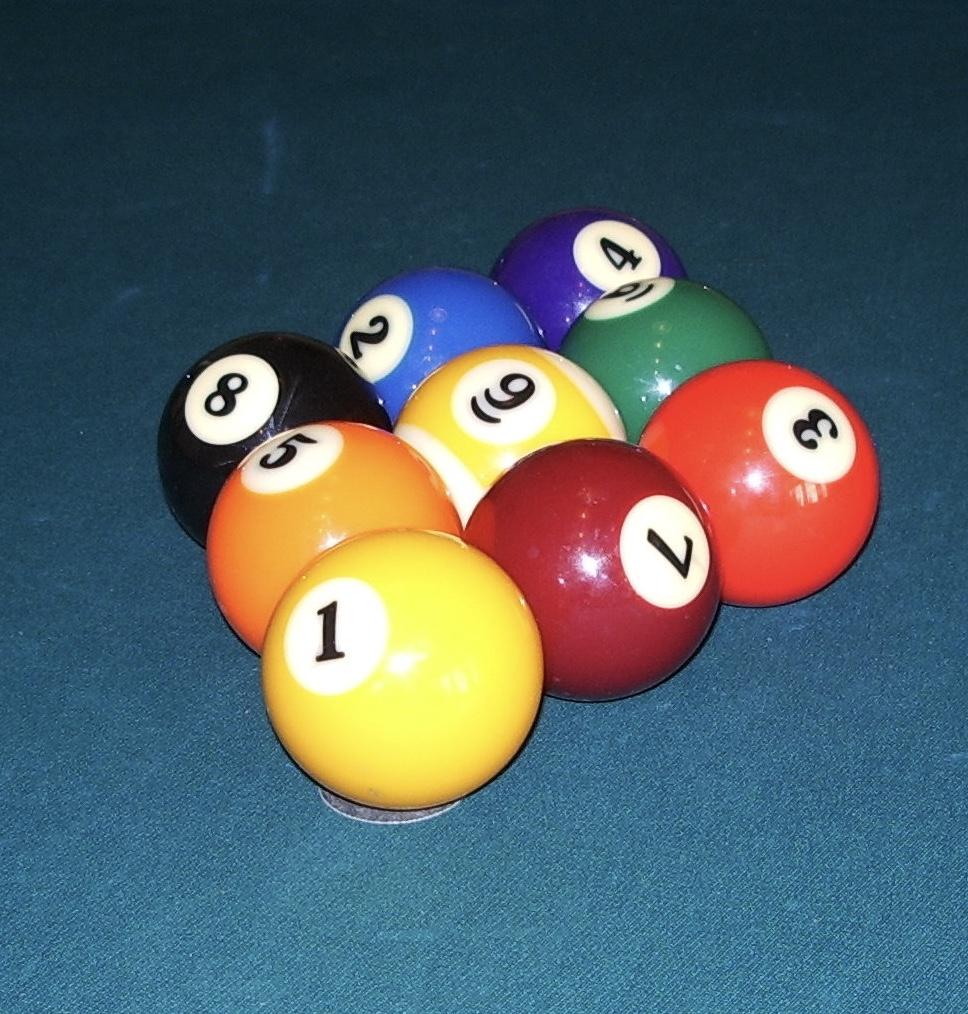
One of many correct nine-ball racks: the 1 ball at the apex centered over the foot spot, the 9 ball at center, the other balls placed randomly, and all balls touching.

Rotation games require players to make legal contact with the lowest numbered ball on the table or a foul is called. The earliest rotation game, originally known as 61, started off as a variant of fifteen-ball pool during the mid-nineteenth century. The name "rotation" came from how the balls were placed around the table in its unracked offshoot Chicago. 61 has spawned many variations of its own such as American rotation, nine-ball, ten-ball, and Kelly pool. Of these, nine-ball is the most popular and the predominant professional game with ten-ball as the second-most prominent. There are many local and regional tours and tournaments that are contested with nine-ball. The World Pool-Billiard Association (WPA) publishes the world standardized rules. The European professional circuit has instituted rules changes to make it more difficult to achieve a legal break shot.

The largest nine-ball tournaments are the US Open Nine-ball Championship and the WPA World Nine-ball Championship for men and women. A hotly contested event is the annual Mosconi Cup, which pits invitational European and U.S. teams against each other in one-on-one and scotch doubles nine-ball matches over a period of several days. The Mosconi Cup games are played under the more stringent European rules, as of 2007.

==== Straight pool ====
Also known as 14.1 continuous, this game originated as a slight modification of continuous pool, another offshoot of fifteen-ball pool. The shooter may attempt to shoot at any object ball on the table. The goal is to reach a set number of points determined by agreement before the game. One point is scored for each object ball pocketed where no foul is made. A typical game might require a player to score 100 points to win. In professional competition, straight pool is usually played to 125 points. Straight pool is a call-pocket game, meaning the player must indicate the intended object ball and pocket on every shot.

==== Eight-ball ====
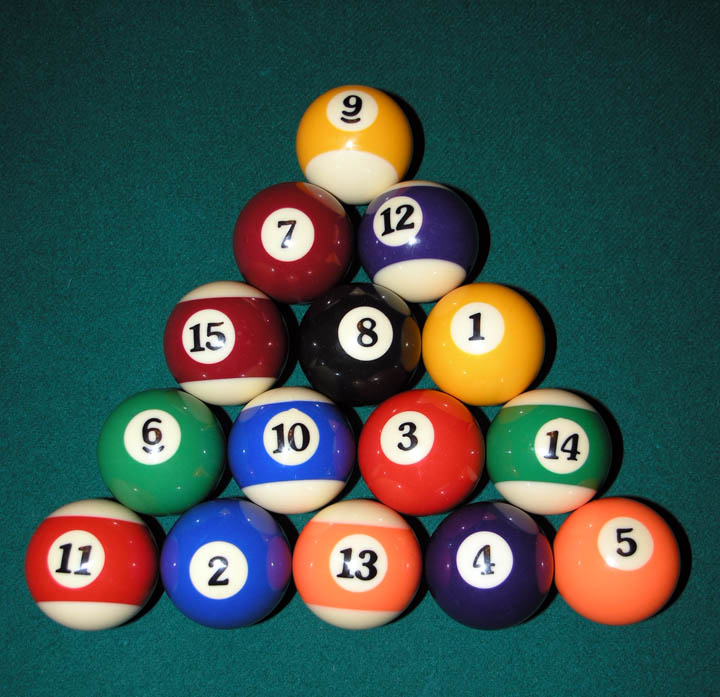
Eight-ball rack: Full rack of fifteen balls, ready for the break shot

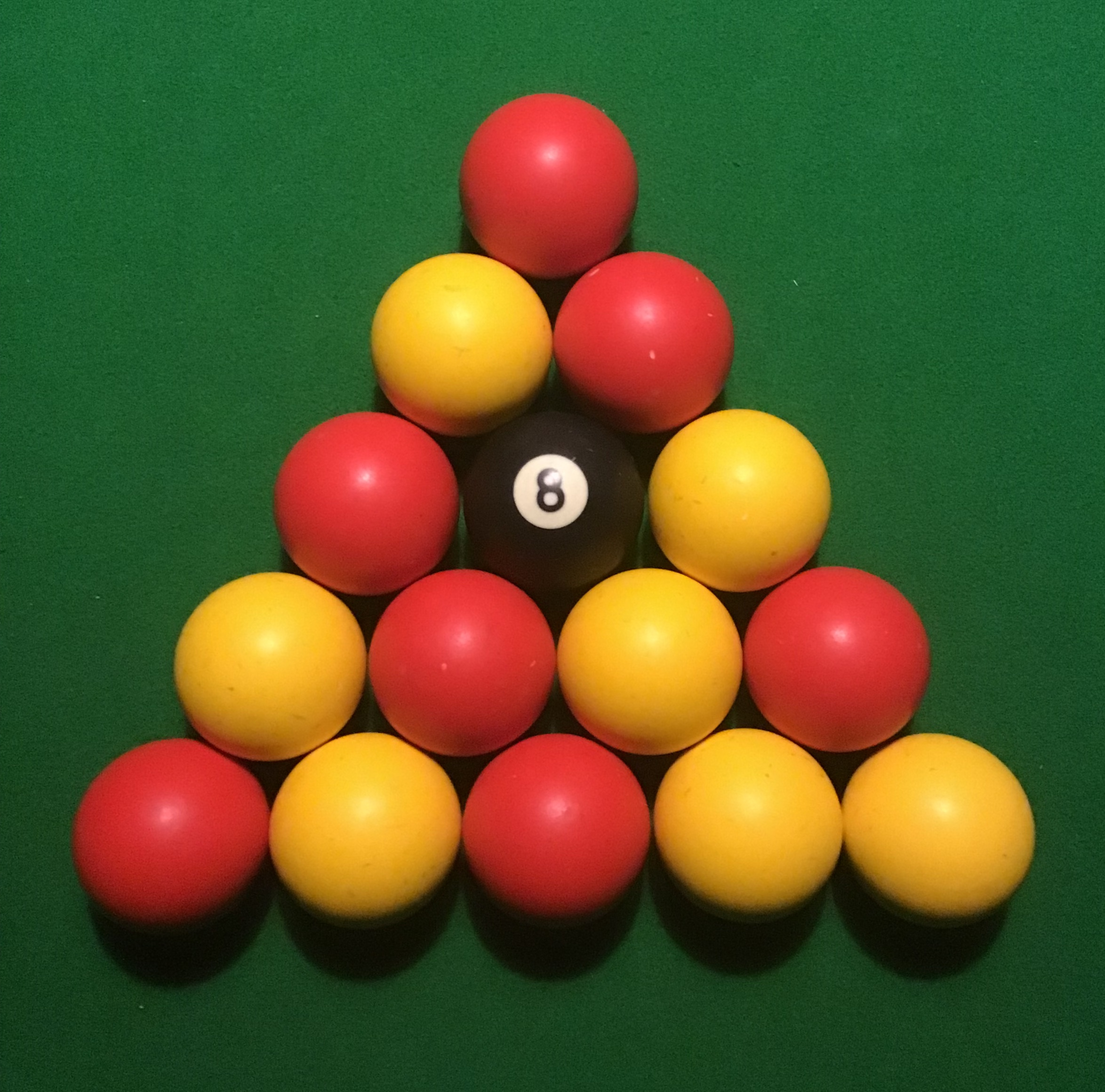
Correct set up for blackball

The most commonly played pool game is eight-ball, which appeared at the beginning of the twentieth century. It is often thought of as synonymous with "pool". The game has numerous variations, mostly regional. It is the second most played professional pool game, after nine-ball, and for the last several decades ahead of straight pool.

The goal of eight-ball, which is played with a full rack of fifteen balls and the cue ball, is to claim a suit (commonly stripes or solids in the US, and reds or yellows in the UK), pocket all of them, then legally pocket the 8 ball, while denying one's opponent opportunities to do the same with their suit, and without sinking the 8 ball early by accident. In the United Kingdom the game is commonly played in pubs, and it is competitively played in leagues on both sides of the Atlantic. The most prestigious tournaments including the World Open are sponsored and sanctioned by the International Pool Tour. Rules vary widely from place to place (and between continents to such an extent that British-style eight-ball pool/blackball is properly regarded as a separate game in its own right). Pool halls in North America are increasingly settling upon the World Pool-Billiard Association International Standardized Rules. But tavern eight-ball (also known as "bar pool"), typically played on smaller, coin-operated tables and in a "winner keeps the table" manner, can differ significantly even between two venues in the same city. The growth of local, regional and national amateur leagues may alleviate this confusion eventually.

==== One-pocket ====
One-pocket owes its origins to 18th century cramp (handicapped) games. It is a strategic game for two players in which each player is assigned one of the corner pockets on the table. This is the only pocket into which that player can legally pocket balls. The first player to pocket the majority of the balls (8) into their pocket wins the game. The game requires far more defensive strategy than offensive strategy, much unlike eight-ball, nine-ball, or straight pool. Most times, accomplished players choose to position balls near their pocket instead of trying to actually pocket them. This allows them to control the game by forcing their opponent to be on defense instead of taking a low percentage shot that could result in a loss of game. These low percentage shots are known as "flyers" by one-pocket aficionados.

==== Bank pool ====
Bank pool can be played with a full rack (can be a long game), but is more typically played with nine balls (frequently called "nine-ball bank"). The balls are racked in nine-ball formation, but in no particular order. The object of the game is simple: to be the first player to bank five balls in any order (eight balls when played with a full rack). Penalties and fouls are similar to one pocket in that the player committing the foul must spot a ball for each foul. This must be done before the incoming player shoots.

=== Artistic pool ===
Artistic pool is the competitive discipline of trick shots inspired by its carom equivalent. Played on pool or snooker tables, players must complete a set number of shots of varying difficulty.

=== Hybrid carom or obstacle games ===
Cowboy pool and bottle pool are games involving only a few balls which are placed at specific spots on the table. Elements of their games go back to the eighteenth century before balls needed to be racked. Bottle pool shares traits with pin billiards games such as Danish pin billiards. Cowboy pool is a descendant of English billiards. Kaisa is a similar game played with different equipment.

== Governing bodies ==
As a competitive sport, pool is governed internationally by the World Pool-Billiard Association (WPA), which has multi-national, regional affiliates comprising the All Africa Pool Association (AAPA), Asian Pocket Billiard Union (APBU, including the Middle East), Billiard Congress of America (BCA, Canada and the US), Confederación Panamericana de Billar (CPB, Latin America and Caribbean), European Pocket Billiard Federation (EPBF, including Russia and the Near East), and Oceania Pocket Billiard Association (OPBA, Australia, New Zealand, Pacific islands). The WPA represents pool in the World Confederation of Billiards Sports, which in turn represents all forms of cue sports (including carom billiards and snooker) in the International Olympic Committee.
