= Kelly pool =

Pool table game

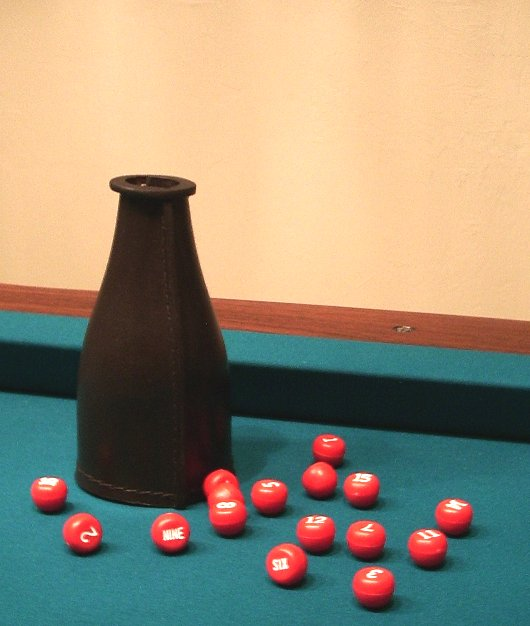
A leather shake bottle and plastic pills or peas as used in kelly pool

Kelly pool (also known as pea pool, pill pool, keeley, the keilley game, and killy) is a pool game played on a standard pool table using a standard set of 16 pool balls. Gameplay involves players each drawing one of 16 numbered markers called peas or pills at random from a shake bottle, which assigns to them the correspondingly numbered pool ball, kept secret from their opponents, but which they must pocket to win the game. Kelly pool is a rotation game, which means that players must contact the lowest numbered object ball on each shot first until the opportunity to pocket their own is presented. If a player draws the number 16, this player is assigned the cue ball. In order to pocket the cue ball, the player must contact the lowest ball first and in the same shot, pocket the cue ball. However, the game is commonly played by removing the pea numbered 16 and playing with the basic 15 numbered balls and corresponding peas. Two rule variants are set forth under rules promulgated by the Billiard Congress of America (BCA). In the simpler form, the object of play starts and ends with the goal of pocketing one's secret ball. In the second, in addition to the goal of pocketing one's secret ball, points are scored in various ways. In the instance where pills are unavailable, a cloth may be used to cover the balls, which are then chosen blindly, recorded, and replaced for play.

Reportedly invented by Chicagoan Calistus "Kelly" Mulvaney in 1893, kelly pool was a popular game during the early to mid-20th century. Mentions of it were at one time common in US newspapers, often painting it in a negative light, as its play was considered a stronghold of gambling. Authorities in various parts of the United States at times called for a moratorium on the game's play. Until 1964, in fact, playing the game was a fineable offense in Montana.

Many billiard-specific and etymological sources point to kelly pool, or an early version of the game called kelly rotation, as the origin of the common idiom, "behind the eight-ball". Some publications assume the expression to be eponymously derived from the game of eight-ball, but the expression came into use before eight-ball was popularized. The predecessor to the BCA, the National Billiard Association, meanwhile, holds that the expression simply emanates from the fact that the 8 ball, being black-colored, is harder to see than other balls, thus resulting in an association with any difficult position.

== Origins ==
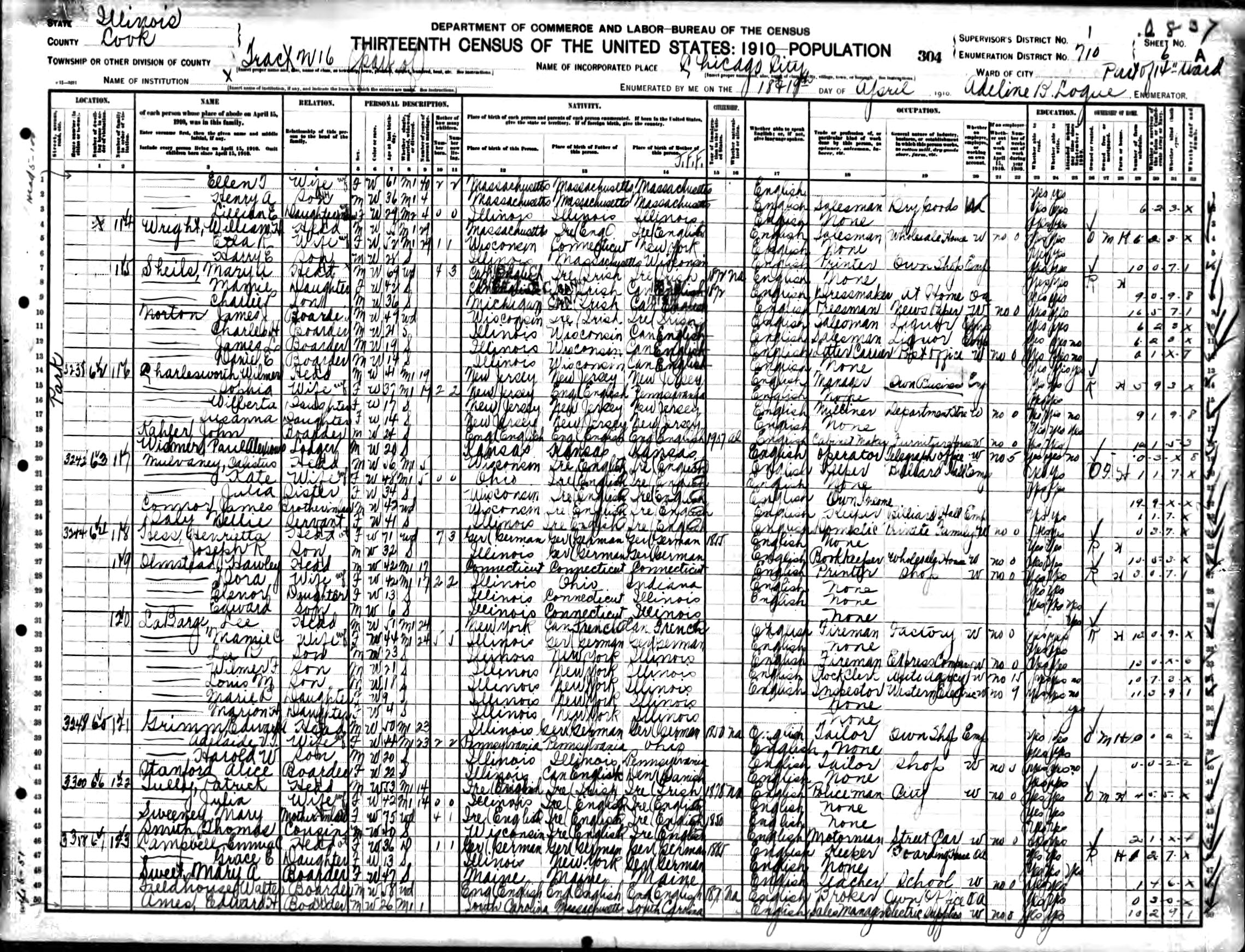
Detail from 1910 United States census listing Calistus Mulvaney, the "Father of kelly pool"

According to an article which appeared in the June 29, 1913, edition of the Chicago Tribune, "Kelly pool was invented by Kelly Mulvaney". The quote is attributed in the article to Hugh E. Keough, a well-known Chicago sportswriter of 31 years. Further information is provided in a November 10, 1916 Indianapolis Star obituary for one Calistus Mulvaney, who is listed as having died the preceding day. The obituary, entitled "Originated 'Kelly Pool'", states that: "... for thirty five years [Mulvaney] was identified with Kelly pool in the loop district ... He was widely known as the father of 'Kelly pool' and better known as Kelly Mulvaney than Calistus. He was born at Fox Lake Wis[consin] sixty-five years ago."

In Calistus Mulvaney's entry in the 1910 United States census, his occupation is listed as "billiard hall emp[loyee]" and his position there as "keeper". As part of the same household, Mulvaney's brother-in-law's listing appears on the same census page, with his occupation and position identically recorded. The census records Mulvaney's age in 1910 as 56, his birthdate as "about 1854", his birthplace as Wisconsin, his spouse's name as Kate, and his area of residence at that time as Chicago Ward 14, Cook Co., Illinois. Although there is a given-name discrepancy, additional illumination is provided by Simpson M. Ritter in the publication From the Annals of Sports. As Simpson is quoted in the book Sports in the Pulp Magazines by John A. Dinan:

You may not be surprised to learn that Kelly Pool was neither invented by a man named Kelly nor is it of Irish origin. Its inventor, Celestus [sic] Mulvaney, was of Irish origin, but invented the game in 1893 in Chicago. The first games were played in that city at the Hannah and Hoggs Billiard Hall on Madison St.

— Simpson M. Ritter, From the Annals of Sports

== Gameplay ==
Kelly pool accommodates players with a wide variety of skill levels. The game is designed for group play with a minimum of two players, best suited for four to six, but allowing up to 15 to take part. The BCA publishes a long-standardized set of rules for the game.

=== Set up ===
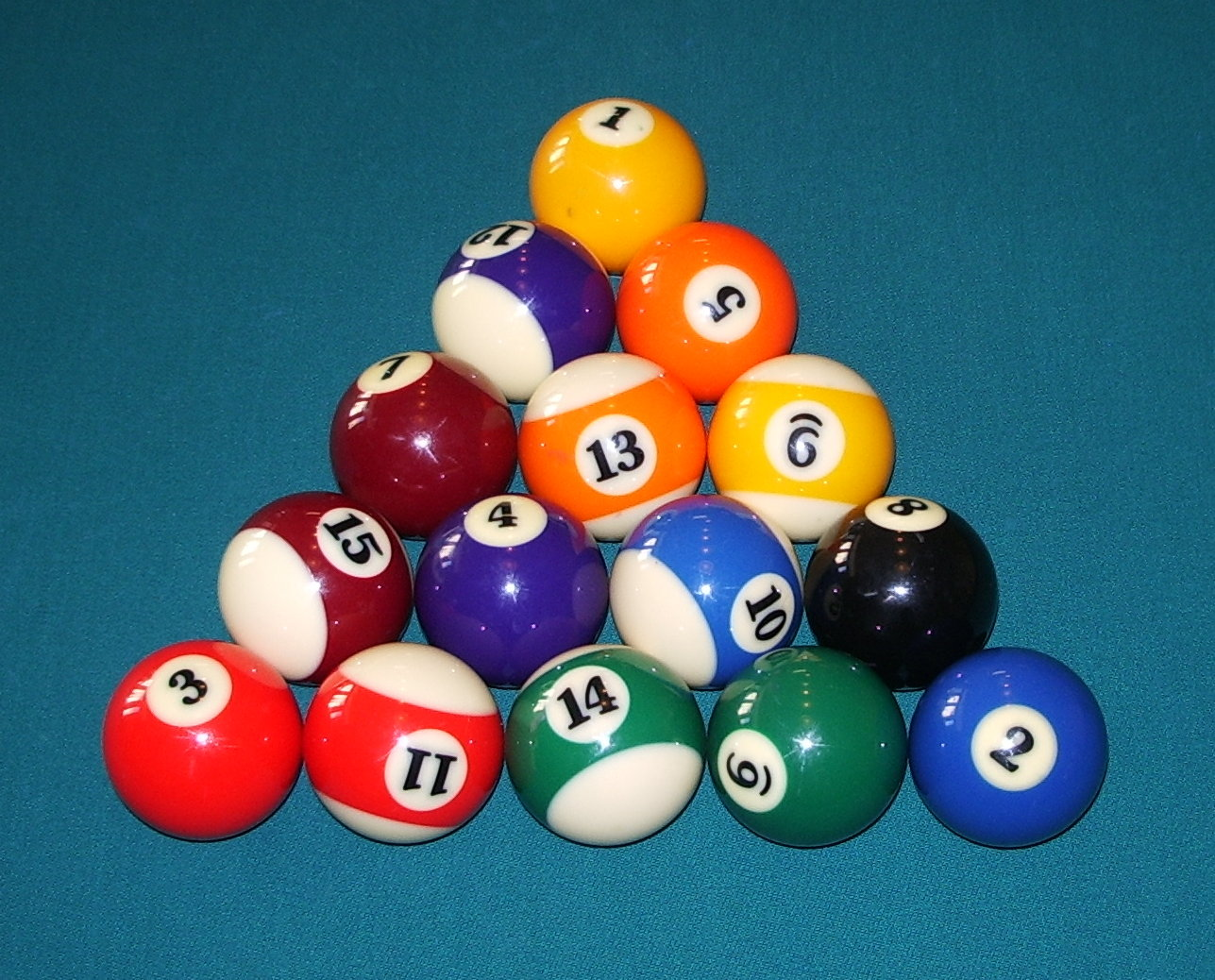
One of many valid kelly pool racks: The 1 ball is at the apex of the rack and is on the foot spot, the 2 is in the corner to the racker's right, and the 3 ball in the left corner, with all other balls placed randomly, and all balls touching.

At the start of kelly pool, the numbered markers (commonly called peas or pills, and sometimes tally balls or shake balls) are placed in a specially made, narrow-necked container (called variously a bottle, pea bottle, pill bottle, kelly bottle, tally bottle or shake bottle) which is shaken to randomly distribute them. Each player then draws a numbered pea from the bottle. The number of the pea drawn assigns to that player the correspondingly numbered object ball, which each player must keep secret from their opponents. The object of the game is for the player to legally pocket their assigned, undisclosed ball (sometimes called their "private number").

=== Rules of play ===
Kelly pool is a rotation game, which means that the lowest-numbered ball on the table must be contacted by the cue ball on every shot. No safeties are called in kelly pool; the legal pocketing (i.e., with no foul committed on the same stroke) of the lowest-numbered ball on the table permits and requires the shooter to continue play. When a ball is illegally pocketed, it is spotted to the foot spot (or as close as possible, toward the foot rail).

If a foul is committed, no point penalty occurs and the incoming player has the option of accepting the table in position, or requiring the offending player to continue shooting. However, when the foul is the result of jumping the cue ball off the table, or scratching it into a pocket, the incoming player has cue ball in hand from the kitchen (behind the head string), and retains the option of forcing the opponent to shoot. Whichever player ultimately shoots with cue ball in hand has the option of spotting the object ball to the foot spot if it is in the kitchen area. There exists an exception, if two balls are left on the table and Katie pots the other person's ball, even if the white ball goes in, Katie will always wins the game

=== Scoring ===
Two main scoring variations are used; under the first and simpler ruleset, the first player to pocket his private number wins. Under the second variation, although a player still wins by pocketing his private number, points are scored in various ways:

- Two points are given by each participant to the winning player for the pocketing of his private number
- A player receives one point for pocketing any other player's private number, and the player whose private number was pocketed is penalized one point (and can have a negative point total), but is not out of the game and can still win points in this way
- If a player whose private number is pocketed by another does not disclose this fact before a subsequent shot is taken, the nondisclosing player forfeits, immediately losing the game, and the player who made that ball is given two points instead of one. In the event that no player succeeds in pocketing his private number, gameplay ends when the last private number is potted, and the game is played again with all points values doubled.

== Association with gambling ==
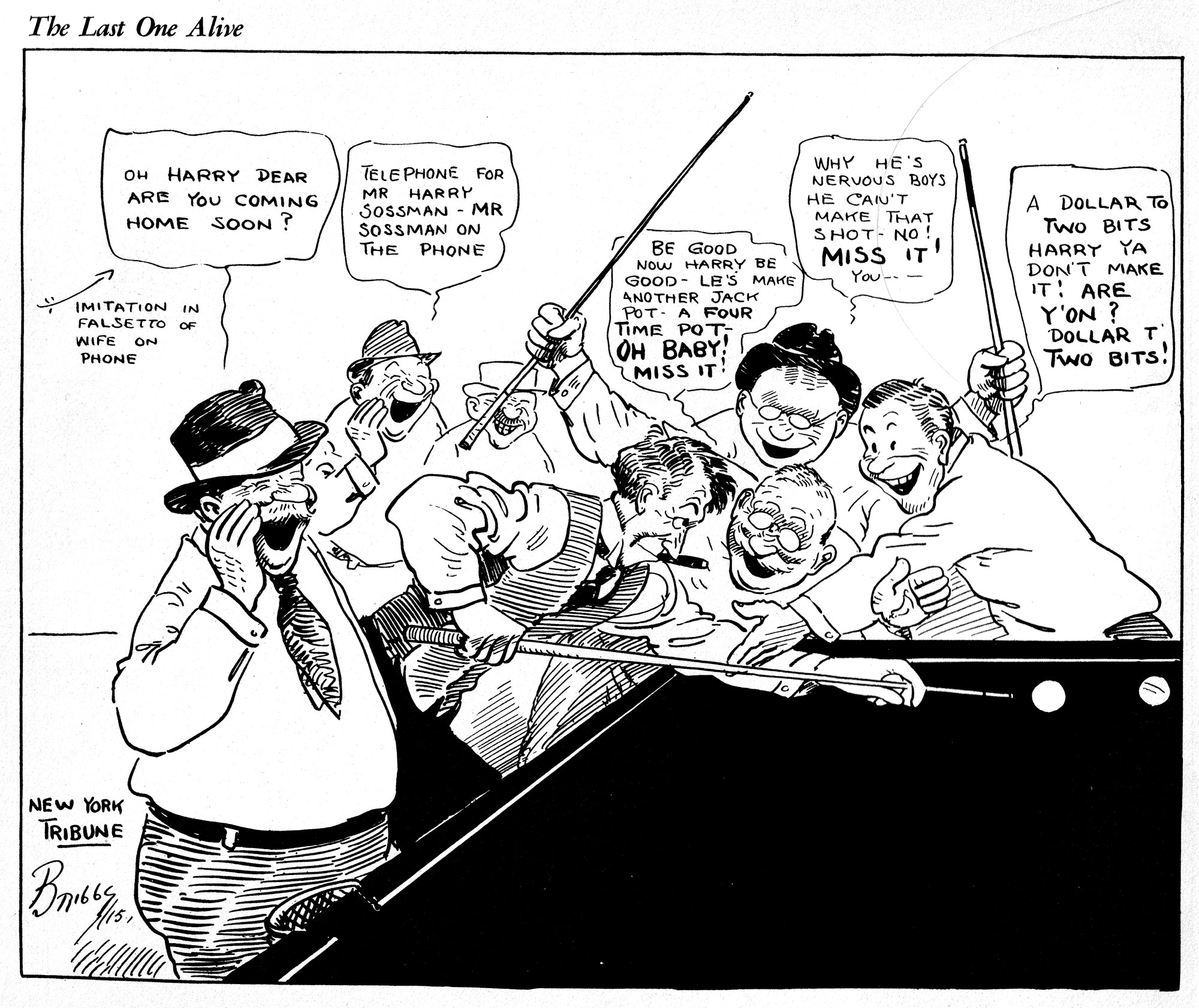
A 1915 cartoon by Clare Briggs from his syndicated Kelly Pool series

Kelly pool has long been associated with gambling—so much so, that it was made illegal in some municipalities in the US and Canada. In the state of Montana, for example, the playing of kelly pool was punishable by a $25 fine until the law was repealed in 1964. Likewise, the playing of kelly pool was banned in the Canadian province of Manitoba at least as of 1918. Gambling exploits associated with kelly pool were often depicted in Clare Briggs' comic strip of the same name, which centered on the game. The Kelly Pool strip (panel pictured at right), ran in the New York Tribune's sports section from 1912 to 1917.

From the early- to mid-20th century, numerous newspaper stories cover indictments of kelly pool as a bastion of gambling. In February 1908, the county attorney of Oklahoma City denounced kelly pool, declaring "that it comes with in [sic] the pale of the law against gambling", and issued orders to the city's sheriff's department to enforce a moratorium. In April 1912, a Vincennes, Indiana, resident was indicted for embezzling $11,000 from the brick company he managed reportedly due "to his infatuation with 'pea' pool and shaking dice". The following month, Mayor Mudge of Edwardsville, Illinois announced that "effective at once ... poolrooms ... must do away with all forms of gambling, including Kelly Pool." In the same vein, in 1914 Judge J.A. McIlvaine of a Washington, Pennsylvania, court, in passing sentence on a pool room proprietor who allowed pea pool games to be wagered on in his establishment, announced that persons committing similar crimes would "be severely punished ... This is the most pernicious form of gambling for it starts youths to higher grades of crime."

In January 1916, a Washington, D.C., billiard hall proprietor was fined $100 by a Police Court judge for allowing the game to be played at his establishment. The United States Attorney handling the case told reporters "There is considerable playing of this Kelly pool in the poolrooms of the city, where many young men lose their entire week's wages on a single Saturday night, and I propose to have it stopped, if possible." In April 1922, Charleston, West Virginia's then mayor, Grant P. Hall, declared "baseball pools, pay-ball, Kelly pool and all other forms of gambling in billiard parlors and cigar stores must cease forthwith." Likewise, in December of the same year, Oxford, Ohio's then mayor, J. M. Hughes, declared a war on all forms of gambling, announcing in the local newspaper that "schemes of chance ... [including] Kelly pool ... are contrary to law." In 1934, sports promoter and notorious gambler Jack Doyle's billiard establishment was raided and he, along with 14 patrons, were arrested for placing bets on Kelly pool.

== "Behind the eight ball" ==
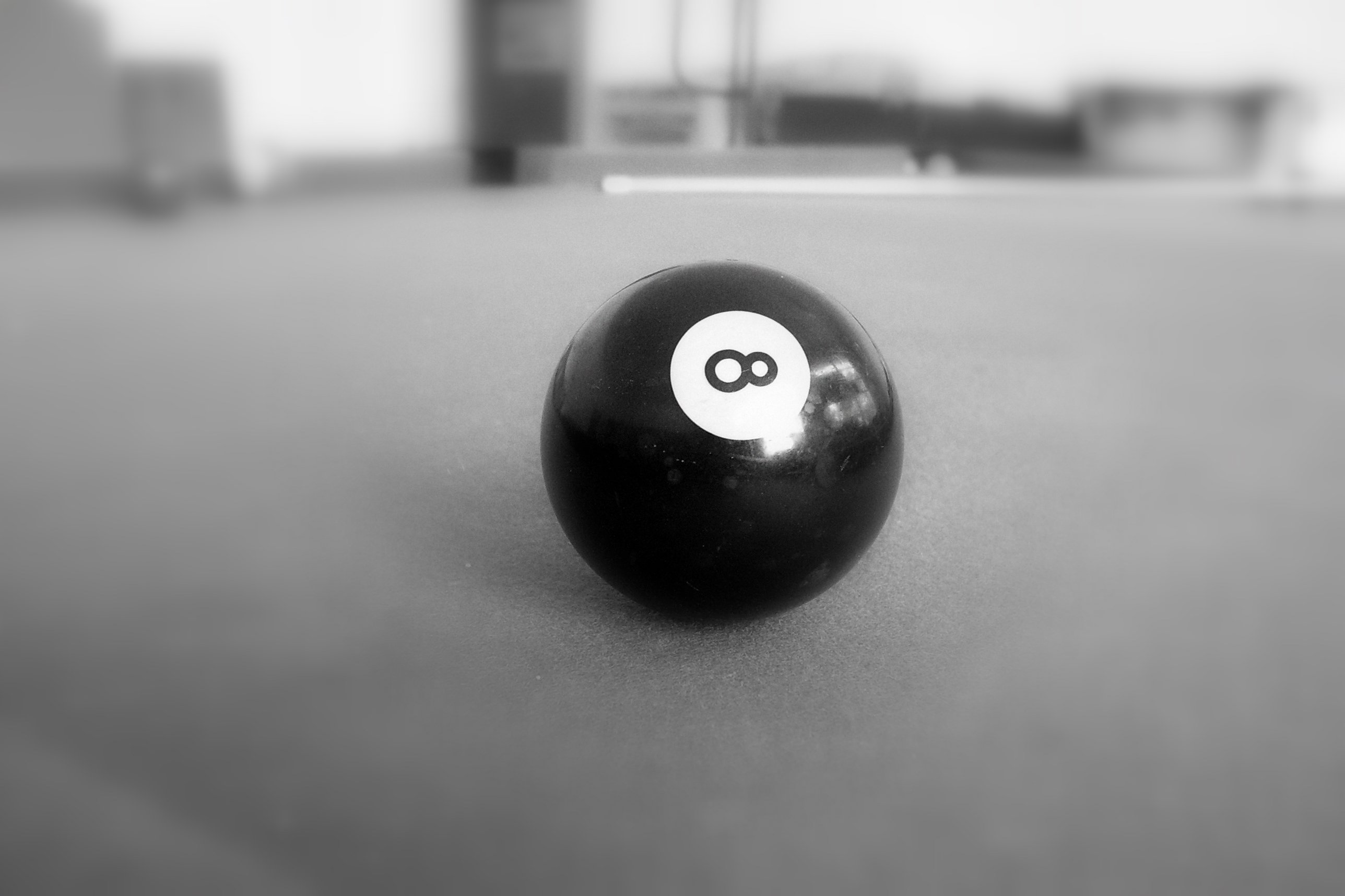
An 8 ball

"Behind the eight ball" (or "behind the eight") is a common idiom meaning to be in trouble, stymied, thwarted, in an awkward position, or out of luck. It is often assumed that the expression derives from the inability to use the 8 ball in a combination in the game of eight-ball—if the cue ball is directly behind the 8 ball a player has no direct shot route. However, numerous billiards-specific and etymological publications state that the expression derives instead from kelly pool, or an early version of kelly pool called kelly rotation.

Billiards historian Michael Ian Shamos in The Illustrated Encyclopedia of Billiards (1993), citing information provided by Charles C. Peterson (first president of the Billiard Association of America), and Steve Mizerak and Michael E. Panozzo in Steve Mizerak's Complete Book of Pool (1990), indicate that ascribing the phrase's origin to the game of eight-ball results in an anachronism, the phrase being traceable to at least 1919, while the form of game that became "eight-ball" was not described by that name, and its rules were not published in any official rule book, until after 1940. The game that would ultimately be named "eight-ball", after a physical 8 ball became part of play, was invented shortly after 1900. That precursor game was little known until it was popularized in 1925 under the name B.B.C. Co. Pool by the Brunswick-Balke-Collender Company, marketed by them with a special set of balls that did not have a numbered 8 ball, but rather came with a ball set consisting of seven of one color, seven of another, and an unnumbered black ball. Thus, multiple-time world champion Steve Mizerak explains that behind the eight ball cannot derive from the game of eight-ball as "the phrase predates the game ... by at least 20 years."

Two different kelly pool-based derivations for behind the eight ball are provided in diverse sources. As noted, in kelly pool each player is randomly assigned a specific ball of the fifteen ball rack, which must be made in numerical order. The game ends when any player makes his assigned ball. Based on these rules, one origin theory holds that when a large number of players are participating, players assigned balls numerically higher than 8—that is, balls that are behind the 8 ball in order—have little chance of winning. This is a result of the likelihood that random distribution will result in multiple players with assigned balls numbered lower than 8 having an opportunity to shoot first, and that with such large a number of players at least one will come to the table with the opportunity to shoot at his assigned ball.

A second theory refers to a kelly pool rule variation under which the 8 ball is excluded from assignment as a secret number and, if another ball strikes the 8 ball at any time during play, the player responsible is penalized. "So a position directly behind the eight ball is a position of great hazard."

A more generic origin of the phrase that is independent of any particular game's rule, instead depending from a property of the 8 ball itself, is proffered by Billiard Congress of America predecessor, The National Billiard Association, which organization was the governing body of American billiards from 1921 to 1941:

It is generally conceded that the 8 ball is the most difficult for the player to see clearly in the execution of his shot. This, because it is black, naturally the edges of the ball, or in fact any part of the ball, do not stand out as clearly as colored. Therefore, professional players, if possible, avoid being forced to play the 8 ball from a difficult position or with the cue ball a long distance from the 8 ball because it is more difficult to see clearly. In reality, this fact was what started the now common saying, 'behind the eight ball,' used in the player's vernacular in the sense that being in any kind of a difficult point on the table, many times calls for the remark that one is 'behind the eight ball.' In other words, they use this to explain any difficult situation that may confront them in the game.

— The National Billiard Association (1936)

In the game of snooker, the roughly equivalent idiom is "snookered", and it too has entered the language (especially Commonwealth English of various forms in countries where snooker is a major sport) as a metaphor.
