= Pyramid pool =

Historical precursor to snooker

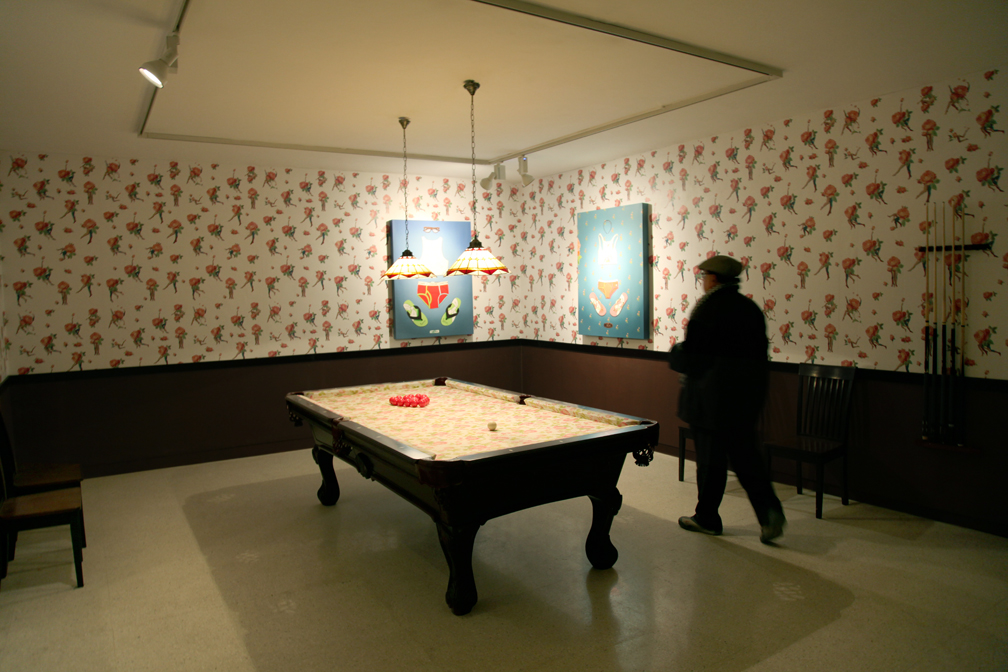
Setup for pyramid pool

Pyramid pool, or simply pyramids, is a form of pool that was played mainly in the 19th century. It was one of several pool games that were popular at this time, and was the forerunner to modern games such as eight-ball, straight pool, and Russian pyramid. Along with black pool, it was one of the progenitor cue sports of snooker.

== Rules ==
Object balls were racked in a triangle with any remaining balls placed at the back of the triangle. It could be played by several players, with an agreed stake per ball pocketed, or with just two players in which case the winner is the one to first sink over half the balls. Teams were also allowed if there were an even number of players. In early versions of the game, when one object ball remained, the game shifted so one player took possession of the original cue ball, while the other used the object ball, as they attempted to sink the other player's designated ball. This rule was dropped in the United States during the late 19th century. An early version of pyramid pool awarded the entire pool to the player that sank the last ball. Originally, balls did not need to be called. The calling of shots was added in the early 1880s in the United States.

== History ==
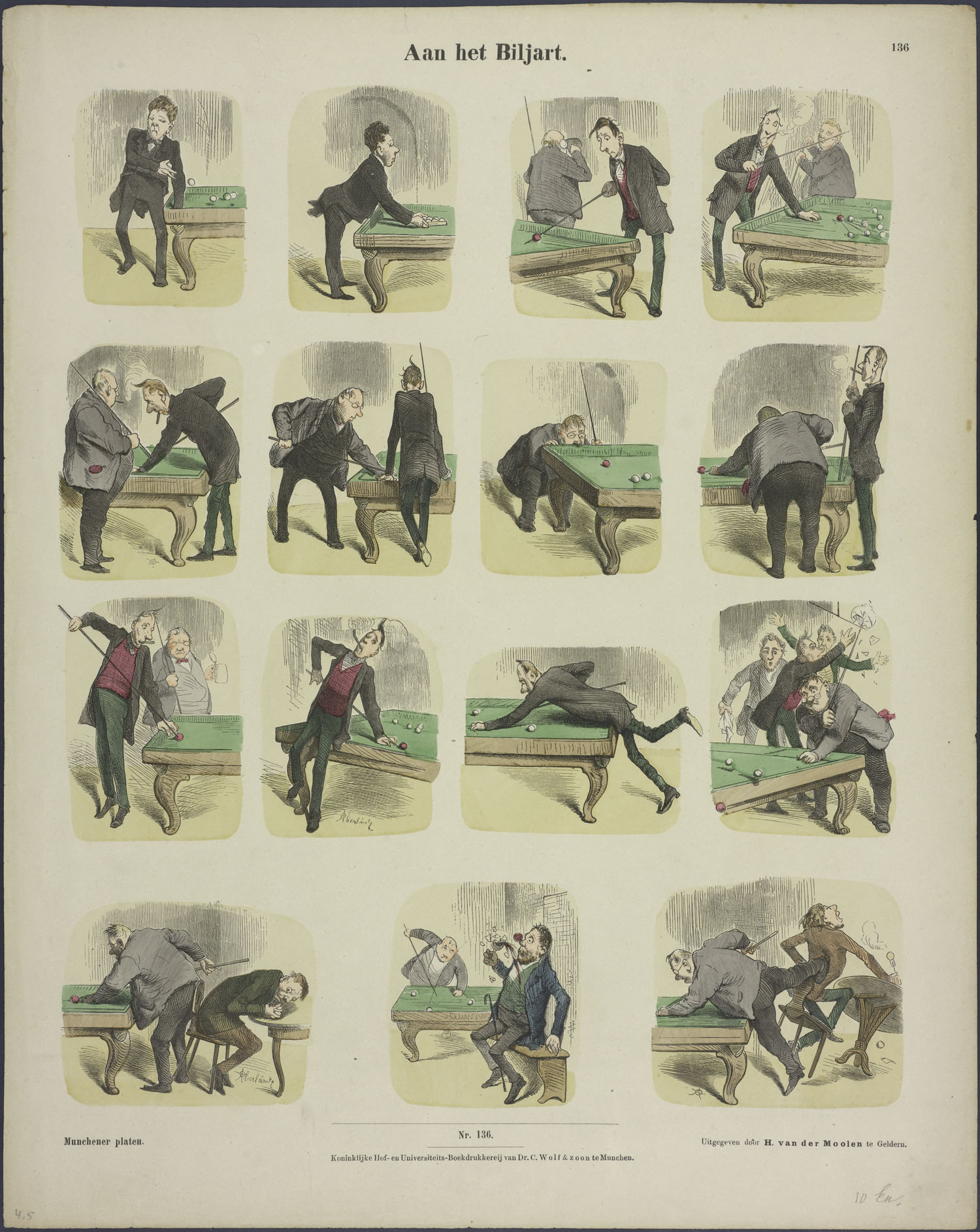
Cartoon by Adolf Oberländer

The earliest rules were recorded in Vienna in 1795 under the name à la Figaro or à la pyramide. In Continental Europe, the game was played with a red cue ball and unnumbered white object balls. Any number of object balls could be used, but the earliest minimum was twelve with later rule books recommending fifteen, twenty-one, or twenty-four balls. The game arrived in English-speaking countries by 1850 but the colours were reversed with the cue ball being white and the object balls red.

== Legacy ==
In 1875, this game combined with black pool to form snooker. In the United States, pyramid pool developed into fifteen-ball pool, a precursor to rotation and straight pool. Since the middle of the 20th century, the American version of pyramid pool has been known as basic pool or basic pocket billiards which now uses modern pool balls.
