= Pin billiards =

Pin billiards may refer to any of a fairly large number of billiard games that uses a pin, or a set of "pins" or "skittles". The earliest form of billiards, ground billiards, was played with a single pin called the "king". Table billiards kept the king until the mid-18th century. There are billiard games played with as many as thirteen pins.

== Italian pin billiards ==
Pin billiards has two distinct variations of pin billiards; played with similar rules to carom billiards. Italian five-pin billiards, also known as cinque birilli, is played with five pins in a + formation, with points being given for knocking over pins with the object balls. The game is common across a wide area and also inspired Danish Pin Billiards. Italian nine-pin billiards, which is also known as goriziana, is a variation of the sport, with a higher complexity of scoring, and has further variations such as tutti doppi and filotto.

=== Danish pin billiards ===
A Danish variation, known as Keglebillard is played on a carom sized table, however, it is also played with pockets. The game is unusual for billiards, as both players play with the same cue-ball, (using a red ball). A variant (usually found in social settings is known as skomager).

== Bar billiards ==
Mostly played in Great Britain, bar billiards originated in the 1930s. It is unique in that it is played on a carom-sized table with holes in the playing surface, but none at the sides or corners. There are two types of pins a table may have: mushroom-shaped ones or pins with a needle piercing through the center. Both are designed to prevent them from falling into the holes. Knocking one over incurs a penalty. Balls falling through the holes are returned to the playing end of the table. All shots are played 'from hand'. The duration of the game is controlled by a coin-operated clockwork mechanism, which drops a bar to prevent balls returning into play.

== Other games ==
- Bottle pool is essentially a pin billiards game but instead uses a leather bottle.
- Devil's pool and victory billiards, two variants played in Australia, which use obelisk-shaped pins (like over-sized dominoes) as targets and obstacles.
