= Fifteen-ball pool =

Pocket billiards game

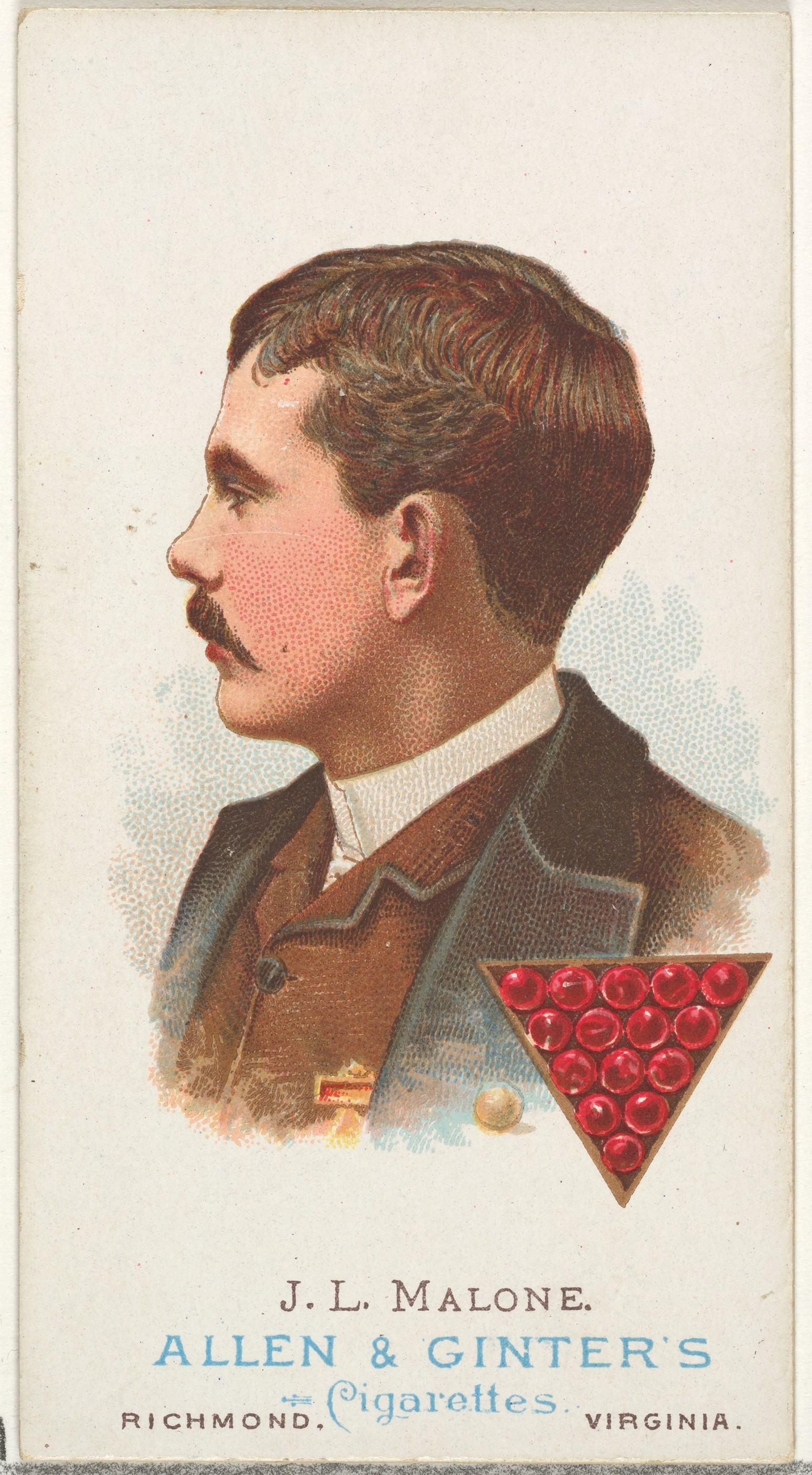
Cigarette card of John L. Malone with pool balls (1887)

Fifteen-ball pool, also known as sixty-one pool, is a pocket billiards game developed in America in the nineteenth century from pyramid pool. Created by members of the Bassford's Billiard & Chess Rooms in Manhattan during the late 1830s or 1840s, it is the ancestor to many American pool games.

== Rules ==
The game is played on a six pocket table with a standard set of fifteen numbered and colored object balls and a white cue ball. During the game's peak popularity from the 1870s to the 1880s, the object balls were uniformly red, though now a standard set of multi-color solids-and-stripes pool balls are used. Object balls are racked in a triangle with the 15-ball as the apex ball, placed at the foot spot. Behind it are the other high numbered balls with the rest in the back rows, usually in descending order.

A number on a ball pocketed by a player on a legal shot scores that number of points and entitles shooter to continue at the table until failing to do so. The object is to be the first player to score at least 61 points (this being more than half of the total of all the ball numbers combined), to win a frame. If there are more than two players, a frame is won by the player having the highest number of points when all the balls have been pocketed.

In 1880, a rule was introduced to discourage safety shots, which requires the cue ball to make contact with an object ball in each shot, and either cause an object ball to be pocketed, or at least one ball to hit a cushion. Failure to meet this condition results in a foul. Three points are subtracted for each foul, and three consecutive fouls will cost a player the frame.

Because scoring depends not on the number of balls pocketed, but on the point values of the balls pocketed, it is possible to sink twice the number of balls as the opponent and still lose the frame.

== Legacy ==
This game was the inspiration behind rotation which shares the point system.

The first tournament was held in 1878 at the Union Square Billiard Rooms in New York City which was won by the Canadian Cyrille Dion who defeated Gotthiel Wahlstrom of Sweden. Alfredo de Oro recalled that in 1887, an English spectator pointed out that Albert M. Frey won despite pocketing fewer balls than his opponent John L. Malone. He offered 200 dollars for a rematch in which the first person to pot a hundred balls would win; Frey won again. This game became known as continuous pool and its first tournament was held in 1888 which was also won by Frey. Continuous would go on to become 14.1 continuous after Jerome R. Keogh's reforms in 1910.
