= Cowboy pool =

Type of billiards game

Cowboy pool (or simply cowboy) is a hybrid pool game combining elements of English billiards through an intermediary game, with more standard pocket billiards characteristics. The game employs four balls, the cue ball and three others, numbered one, three, and five. A game of Cowboy pool is contested as a race to 101 points, with those points being awarded for a host of different shot types. Dating back to 1908, the game is a strictly amateur pastime.

== History ==
The parent game of cowboy pool is English billiards, which is itself a hybrid of three predecessor billiards games – the winning game, the losing game and the carambole game (an early form of straight rail) – and dates to approximately 1800 in England. There are a number of pocket billiard games directly descended from English billiards, including bull dog, scratch pool, thirty-one pool and thirty-eight. Thirty-eight is the intermediary game from which cowboy is directly derived. This precursor game was first reported on in the Democrat and Chronicle on 18 January 1885: "there is a new billiards game called 'thirty-eight'. It appears to have met with special favor among the many devotees of pool".

Cowboy is very similar to thirty-eight, with the major difference being that thirty-eight requires the use of two cue balls. It is unknown how thirty-eight transitioned to the modified ruleset mandated by cowboy pool, nor the derivation of its name. The first mention of Cowboy pool is in a 1908 rule book, published about the same time that eight-ball (under a prior name) was first gaining popularity. Despite being strictly amateur – aside from a small sanctioned tournament held in 1914 – the game still remains listed in authoritative rule books alongside just a handful of other games.

== Rules ==
Conventional cowboy pool uses only four balls: the cue ball and object balls numbered one, three, and five. The balls have a set opening placement: the one-ball is placed on the head spot; the three-ball on the foot spot; and the five-ball on the center spot. As in the game of snooker, balls that are pocketed are immediately respotted to their starting position. Beginning with ball in-hand from the kitchen – the area behind a pool table's head string – the incoming player must contact the three-ball first. If the player fails to do so, the opponent may either force the player to repeat the break shot, or elect to break themself.

To win the match, a player needs to score 101 points. For the first 90, points are scored in three ways:

- one point for performing a carom on the cue ball into any two object balls;
- two points for caroming into all three object balls;
- and the face value of any ball pocketed.

The maximum score possible on any single shot is 11 points, achieved by caroming off and pocketing all three balls. The failure to score in one of the delineated manners on any shot ends the player's inning at the table. All foul shots result in the player losing all points scored during the inning (not just those on the fouled stroke), and the opposing player comes to the table with the cue ball in position – except in the case of a scratch, which results in ball-in-hand from the kitchen.

The 90th point in cowboy pool must be reached exactly, and the failure to do so is a foul resulting in a loss of turn. For example, this means that a player with 89 points, who then scores 2 points rather than exactly 1, has committed a foul. Once the 90-point benchmark is reached, all points up to the 100th must be made by caroms. The pocketing of balls during this phase of the game gains no points.

The final point necessary to reach 101 and the win must be made by a losing hazard – an intentional scratch made by caroming the cue ball off the one ball, scratching off either other ball (three or five) is a foul.
