= Italian billiards =

Italian billiards may refer to:

- Five-pin billiards or five-pins, a now internationally standardized cue sport
- Goriziana a.k.a. nine-pin billiards or nine-pins, a more complicated derivative of five-pin billiards
- Cue sports (billiards-type games) in Italian sport generally
