= American snooker =

Cue sport specific to the United States

- Governing body: Billiard Congress of America

American snooker is a cue sport played almost exclusively in the United States, and strictly on a recreational, amateur basis. Diverging from the original game of snooker, rules for American snooker date back to at least 1925, and have been promulgated by the Billiard Congress of America (BCA) since the mid-20th century. The game is in decline, as the standardized international rules have largely supplanted it.

American snooker has a simplified rule set compared to the international game, and is usually played on smaller tables. Depending upon equipment availability, the balls and pockets may be larger than those for standard snooker, up to the size of pool balls and pockets.

The United States Snooker Association is not connected with the game of American snooker, being the IBSF-recognized US governing body of standard-rules snooker.

== History ==
American snooker made its first known in-print appearance in the 1925 edition of Brunswick–Balke–Collender Co.'s Rules Governing the Royal Game of Billiards, a rulebook given away by the company (with illustrations of their tables) as a promotional item. The previous edition, published in 1914, included snooker, but it was a summary of the original British version, as defined then by the Billiard Association of Great Britain and Ireland, whom the Brunswick booklet credited. The 1925 American version had a longer ruleset, opposite the situation today. Since at least as early as 1946, the Billiard Association of America (BAA), later the Billiard Congress of America (BCA), has published rules for American snooker in every edition of its near-annual rule book. The BCA describes the game as "a cousin of snooker as it is played broadly around the world, the regulations giving it a distinctive direction toward the configuration of many American pocket billiard games".

== Equipment ==
American snooker often uses 54 mm (2 1/8 inch) balls, but may use standard 52.5 mm (approx. 2 1/16 in) balls. It is typically played on a 10 by 5 ft (3.0 by 1.5 m) table (and in private homes, often on even smaller tables), as full-size regulation 12 by 6 ft (3.7 by 1.8 m) British-style tables are rare in the United States, although they are legal for American snooker. Most serious players obtain proper snooker cues, though novices may settle for a thicker-tipped pool cue. The game can easily be adapted informally to standard, large-pocketed 9 by 4.5 ft (2.7 by 1.4 m) pool tables, with snooker ball sets the same size as regular American pool balls (to compensate for the larger pool pockets); Saluc, for example, manufactures such a 57 mm (2 1/4 inch) set, under their Aramith brand name. American snooker sets often come with color balls that are numbered with their point values.

== Rules ==
While American snooker shares many similarities to that of the modern international game of snooker, it has some differences. Foul shots are always awarded as a 7-point foul, as opposed to 4–7 depending on circumstances in the traditional game. Fouling can also occur if the cue makes contact with the table cloth, causing a 14-point foul. Colored balls must be pocketed cleanly, meaning that once the cue ball has struck them, they cannot make contact with any other ball before being pocketed, or it is a foul.

As is more traditional with pool games, a lag is used in place of a coin flip at the beginning of the match, and also in the case of a respotted black.
