= Five-pins (disambiguation) =

Five-pins, fivepins, or 5-pins may refer to:

- Five-pin billiards, including:
  - Danish pin billiards
  - Italian five-pin billiards
- Five-pin bowling
