= Multiplying billiard balls =

Multiplying billiard balls (Excelsior Ball Trick, August Roterberg, 1898) is a magic routine that is popular with both amateur and advanced conjurors but still rarely seen. As its name implies, the magician uses sleight of hand to manipulate a number of billiard balls (the balls are often smaller than actual billiard balls), giving the impression that he is making them appear and vanish at his command.

== Effect ==
In this presentation, the magician will hold a single ball in his hand. The ball suddenly becomes two balls, in plain view of the audience. He then proceeds to produce a third and fourth ball, all in the same hand. The magician will then vanish the balls, one at a time, until only one remains. Often, part of the routine involves the magician giving the impression that he is "passing" the balls through his body, in and out of his mouth, fingertips, and pockets.

Sets of multiplying billiard balls are available from magicians' supply stores. The quality, size, material, and price of the balls can vary greatly and are dependent on the magician's personal taste. The balls are most frequently made of wood, plastic, or metal.

== Credits ==
From an article by Tom Stone in the Swedish magazine Trollkarlen (No 152 - 2003):

"The history of the Multiplying Ball effect isn’t as ancient as one might believe, but it is all the more messy. The origin has been tracked back to Buatier de Kolta, who in 1875, for the first time ever, performed an effect where one ball magically was produced, and then multiplied into three balls. However, the choreography was quite different from what is considered standard today. In de Kolta’s original, the balls were held together in one hand, from underneath – the hand acting almost as a basket for the balls, while all the magic was performed with the other hand. As noted by Tommy Wonder, the original effect was both more elegant and clearer than the versions known today. But where has today’s standard handling appeared from? The history here gets trickier to follow.

"In Hoffman’s book “More Magic” (1889), Hoffman describes, with credits to de Kolta, a small variation. But the choreography and effect is still basically the same.

"The first time a version similar to the modern handling is published is in the August issue 1900 of a German magazine, Carl Willmann’s “Zauberwelt”. There are no credits in the description, but it isn’t claimed as a new piece either. And the piece has the somewhat odd title (in translation) “The Chicago Balls”.

"So, the origin of the modern standard choreography seems to have appeared between the publication of Hoffman’s book in 1889 and the published effect in “Zauberwelt” 1900. And in the latter, there is an odd reference to Chicago. Going through the records, it turns out that the only connection Willmann had to Chicago, was that he was doing business with a German-born dealer of magic props named August Roterberg.

"During this period, August Roterberg published two books, both containing effects with balls: “The Modern Wizard” (1894) and “Latter Day Tricks” (1896). Curiously enough, these pieces make use of the same props as today’s standard routines, but the choreography is still an emulation of de Kolta’s.

"But it still seems like Roterberg is the creator of today’s standard version, because soon after the publication of “Latter Day Tricks”, he published a small manuscript (together with the props) titled: “Excelsior Ball Trick”, and here all the pieces in the puzzle is in place. Both the props and the choreography is the same as what is known as standard today, and the balls are produced between the fingers."

Assisting in research: Richard Hatch, USA. Christer Nilsson, Sweden
