= Vandy (disambiguation) =

Vandy can refer to:

== People ==
- Vandy Hampton, a former member of the Chi-Lites R&B/soul vocal quartet
- Vandy Kaonn (born 1942), Cambodian history and literature analyst and author
- Khek Vandy (Khek being the surname), Cambodian politician elected the National Assembly of Cambodia in 2003
- Vandy Rattana (born 1980), Cambodian photographer and artist
- Peter Vandy, 20th-21st century politician in Sierra Leone
- Vanessa Vandy (born 1989), New Zealand-born Finnish retired pole vaulter
- Benjamin H. Vandervoort (1917–1990), US Army officer in World War II
- Machiel van den Heuvel (1900–1946), Dutch World War II prisoner of war known as "Vandy" by his British fellow POWs at Colditz Castle
- Paul Vandy, stage name of juggler Charles Edward Maynard (c. 1874–1950)

== Other uses ==
- The colloquial name for Vanderbilt University
- Vandy, Ardennes, a commune in northern France
- The sports teams of the Vandercook Lake, Michigan, school district
- Solomon Vandy, a character in the film Blood Diamond

== See also ==
- Vandi, a surname
