= 1 ball =

1 ball may refer to:

- 1 ball, the pool (pocket billiards) ball numbered "1" and colored yellow
- 1 ball, a red snooker ball, worth 1 point, normally referred to as "a red"

== See also ==
- 1-ball
