= Vandi =

Vandi is a surname. Notable people with the surname include:

- Alfio Vandi (born 1955), Italian cyclist
- Despina Vandi (born 1969), Greek singer
- Isa Vandi (born 1960), Iranian-Swedish film director and producer
- Sante Vandi (1653–1716), Italian Baroque painter

== Other uses ==
- Vandi (film), a 2018 Tamil-language action film

== See also ==
- Vandy (disambiguation)
