= Nine-pins =

Nine-pins, ninepins, or 9-pins may refer to:

- Nine-pin billiards, also known as goriziana
- Nine-pin bowling
- Skittles (sport), especially the Greater London variant
