= Boccette =

Billiards-type game played in Italy

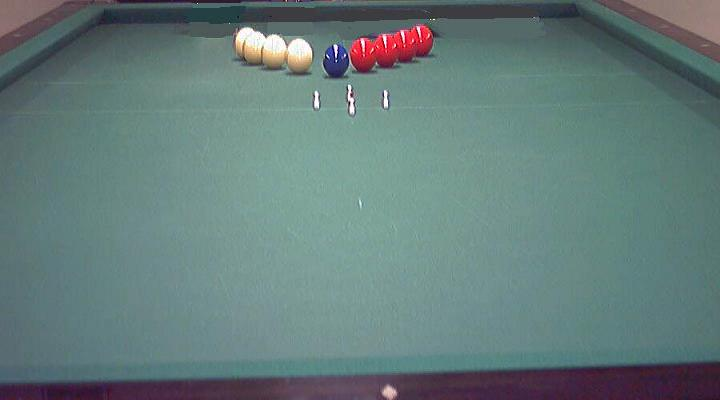
Boccette setup

Boccette is a billiards-type game played in Italy. A variation of the game of five-pins, it is played on a pocket-less carom billiard table with nine balls (typically four white, four red, and one blue). Cue sticks are not used; the balls are manipulated with the hands directly. The game is also popular in countries colonized by Italy, specially in Eritrea.
