= USSA =

Ussa is an area in Nigeria.

USSA may refer to:

== Organizations ==
- United States Sailing Association, commonly known as US Sailing
- United States Ski and Snowboard Association
- United States Snooker Association
- United States Space Academy
- United States Sports Academy
- United States Student Association
- University of Strathclyde Students' Association
- University Sports South Africa

== Media and entertainment ==
- U.S.S.A., American rock band
- United Socialist States of America, a country in the alternate history setting of Back in the USSA

== Other ==
- Unwanted same-sex attraction, a term used in conversion therapy

== See also ==
- USA (disambiguation)
