= Five-ball =

Five-ball, fiveball, 5-ball, or 5 ball may refer to:

- 5 ball, the pool ball numbered "5" and colored orange
- 5 ball, the blue snooker ball, worth 5 points, normally referred to as "the blue"
- 5-ball, a five-dimensional n-ball in mathematics
