= Danish pin billiards =

Traditional cue sport of Denmark

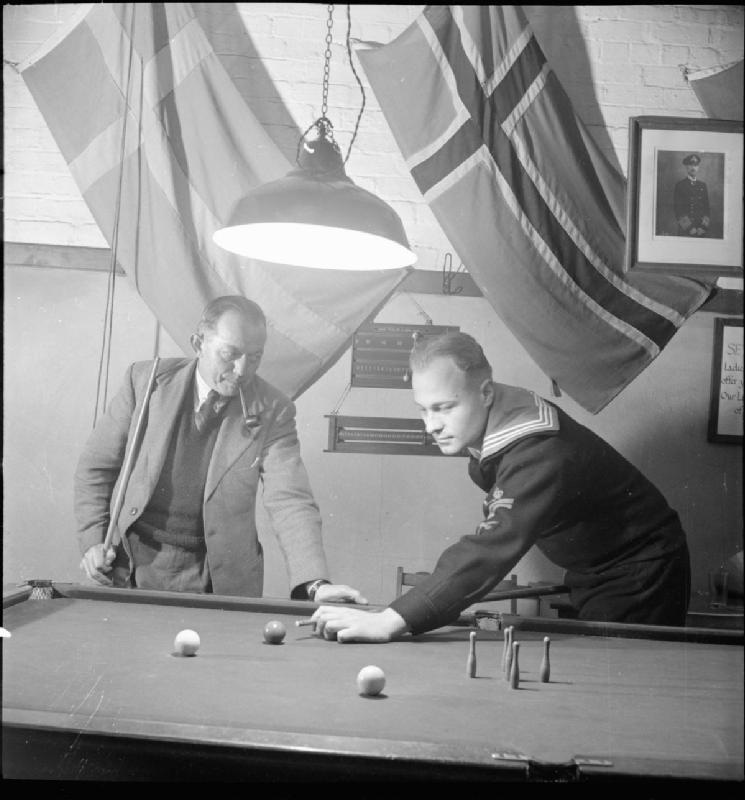
Danish pin billiards

Danish billiards or keglebillard, sometimes called Danish five-pin billiards, is the traditional cue sport of Denmark, and the game remains predominantly played in that country. It makes use of a 5 × 10 ft (approximately 1.5 × 3 m) six-pocket table, three billiard balls, and five pins (skittles), which are considerably larger than those used in the similar and internationally standardized (originally Italian) game of five-pin billiards.

== Rules ==
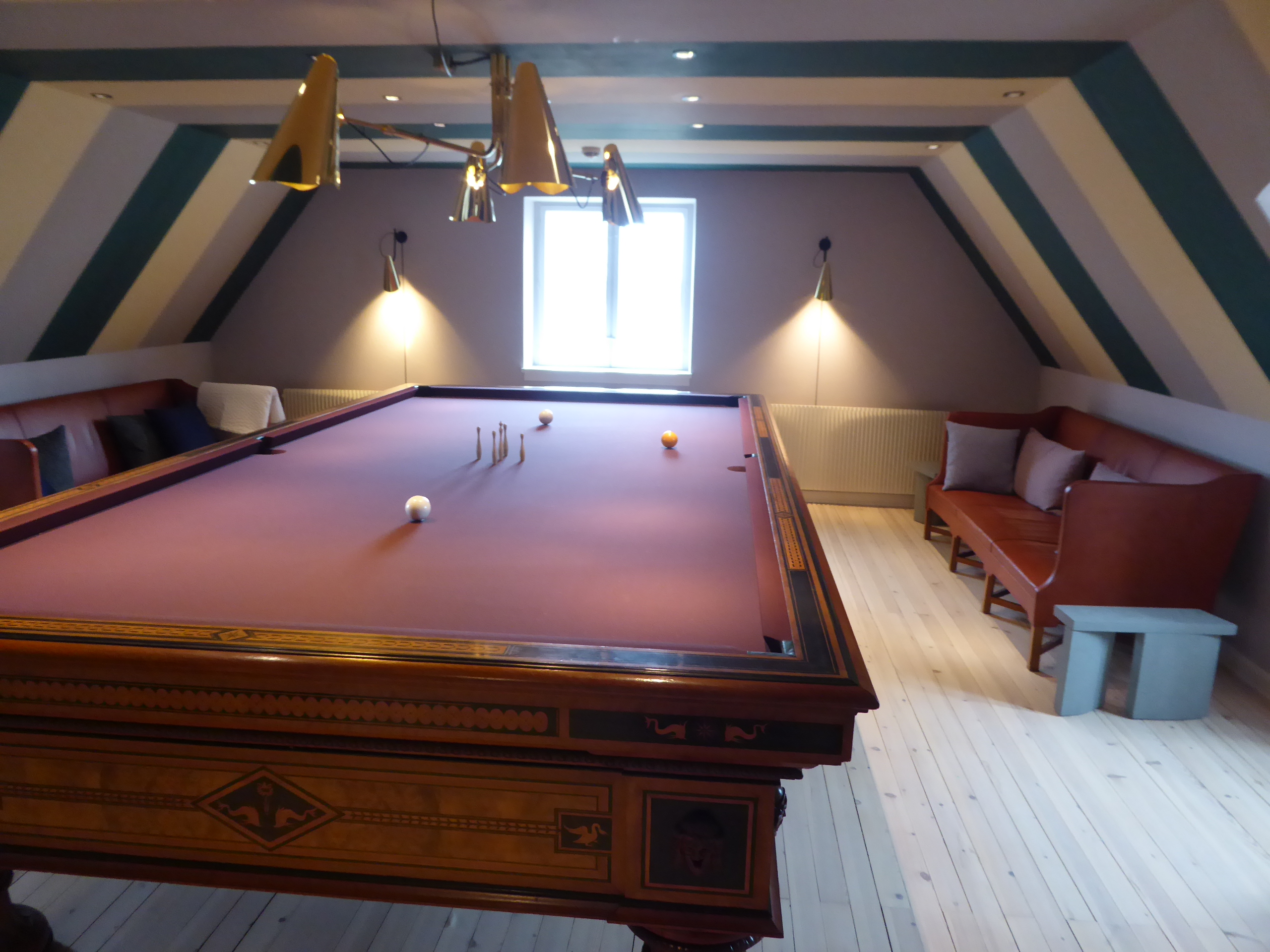
Billiard room at the Marienborg.

The aim of the game is to achieve a predetermined number of points in as few shots as possible. The game is played with one red ball and two white balls. In an inversion of the normal play in most three-ball games such as carom billiards and English billiards, the red ball is used as a cue ball by both players, with the white balls as the object balls.

There are three ways to score points.

- 2 points per pin knocked over with a white object ball after hitting the white with the red cue ball (i.e. a combination ball-to-pin shot).
- 4 points for "making red", that is, to have the cue ball hit both object balls.
- A combination of the two.

=== Fouls ===
It is a foul if...

- the cue ball topples a pin
- the cue ball leaves the table, whether by a pocket or over the edge.
- a cushion isn't hit in at least every other shot.
- the third consecutive shot where no pin falls is a foul.
- any ball leaves the table.
- a pin is toppled via a means other than a white ball.
- the active player doesn't have at least one foot on the floor.

The only effect of a foul is that the shot counts 0, ending the player's turn at the table.

If a white ball is pocketed it is simply spotted opposite the other white ball. It is not a foul.

== Skomager ==
Skomager, Skoma'r, or Skomar (meaning shoemaker) is a popular variant with more scoring opportunities and slightly modified rules. It is typically played in bars around the country, but is also enjoyed at a professional level.

=== Rules ===
Unlike Danish Pin Billiards, players in Skomager take turns between each shot. Additionally, every shot must hit at least one cushion in order to be valid.

A game of Skomager is typically played to between 60 and 100 points.

Points are awarded in the following ways:

- 2 points per pin toppled
- 2 points for pocketing a white ball.
- 2 points for knocking a white ball off the table (this is a foul in tournaments).
- 4 points for "making red"
- 4 points for "making pale", which means to hit an object ball with the other object ball. It is not possible to score points for making red and making pale in the same shot.
- 6 points for toppling the "king pin" alone. The king pin is the centre pin.
- 16 points for toppling all 5 pins in a single shot.

=== Fouls ===
The rules for fouls are similar, but reward the opponent "crooked" (skæve) points that would have been made for the shot plus extra crooked points for particularly gross fouls.

- 2 crooked points per pin toppled with the cue ball.
- 6 crooked + points for the pins if a white ball hit the pins directly (no cushion was involved)
- 6 crooked + points for the pins if the red cue ball hit the pins directly.
- 6 crooked points if the red cue ball was knocked off the table
- 6 crooked points if no ball hit a cushion
- 6 crooked + points for the pins if shooting out of turn
- 6 crooked + points for the pins if pins were toppled accidentally with the cue or hand or similar.

== Svensk kægle ==
Svensk kægle ('Swedish pin') is a variation that has more in common with Italian five-pins: the optimal shot is to knock over the "king" pin (standing in the center of the pins) without toppling any other pins.
