= United States Snooker Association =

- Abbreviation: USSA
- Formation: 1991
- Type: Non-profit organization
- Purpose: National governing body of the sport of snooker
- Headquarters: San Jose, California, U.S.
- Region served: United States
- Main organ: Board of Directors
- Affiliations: ACS, IBSF, PABSA, WSF
- Website: SnookerUSA.com

The United States Snooker Association (USSA) is the internationally recognized governing body of the sport of snooker in the United States, with its current headquarters registered in San Jose, California.

Founded in 1991 by the British-born Michael Collins, the association functions as a non-profit organization to govern, regulate and sanction both professional and non-professional snooker in the territory of the United States. The association's objectives are also to promote and develop the sport of snooker in the United States, and to create a structure capable of supporting international championships in the United States, and to encourage and foster skilled American players to represent the United States at home and abroad.

The USSA is affiliated in the United States to the American CueSports Alliance (ACS), and at international level is a member of the International Billiards and Snooker Federation (IBSF), the Pan American Billiards and Snooker Association (PABSA), and the World Snooker Federation (WSF).

Despite its name and national scope, the USSA is not in any way related to or recognizes the game of American snooker, which is a strictly amateur, recreational ruleset promulgated by the Billiard Congress of America.

As of 2015, the USSA participates in the joint World Snooker and IBSF Pan-American Snooker Championship (first held in 2013).

== Office-holders ==
The USSA elects its board of directors, with the following positions filled:

- Executive Director - Alan Morris (Position appointed by the Board)
- President - Ajeya Prabhakar
- Secretary - John Lewis
- Director - Michael Collins (Honorary Life Chairman)
- Director - Ahmed Aly Elsayed
- Director - Raymond Fung
- Director - Michael Dominguez
- Director - Joseph Mejia

== United States National Snooker Championship ==
The USSA stages the annual United States National Snooker Championship, with the winner and runner-up gaining automatic selection to represent the United States in that year's IBSF World Snooker Championship. To be eligible to compete in the Championship, a player must be a citizen of the United States, in accordance of the rules of the IBSF.

== USSA Tour ==
The USSA Tour, which was introduced in 2009, is a series of scheduled snooker events throughout the season which are sanctioned by the USSA and played at various snooker clubs and billiard rooms across the United States.

Any snooker player from around the world may compete in a USSA Tour event, except for those who are current professional playing members of the World Snooker Tour.

- 2009 USSA Tour schedule and results
- 2010 USSA Tour schedule and results
- 2011 USSA Tour schedule and results
- 2011-12 USSA Tour schedule and results
- 2012-13 USSA Tour schedule and results
