= Bye Bye Baby (film) =

- Directed by: Enrico Oldoini
- Screenplay by: Liliane Betti; Paolo Costella; Enrico Oldoini
- Produced by: Pio Andretti; Adriano De Micheli
- Starring: Carol Alt; Luca Barbareschi; Brigitte Nielsen; Jason Connery
- Cinematography: Giuseppe Ruzzolini
- Edited by: Raimondo Crociani
- Music by: Manuel De Sica
- Production companies: Dean Film; Reteitalia
- Distributed by: United International Pictures
- Release date: 4 March 1988 (Italy)
- Running time: 85 minutes
- Country: Italy
- Language: Italian

Bye Bye Baby is a 1988 Italian romantic comedy film directed by Enrico Oldoini. The film starred Brigitte Nielsen and Carol Alt. It is one of the few films to feature five-pin billiards on-screen in any detail.

== Plot summary ==
A couple from Milan, Sandra and Paolo, engage in a series of extramarital affairs, reconciliations, escapades and eventual divorce, beginning during a vacation to Mauritius. Sandra becomes involved with a handsome doctor, Marcello, while Paolo falls for Lisa, a professional five-pin billiards player.

== Cast ==
- Carol Alt as Sandra
- Luca Barbareschi as Paolo
- Brigitte Nielsen as Lisa
- Jason Connery as Dr. Marcello
- Alba Parietti as Daria

== Reception ==
Brigitte Nielsen was nominated for a Golden Raspberry Award for Worst Actress at the 10th Golden Raspberry Awards, where she ended up losing to Heather Locklear for The Return of Swamp Thing.

Los Angeles Times panned the film as thematically repetitive, "daringly banal", and a failure as a sex farce because so little of it is actually comedic. Billiards film review site 8 Ball on the Silver Screen also criticized the film for its unbelievable five-pin billiards scenes that indicated no training of Nielsen for the role.

== See also ==
- List of Italian films of 1988
