= Isa Vandi =

Filmmaker

عیسی وندی Isa Vandi
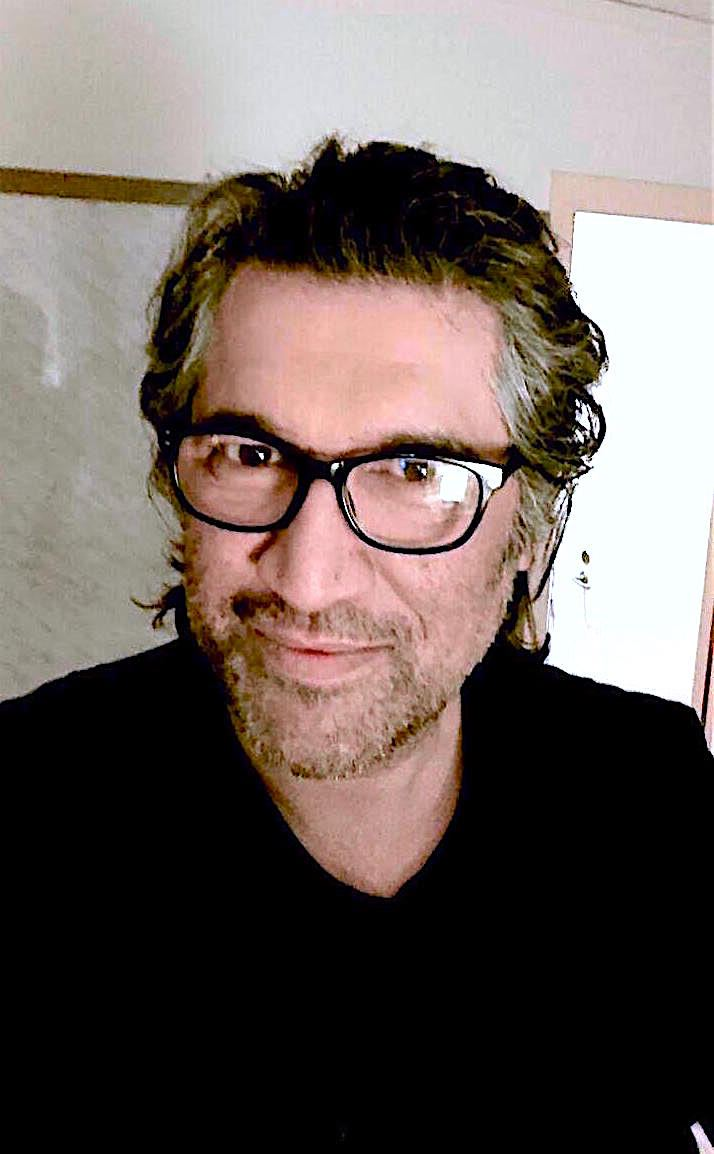
- Vandi in 2019
- Born: 1960 (age 65–66); Iran
- Occupations: Film Producer, Director, Editor, Screenwriter, Designer
- Years active: 1979–present

Isa Vandi (Persian: عیسی وندی; born 1960) is an Iranian-Swedish film producer, director, editor and screenwriter. He emigrated from Iran in 1989, now living and working in Sweden.

== Career ==
Isa started his career on stage at 14 in the Department of Culture and Arts in Sari. He studied acting and directing at the Institute of Dramatic Arts in Tehran. Still, he was not allowed to restart his studies after the Cultural Revolution in Iran. He then worked in several children's TV Series before moving to Sweden in 1989. He established "Scorpion Film" an independent production company in 1995 in Gothenburg, producing fiction films and documentaries for both TV and cinema. Isa has written, produced, directed, and edited more than 15 films, some of which have gained notable recognition. In addition to filmmaking, he has lectured on cinema history, film theory, scriptwriting, and dramaturgy. The prominent themes in his works are people and their solitude.

== Filmography ==
- Loneliness (Ensamhet, 1991)
- The little postman (Lilla brevbärare, 1992)
- How people began to fly (Så här kom man på att flyga, 1993)
- Shit (Skit, 1994)
- The magic shadows (De magiska skuggorna, 1995)
- The white screen (Den vita duken, 1996)
- The girl and the fog (Flickan och dimman, 1997)
- Anti-clockwise (Motsols, 2000)
- My Midsummer (Min Midsommar, 2002)
- Football, friends and tears (Fotboll, vänner och tårar, 2002)
- Dance below white sheets (Dans under vita lakan, 2003)
- Grandpa Kent (Farfar Kent, 2005)
- So faraway yet so close (Så fjärran ändå så nära, 2007)
- One thousand and one night (Tusen och en natt, 2010)
- Come and See (Kom och se, 2012)
- Saccade, (2018)
- Unspoken Words (Osagda ord, 2025)
