= August Roterberg =

Magician, author, and publisher

- Born: August Roterberg; 1867; Hamburg, Germany
- Died: 1928 (aged 60–61)
- Occupation: magic shop owner
- Known for: sleight of hand, card magic

August Roterberg (1867–1928) was born in Hamburg, Germany and emigrated to the United States around 1883 as a teenager. He started out selling magic by mail order, and then opened a magic store in Chicago. It was housed in the lobby of the "old" Palmer House Hotel.

Roterberg is credited for the advent of the modern age of magic publishing. His books were the first written in the English language expressly for magicians. Roterberg's books were published by a magic dealer specifically for sale in magical depots, rather than for wide distribution to the general public. He ended up selling his mail order business in 1908 to Ralph W. Read and his shop to Arthur & Carl Felsman in 1916.

Roterberg is best known as a magic inventor and is credited with inventing the "Multiplying Billiard Balls" trick.

He retired around 1917 and moved to California, where he lived until his death.

== Published works ==
- The Modern Wizard(1895)
- Latter Day Tricks (1896)
- New Era Card Tricks (1897)
- Card Tricks and How To Do Them (1902)

== See also ==
- List of magicians
