= Five-pin billiards =

Form of carom billiards

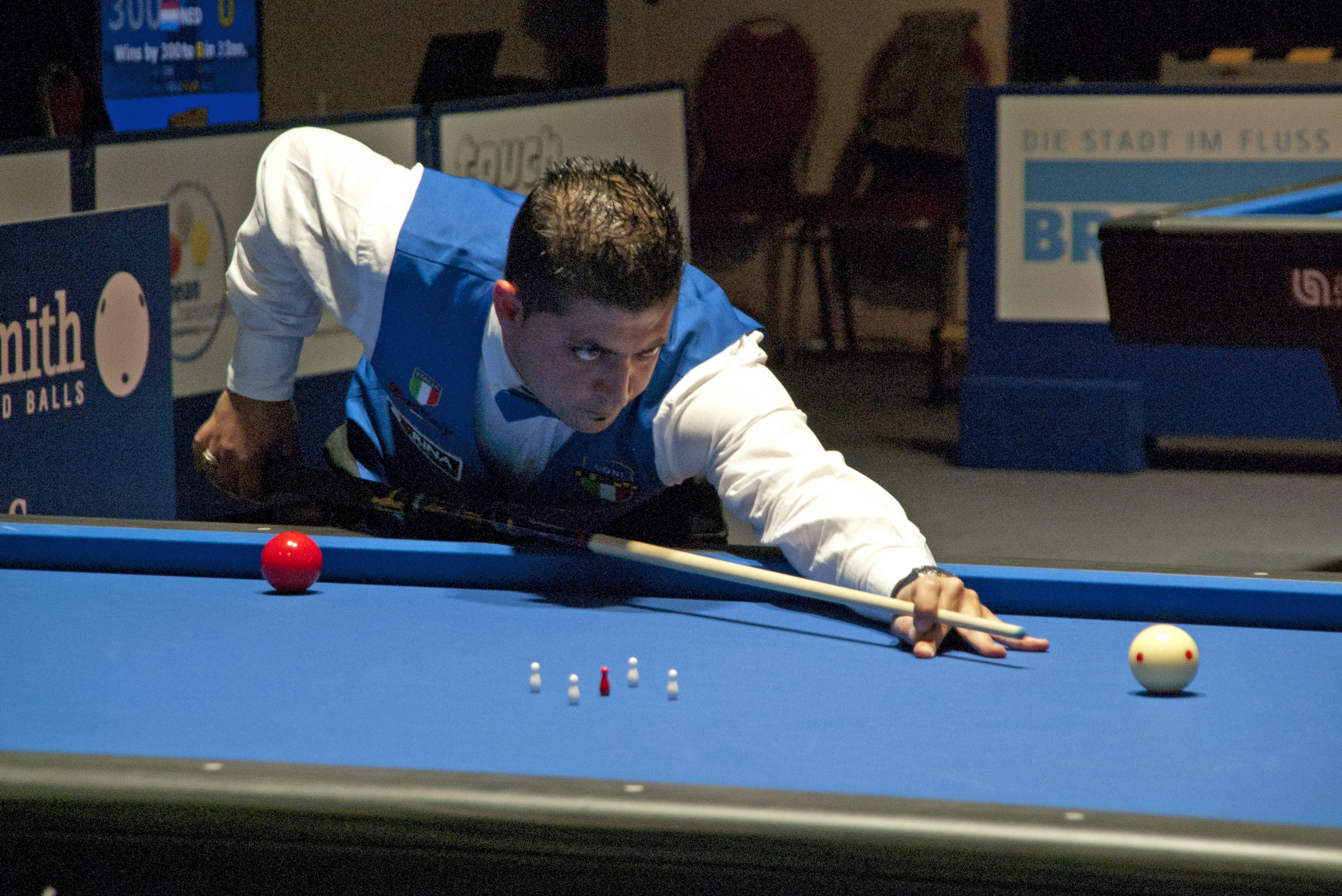
Five-pins game at the European Carom Billiards Championships 2015.

Five-pin billiards or simply five-pins or 5-pins (Italian: [biliardo dei] cinque birilli; Spanish: [billar de] cinco quillas or casín), is today usually a carom billiards form of cue sport, though sometimes still played on a pocket table. In addition to the customary three balls of most carom games, it makes use of a set of five upright pins (skittles) arranged in a "+" pattern at the center of the table. The game is popular especially in Italy, but also in some other parts of Latin America and Europe, with international, televised professional tournaments (for the carom version only). It is sometimes referred to as Italian five-pins or Italian billiards (Italian: biliardo all'italiana), or as simply italiana (in Italian and Spanish). A variant of the game, goriziana or nine-pins, adds additional skittles to the formation. A related pocket game, with larger pins, is played in Scandinavia and is referred to in English as Danish pin billiards, with a Swedish variant that has some rules more similar to the Italian game.

== History ==
Until the late 1980s, the game (with some rules differences) was a form of pocket billiards, known in English as Italian skittle pool, and was principally played in pubs, with an object ball that was smaller than the two cue balls. Professional and regulated amateur play today exclusively uses pocketless tables and equal-sized balls. Professional competition began in 1965, and play is centered in billiard parlors, with players competing in provincial, regional, and national federations. The pocket version is still favored by some in amateur play.

== Equipment and setup ==
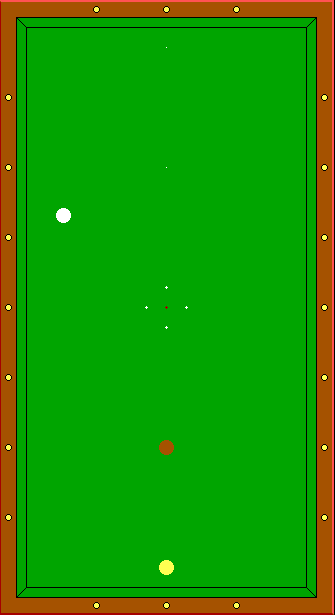
Five-pins table, showing the location of the pins.

The regulation game is played on a normal 5 by 10 ft (1.5 by 3.0 m) pocketless carom billiards table, with standardized playing surface dimensions of 1.42 by 2.84 m (approximately 4-2/3 by 9-1/3 ft), plus/minus 5 mm (approx. 0.2 in), from cushion to cushion. The slate bed of the table must be heated to about 5 degrees C (9 degrees F) above room temperature, which helps to keep moisture out of the cloth to aid the balls rolling and rebounding in a consistent manner, and generally makes the table play "faster". In informal play, an unheated table is often used.

Like most other carom games, five-pins requires three standard carom billiard balls of equal diameter: a cue ball for the first player, typically plain white, another cue ball for the second player, historically white with a spot but now typically yellow, and a red object ball,. The balls are 61.5 millimetres (2.42 in) in diameter and weigh between 205 and 220 g (7.2 and 7.8 oz); 7.5 oz is average). The white cue ball is given to the starting player, who may place it anywhere on the head side of the table (without disturbing the pins)—i.e., anywhere unobstructed between the head rail and the center string. The red object ball is placed at the foot spot (i.e., the intersection of the foot string and the long string. The yellow (or spotted white) cue ball of the opponent is placed on the long string, in a position that can be labelled the "foot rail spot", 10 cm (approx. 4 in) from the foot rail.

As the name implies, the game makes use of five upright pins called skittles in English (so-called since at least 1634), birilli (singular birillo) in Italian and quillas in Spanish, which look like miniature bowling pins, 25 mm (0.98 in) tall, and with 7 mm (0.28 in) round, flat-bottomed bases. There are traditionally four white pins, and one red. The red pin is placed on the center spot (the exact middle of the table both lengthwise and widthwise), and the four white pins are placed equidistant from the red in a square diamond pattern around it. Two whites are aligned along the center string with the head and foot spots, as well as the rail diamonds in the center of the head and foot rails, and with the red object ball, and red pin. Meanwhile, the other two whites are placed on the center string, aligned with the diamonds in the center of the long rails, and again with the red pin. The final pattern looks like a plus sign. This arrangement of pins on the table is referred to as the "castle". Tables have the precise castle positions for the pins, and for the starting positions of the balls, permanently marked, as they must be placed back into position before every shot if any have been knocked over or moved.

Each player uses a cue stick to shoot the appropriate cue ball; average cue length is 140 cm (about 55 in.) A bridge stick (rest) may be used to reach long shots.

== Rules ==
Though there are variants in Central and South America, the Italian five-pins rules are the best codified. Because the Italian-rules championships organized by the Italian Federation of Billiard Sport (FIBiS) are international, televised events, and often hosted outside of Italy, the FIBiS rules are the global de facto standard, and have been incorporated into the rules promulgated by the Union Mondiale de Billard.

=== Object ===
The goal of the game is to earn a required number of points, before one's opponent does, by using one's cue ball to cause the opponent's cue ball to knock over pins (and to not do so with one's own cue ball), and by contacting the red object ball with either cue ball, after one's own cue ball has contacted that of the opponent, and/or by causing the object ball to knock over pins, again after one's own cue ball has contacted that of the opponent.

=== Play ===
The game is played by two players or by two teams (a pair of doubles partners most commonly, but also larger teams). Determining who goes first can be done by any means (lag usually, but also coin toss, tournament stipulations about player order, etc.). Each player or team is assigned one of the two cue balls; this is the only cue ball they may hit with the cue stick. The first player or team always uses the (plain) white cue ball, the opponent the other ball. Unlike in many games, shots are always taken in rotation – the same player or team never shoots twice in a row even if they have scored (other than if the opponent fouled before actually shooting when their turn came up, such as by moving one of the balls accidentally). Play continues until one player or team wins by being the first to achieve or exceed a specific number of points (usually 50 or 60), either agreed upon beforehand by the players, or set by tournament organizers. In informal play, the number is often lower, such as 25.

In order to score, the incoming player or team must stroke the assigned cue ball (sometimes called the battente or "clapper") to carom off the opponent's cue ball (sometimes called the "receiver") — either directly or off a cushion — with the goal of secondarily having the opponent's cue ball, directly or by way of rebounding off a cushion, next hit the pins and/or the red object ball (sometimes called the pallino ("bullet") or "jack", terms common to several other games, such as bocce).

Unlike in the major carom game three-cushion billiards, there is no requirement to hit one or more cushions at any time.

=== Scoring ===
Knocking over pins, by any of the acceptable prescribed manners, earns cumulative points as follows:

- Each white pin is worth two points.
- The red pin is worth four points, if white pins were also knocked over.
- The red pin is usually worth eight points, if it is the only pin knocked down (by the ball going between the set of pins and narrowly missing all of the whites). In professional settings, the points are 10 since 2013.
- Knocking over pins with the object ball without hitting the opponent's cue ball first, or with one's own cue ball, does not earn the shooter any points, and in the latter case is a foul that awards points to the opponent.

The acceptable means of knocking over pins include any that result from hitting the opponent's object ball first with one's own, and not hitting the pins with one's own cue ball. For example, one can simply send the opponent's cue ball into the pins, send the opponent's cue ball into the red object ball and have the object ball hit the pins, or hit the opponent's cue ball and then the object ball with one's own cue ball and send the object ball into the pins.

The object ball itself is also worth points:

- If struck by the opponent's cue ball (after the shooter strikes the opponent's cue ball with his/her own), it is worth 3 points (this is known as a casin or in broader terminology a combination shot).
- If struck by the shooter's cue ball (after the shooter strikes the opponent's cue ball with his/her own), it is worth 4 points (this is considered a true billiard/carom or carambola in this game's nomenclature).
- If both a casin and a carambola are achieved in the same shot, only the earliest of the two to occur earns points; they are not combined, though either may still combine with points scored from pins.

=== Fouls ===
The game has some fouls unique to its ruleset, as well as the usual fouls of billiards games. All fouls nullify any points the shooter would have earned on the foul shot, and award the opponent free points (which vary depending on the type of foul).

- Knocking over pins with the shooter's own cue ball, after having hit the opponent's cue ball—this foul awards the point values of those pins to the opponent. (In player jargon this is referred to as "drinking" one's points, as they are lost like the contents of an empty glass); opponent does not receive ball-in-hand. (Note: Knocking over pins with the red object ball on an otherwise legal shot is not a foul, and has no effect on the score (i.e., provided that the opponent's cue ball was struck first by one's own cue ball, either cue ball can be used to drive the object ball into the pins, provided that both cue balls make initial contact with each other.)
- Failure to hit the opponent's cue ball at all with the shooter's own—opponent receives ball-in-hand plus 2 points.
- Hitting the pins directly with the shooter's cue ball before any contact with the opponent's cue ball; opponent receives ball-in-hand plus 2 points (the erstwhile value of the knocked-over pins is not calculated at all).
- Hitting the object ball directly with the shooter's cue ball before any contact with the opponent's cue ball; opponent receives ball-in-hand plus 2 points.
- Knocking any ball off the table; opponent receives ball-in-hand plus 2 points (the ball is spotted in its starting position, or as close to this position as possible, unless it was the now-incoming opponent's cue ball, which as noted is in-hand).
- Jumping the cue ball entirely or partially over an interfering ball; opponent receives ball-in-hand plus 2 points.
- Standard billiards-wide fouls also apply and yield ball-in-hand plus 2 points (moving balls accidentally, double-hitting the cue ball, push shots, etc.

Because of the particularity of the first-listed foul above, players watch the game carefully, and tournaments have referees. Any points earned by the shooter on a foul shot are awarded to the opponent (except when, as noted above, pin value is not calculated). An extra 2 points go to the opponent if the object ball was correctly hit on an otherwise foul stroke (in addition to being awarded the 3 or 4 points the object ball was worth). Ball-in-hand on fouls is not entirely free; the incoming shooter after a ball-in-hand foul can only place his/her cue ball on the opposite half of the table from the other cue ball, and must shoot from the end (short part) not side of the table. The cue ball does not have to be placed in the kitchen (behind the head string), just within the proper half of the table.

== Strategy ==
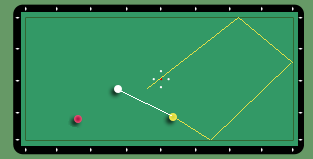
A fairly easy three-rail bank shot on the castle.

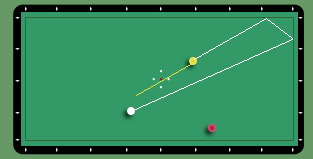
A challenging two-rail kick shot at the castle.

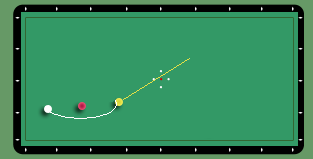
A daring massé shot on the castle, from a snookered position. A kick shot would be a higher-probability shot selection for most players.

Five-pins integrates some of the target-shooting aspects of pool, snooker, etc. (perhaps via the influence of English billiards) into carom billiards, which is otherwise oriented at scoring carom points.

Safety play and cue ball control are essential when attempting to score, with the goal of leaving the balls in such a position that the incoming opponent is hooked (snookered) and will have a difficult bank, kick, or massé shot to perform.

Because kicks and banks are so common, players must be more skilled at these shots than they would need to be for most other cue sports. The game also requires a good understanding of carom angles and the effects of "English" (sidespin) on the cue ball.

== Five-pins National Team World Championship ==
Organized by the Union Mondiale de Billard (UMB), and inaugurated in 2019, the Five-pins National Team World Championship is an international event. Italy won the first edition for national teams of 5 pins in Lugano (Switzerland), the second edition in Hall in Tirol (Austria) and the third edition in Madrid (Spain).

=== Team champions ===
Year	Location	Gold	Silver	Bronze
2019	(Switzerland) Lugano	Italy (ITA)	Uruguay (URU)	Argentina (ARG); Germany (GER)
2023	(Austria) Hall in Tirol	Italy (ITA)	Uruguay (URU)	Denmark (DEN); Argentina (ARG)
2025	(Spain) Madrid	Italy (ITA)	Argentina (ARG)	Denmark (DEN); Uruguay (URU)

== Five-pins Individual World Championship ==
Inaugurated in 1965, the Five-pins Individual World Championship (Campionato del Mondo "5 Birilli", sometimes also referred to as the World Open) is an international event, hosted to date in various places in Italy, Argentina, Switzerland and Spain. It is semi-annual; many years since its inception have not featured such a tournament. There are various divisions, including youth, women, men, teams, and a one-on-one open championship.

=== Individual champions ===
Note: In several years, events were not held.

Date	Location	Winner	Nationality
1965	Santa Fe, Argentina	Manuel Gómez	Argentina
1968	Bell Ville, Argentina	Anselmo Berrondo	Uruguay
1975	Campione d'Italia, Italy	Domenico Acanfora	Italy
1978	Bell Ville, Argentina	Ricardo Fantasia	Argentina
1979	Pesaro, Italy	Attilio Sessa	Italy
1980	Necochea, Argentina	Néstor Gómez	Argentina
1982	Loano, Italy	Néstor Gómez	Argentina
1983	Marcos Juárez, Argentina	Miguel Ángel Borrelli	Argentina
1985	Spoleto, Italy	Giampiero Rosanna	Italy
1987	Milan, Italy	Carlo Cifalà	Italy
1989	Chiasso, Switzerland	Gustavo Torregiani	Argentina
1990	Brescia, Italy	Gustavo Torregiani	Argentina
1992	Arezzo, Italy	Giampiero Rosanna	Italy
1993	Bolivar, Argentina	Fabio Cavazzana	Italy
1995	Fiuggi, Italy	Gustavo Zito	Italy
1998	Ferrara, Italy	David Martinelli	Italy
1999	Necochea, Argentina	Gustavo Zito	Italy
2003	Legnano, Italy	Crocefisso Maggio	Italy
2006	Seville, Spain	Michelangelo Aniello	Italy
2008	Sarteano di Siena, Italy	Andrea Quarta	Italy
2009	Villa María, Argentina	Gustavo Torregiani	Argentina
2015	Milan, Italy	Matteo Gualemi	Italy
2017	Necochea, Argentina	Alejandro Martinotti	Argentina
2019	Pistoia, Italy	Ciro Davide Rizzo	Italy
2022	Calangianus	Andrea Quarta	Italy
2024	Venaria Reale	Andrea Ragonesi	Italy
2026	Marcos Juárez	Antonio La Manna	Italy

== Five-pins Pro World Cup ==
Organized by Italian Federation of Billiard Sport (FIBiS), the Five-pins Pro World Cup (World Cup Pro "5 Birilli"), was a semi-annual event begun in 1993, and discontinued after 1997. In only one year (1993) were both the Pro World Cup and the World Championships held. The event was a one-on-one invitational championship, without other divisions.

=== Pro World Cup champions ===
Note: In 1995, the event was not held.

Date	Location	Winner	Nationality
1993	Cannes, France	Salvatore Mannone	Italy
1994	Saint-Vincent, Italy	Gustavo Adrian Zito	Argentina (Note: The published FIBiS records list Zito as representing Argentina in this particular instance. He started representing Italy in 1995.)
1996	Saint-Vincent, Italy	David Martinelli	Italy
1997	Todi, Italy	Gustavo Adrian Zito	Italy

== Nine-pin variant (goriziana) ==
A professionally competitive version known as goriziana (or nine-pins, 9-pins, nine-pin billiards, etc.) adds four additional outer pins to the "+" pattern, and has a more complicated scoring system. Goriziana itself also has multiple amateur rules variants.

== In popular culture ==
Five-pins is a major plot point of the Italian-produced, English-language drama/romance film Bye Bye Baby, which stars Brigitte Nielsen as a professional player. The movie does not focus on five-pins, but does demonstrate many aspects of the game clearly in a few sequences.

== See also ==
- Boccette
- Goriziana
