= American CueSports Alliance =

US-based pool league sanctioning body

ACS logo

The American CueSports Alliance (abbreviated ACS) is a non-profit league-sanctioning body for cue sports in the United States. They produce national billiards tournaments on an annual basis, in areas such as eight-ball and nine-ball.

The ACS's stated mission is "to heighten the interest and awareness of cue sports through the support and sanctioning of organized competition throughout the United States and North America." The ACS is headquartered in Green Bay, Wisconsin.

== Canadian Cue Sport Association ==
The ACS has a Canadian affiliate organization, the Canadian Cue Sport Association (CCS). There is an annual ACS/CCS international championship in Las Vegas, Nevada, held in May. CCS is also affiliated with the Canadian Billiards and Snooker Association (CBSA).

== See also ==
- List of professional sports leagues
