= Saluc =

Logo of Saluc S.A.

Saluc S.A. is a Belgian speciality manufacturing company. Founded in 1923, they are best known for their Aramith brand billiard balls. The company also manufactures other sorts of balls and bearings with high engineering tolerances for a wide variety of industrial and consumer-product applications, such as Logitech trackballs. Saluc also manufactures Aramith nine-pin bowling balls for the European market.

== History ==
Aramith billiard balls are made in Belgium, in a process using phenolic resin.

Aramith balls are used on the professional World Snooker Tour and the Matchroom Sport pool events.
