= Paul Vandy =

Paul Vandy (c. 1874 – 19 October 1950) was the stage name of Charles Edward Maynard (born Charles Edward Davis), known as the juggling magician, who was a prolific performer from around 1894 to 1930 and is credited as the originator of magical juggling.

Billed as "The World Famous Magical Juggler", "The Jocular Juggler", "The Juggler King", "The Great Vandy", "the Best Plate Juggler on Earth", "the Greatest Juggling Novelty in the World", "the Peerless Vandy" and "England's Extraordinary Entertainer", he was primarily a juggler and equilibrist but also gained notoriety as a magician as his career progressed.

Over nearly 5 decades Vandy's performances branched from the music hall circuits of the UK to the leading theatres of Europe, America and South Africa.

Vandy was one of the owners of the Accrington Hippodrome (prior to it burning down circa 1908) along with Fred Willmott, Frederick Edward Weisker, John Leopold Weisker, William Johnson, and Albert Lindsay Parkinson. He was the partner of Ernest Valentine D'Iffanger (professionally known as Ernest Valentine) in a Theatrical, Musical and Variety Agency, located at 11 Nassau Street, Shaftesbury Avenue, under the style of Valentine's Agency; a business that Vandy took sole ownership of in late 1902. Vandy was also the proprietor of the Magical Pastimes Co and Vandy's Magic Saloon (West Pier, Brighton).

== Performance career ==
=== 1892 – already a juggling success by the age of 18 ===
When he started out he was represented by Tom Coleno of Nottingham. His act was so successful that at the age of 18 in 1892 a challenge was issued in The Era which read: "PAUL VANDY – the Novel, Fantastic Young Juggler and Equilibrist". At this age, his tricks featured juggling with lamps, blocks, plates.

The first reference to Vandy's performance is found in The Era on 9 September 1892 and is described just two months later by the same publication as juggling with "incredible dexterity." By the end of 1893 he was billing in all Moss & Thornton music halls across the UK. At the age of just 19 the national newspapers were singing his praises. The Guardian described him as someone "who showed no little skills in his manipulations" and the Daily Mail described him as "a thorough master of his business". By the summer of 1893 he was being regularly billed as "The Great Vandy." By the summer of 1895 Vandy had become a top billing specialty act renowned throughout Great Britain and Ireland as "the Phenomenom." In August 1895 he was requested to bring his magical juggling act to South Africa and set sail on the S.S. Spartan immediately. The first tour of South Africa was a great success and lasted until December 1895.

By 1897 Vandy was heading playbills internationally as "The Greatest Juggling Novelty in the World" and in February 1897 he became the highest paid specialist act on record when he agreed to tour South Africa with Fillis' Grand Circus to great acclaim. He returned from South Africa to tour Ireland with repeated encore performances and rave reviews; he was most notable when he did a performance at the Empire Palace Theatre in Dublin in December 1897.

At the end of 1898, Vandy was specially engaged for Keith’s Circuit in the USA. by H.H. Felber, Esq. at yet again record salary for a British speciality act. Around 1898 Vandy is repeatedly referred to as the originator of the evening dress act which was gaining popularity. On 31 December 1898 Mr. L. Livermore described Vandy as absolutely the greatest juggling novelty ever seen.

=== 1900s – Vandy starts to introduce magic into his act. ===
In 1900 Vandy toured the United States and France extensively, highlights of which were performances at the Union Square Theatre in New York and the Casino de Paris. His performance at the Tivoli Theatre in London on 24 November 1900.

=== 1907 – Begins a business ===
By 1907, not only had Vandy integrated magic and conjuring into his impressive juggling act, he had also begun to issue catalogues of magical novelties as part of his business the Magical Pastimes Co. at that point operating from Barnes, Surrey.

=== 1908 – Successfully combines magic and juggling ===
In May 1908, Vandy performed at the King's Theatre in Edinburgh then in October 1908, following a performance at the Chelsea Palace in London, Vandy had raised the standard of the magical element of his act to such a level that he was no longer referred to as merely a trickster. In April 1909, Vandy starred alongside Annie Abbott at the Hippodrome Accrington.

== Businesses ==
He published a house organ of general interest for his business called Conjuring in 1914. Vandy also owned a magical depot at 156 Western Road, Brighton.

=== The Act ===
Vandy's novelty act at The Tivoli, Manchester on 7 July 1913 was fully described in Magical World, New Series (July 1913) with particular attention given to the trick christened "Watch it" confirming that Vandy was the tricks originator. Later that year, at the Hippodromes of Brighton and Portsmouth The Stage stated that "Paul Vandy mystifies the audience with his magical juggling feats." By December 1913, the Alhambra Theatre, London proudly billed Vandy as "The World's Greatest Magical Juggler."

== Death ==
Vandy died on 19 October 1950 in his home at Wentworth House, The Green, Richmond, Surrey in his late seventies. He left a wife, Lilly Maynard and two sons Charles Harry Maynard and Edward Vandy Maynard.
