= Goriziana =

Carom billiards game

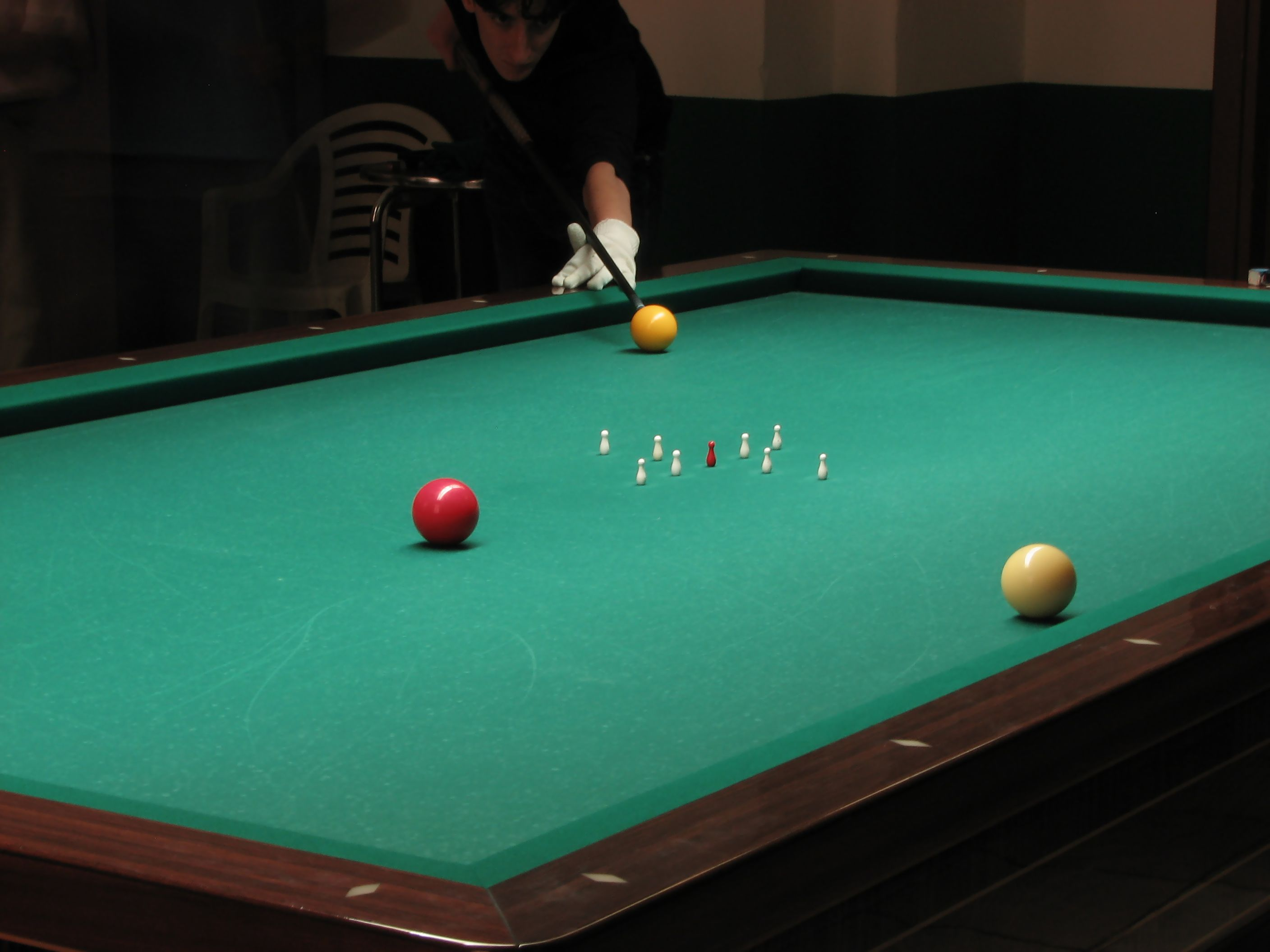
Nine-pins table

Goriziana or nine-pin billiards (also known as nine-pins, 9-pins, etc.) is a carom billiards game, especially popular in Italy.

Like the cue sport most closely related to it, five-pin billiards, goriziana is played on a 284 cm by 142 cm table.

== Rules ==
In goriziana, nine pins sit in the middle of the table (this area is called castello which is Italian for "castle"). Three balls are used, of which two are cue balls. The game is played by two teams of one or two players. Each team or player aims to hit the opponent's ball and, from there, score points by striking the red ball, or by making the opponent's balls or the red ball knock over the pins.

Unlike in many games, shots are always taken in rotation – the same player or team never shoots twice in a row, even if they have scored. The only exception is if the opponent fouls before shooting, such as by moving one of the balls accidentally. Play continues until one player or team wins by being the first to reach or exceed a specific number of points (usually 200 or 300). This number is agreed upon beforehand by the players.

The main difference between five-pins and nine-pins is in scoring. Point values are more complex than and increased from those of the simpler five-pin game.

=== Scoring and fouls ===
Scoring:

- Two points are awarded for every external pin knocked over;
- Eight points for every internal pin knocked over;
- Ten points for knocking over the red central pin together with one or more white pins;
- Thirty points for knocking over the red central pin only;
- Six points if the cue ball strikes the opponent's ball correctly and causes the opponent's ball to strike the red ball;
- Six points if the cue ball strikes the opponent's ball correctly and then strikes the red ball

In case of a foul, two points are deducted, and any points the shooter would have earned on the foul shot are nullified. Examples of fouls:

- Failure to strike the shooter's own cue ball correctly;
- Failure to strike the opponent's cue ball with the shooter's own;
- Knocking over pins with the shooter's own cue ball before hitting the opponent's cue ball;
- Hitting the red ball before hitting the opponent's cue ball.

== Variants ==
Goriziana is primarily popular in Italy, and amateur players there have developed many variants of the game. Some of these variants are played in tournaments.

=== Goriziana ×2 ===
This variant, also called tutti doppi ("all-doubled"), is officially recognized by the Italian Federation of Billiard Sports (FIBiS). The point values in the normal game are doubled in this version:

- Four points for every external pin knocked over;
- Sixteen points for every internal pin knocked over;
- Twenty points for knocking over the red central pin together with one or more white pins;
- Sixty points for knocking over the red central pin only;
- Twelve points if the cue ball strikes the opponent's ball correctly and causes the opponent's ball to strike the red ball;
- Twelve points if the cue ball strikes the opponent's ball correctly and then strikes the red ball;
- Four points are taken away if the shooter's ball fails to strike the opponent's cue ball.

=== Filotto ===
This variant is the same as goriziana ×2, except that the score for striking the red pin alone is eighty points instead of sixty, and eighty points are also awarded if five pins in a vertical or horizontal row are struck.
