= Billiard ball =

Ball used in cue sports

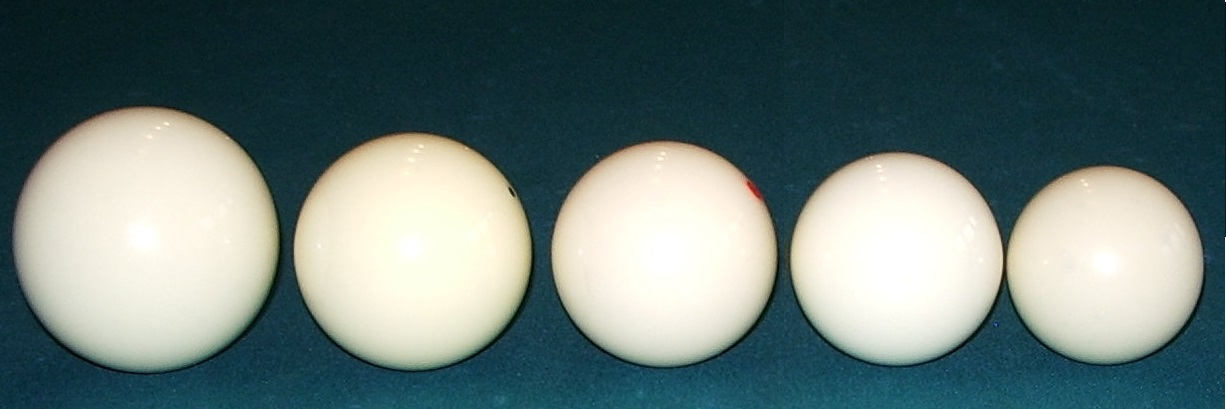
Cue balls from (left to right): Russian pyramid and kaisa—68 mm (2 11/16 in); Carom—61.5 mm (2 7/16 in); International pool—57.15 mm (2 1/4 in); Snooker and English billiards—52.5 mm (2 1/16 in); British-style pool—51 mm (2 in)

A billiard ball is a small, hard ball used in cue sports, such as carom billiards, pool, and snooker. The number, type, diameter, color, and pattern of the balls differ depending upon the specific game being played. Various particular ball properties such as hardness, friction coefficient, and resilience are important to accuracy.

== History ==
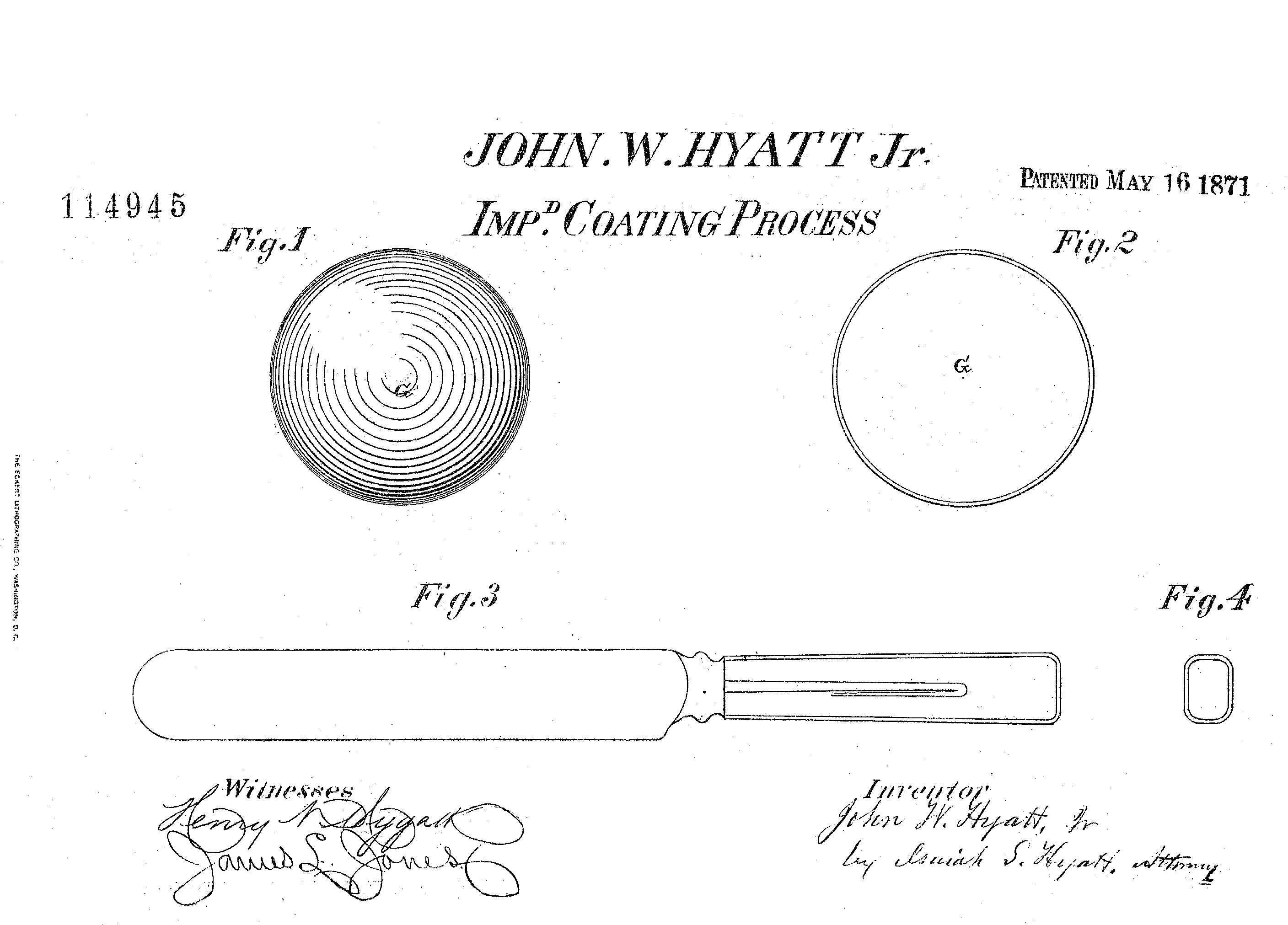
Hyatt's celluloid ball patent (1871)

Early balls were made of various materials, including wood and clay (the latter remaining in use well into the 20th century). Although affordable ox-bone balls were in common use in Europe, elephant ivory was favored since at least 1627 until the early 20th century; the earliest known written reference to ivory billiard balls is in the 1588 inventory of Thomas Howard, 4th Duke of Norfolk. Dyed and numbered balls appeared around the early 1770s. By the mid-19th century, elephants were being slaughtered for their ivory at an alarming rate, just to keep up with the demand for high-end billiard balls – no more than eight balls could be made from a single elephant's tusks. The billiard industry realized that the supply of elephants (their primary source of ivory) was endangered, as well as dangerous to obtain (the latter an issue of notable public concern at the turn of the 19th century). Inventors were challenged to come up with an alternative material that could be manufactured, with a US$10,000 (worth approximately $241,875 in 2025) prize being offered by a New York supplier.

Although not the first artificial substance to be used for the balls (e.g. Sorel cement, invented in 1867, was marketed as an artificial ivory), John Wesley Hyatt patented an "ivory imitation" composite made of nitrocellulose, camphor, and ground cattle bone on May 4, 1869 (US patent 89582, the first US billiard ball patent). The material was a success, and was sold as Bonzoline, Crystalate, Ivorylene until the 1960s, and was used by prominent professional players such as John Roberts Jr (1847–1919), Charles Dawson (1866–1921), and Walter Lindrum (1898–1960). The ivory substitute was one of the most significant early reinforced plastics; induced the global growth of billiards, pool, and snooker; and helped create a modern idea that the artificial can surpass the natural. It is unclear if the cash prize was ever awarded, and there is no evidence suggesting he did in fact win it.

However, Hyatt's composite had problems. One of the most relevant is cellulose nitrate flammability, not because of making the billiard balls explode, as is often claimed, but because of the dangers of handling it in its pure form during manufacturing. Another problem was related to camphor mass exploitation, leading to the devastation of Taiwan's forests and displacement of indigenous communities. Subsequently, the industry experimented with various other synthetic materials for billiard balls such as Bakelite, acrylic, and other plastic compounds.

The exacting requirements of the billiard ball are met today with balls cast from plastic materials that are strongly resistant to cracking and chipping. Currently Saluc, under the brand name Aramith and other private labels, manufactures phenolic resin balls. Other plastics and resins such as polyester (similar to those used for bowling balls) and clear acrylic are also used.

Ivory balls remained in use in artistic billiards competition until the late 20th century.

== Types ==
=== Carom billiards ===
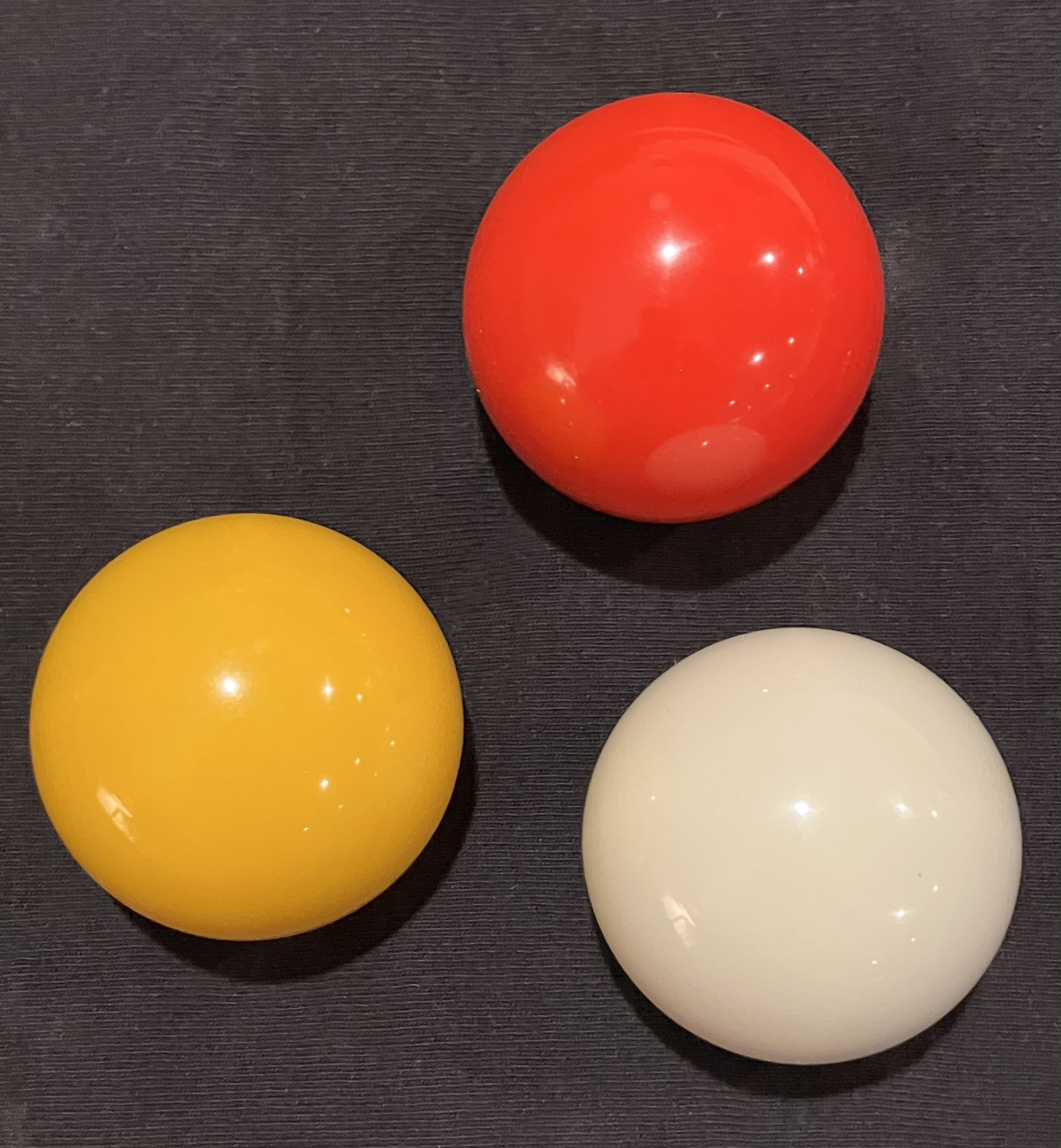
Standard modern carom balls

In the realm of carom billiards games, three balls are used to play most games on pocketless billiards tables. Carom balls are not numbered, and are 61–61.5 mm (approximately 2 13/32 in) in diameter, and a weight ranging between 205 and 220 grams (7.2 and 7.8 oz) with a typical weight of 210 g (7.5 oz). They are typically colored as follows:

- White: cue ball for the first player
- Yellow: cue ball for the second player (historically this was white with a distinguishing spot)
- Red: the object ball

Four-ball billiards uses an extra object ball, usually blue.

=== English billiards ===
English billiards uses the same number of balls as carom billiards, but the same size as snooker balls, as the game is played on the same size table as snooker. Each player uses a separate cue ball, with modern English billiards sets using one white ball and the other being yellow, with some versions sporting both balls red spots. The object ball used is red, with some versions sporting white spots.

=== Pool ===
1	Solid yellow
2	Solid blue
3	Solid red
4	Solid purple
5	Solid orange
6	Solid green
7	Solid maroon
8	Solid black
9	Yellow stripe
10	Blue stripe
11	Red stripe
12	Purple stripe
13	Orange stripe
14	Green stripe
15	Maroon stripe
•	White

Pool balls are used to play various pool games, such as eight-ball, nine-ball, and straight pool. These balls, the most widely used throughout the world, are smaller than carom billiards balls, and larger than those for snooker. According to World Pool-Billiard Association equipment specifications, the diameter is 2 1/4 in (57 mm), plus or minus 0.005 in (0.127 mm) and weigh between 5 1/2 and 6 oz (160 and 170 g).

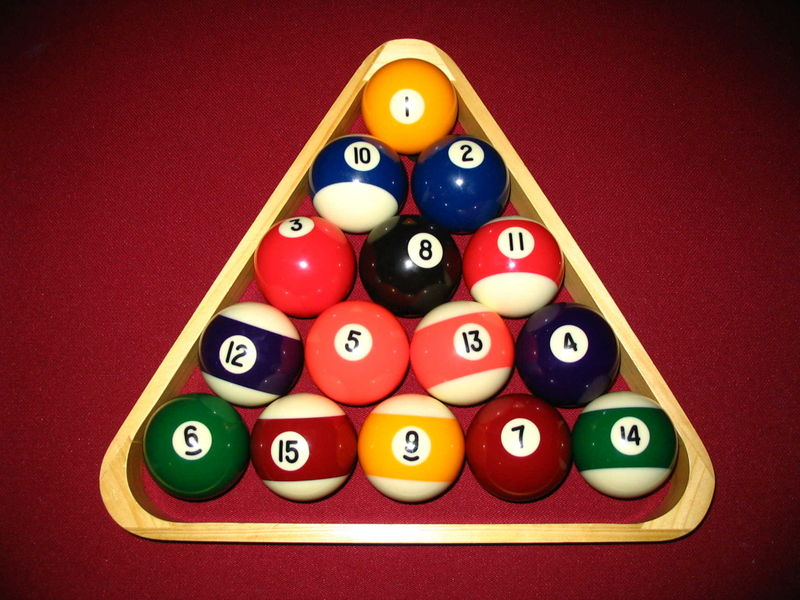
Pool balls in a rack

The balls are numbered and colored as in the table show here. Balls 1 through 7 are the suit of solids and 9 through 15 are the stripes. The 8 ball is not considered part of either suit. Striped balls were introduced around 1889.

Rotation games do not distinguish between solids and stripes, but rather use the numbering on the balls to determine which object ball must be pocketed. In other games such as straight pool neither type of marking is of any consequence.

Some balls used in televised pool games are colored differently in order to make them more distinguishable on television monitors. Most commonly, the dark purple used on the 4 and 12 balls is replaced by pink to make it easier to distinguish the 4 from the black 8 ball, and similarly the 7 and 15 balls use a lighter brown color instead of a deep maroon. Other, less common color substitutions are also found, dependent on manufacturer. These sets often have a cue ball with multiple spots on its surface so that spin placed on it is evident to viewers.

Baseball billiards uses 21 balls instead of 15, adding 6 extra striped balls, with the 16 ball being black and the 17 through 21 balls being the same colors as the 9 through 13 balls.

Coin-operated pool tables, such as those found at bowling alleys, arcades, or bars/pubs, may use a slightly different-sized cue ball, so that the cue ball can be separated from object balls by the table's ball return mechanism and delivered into its own ball return. Such different sized cue balls are considered less than ideal because they change the dynamics of the equipment. Other tables use a system where a magnet pulls a cue ball with a thin layer of metal embedded inside away from the object ball collection chamber and into the cue ball return, allowing the cue ball to more closely match the object balls in size and weight. More recently, optical systems that recognize the cue ball, which is more translucent than the other balls due to its solid white color, and separate it mechanically have been developed.

=== British-style eight-ball pool ===
In British-style eight-ball pool and its blackball variant, fifteen object balls are used, but fall into two unnumbered groups, the reds (or less commonly blues) and yellows, with a white cue ball, and black 8 ball.

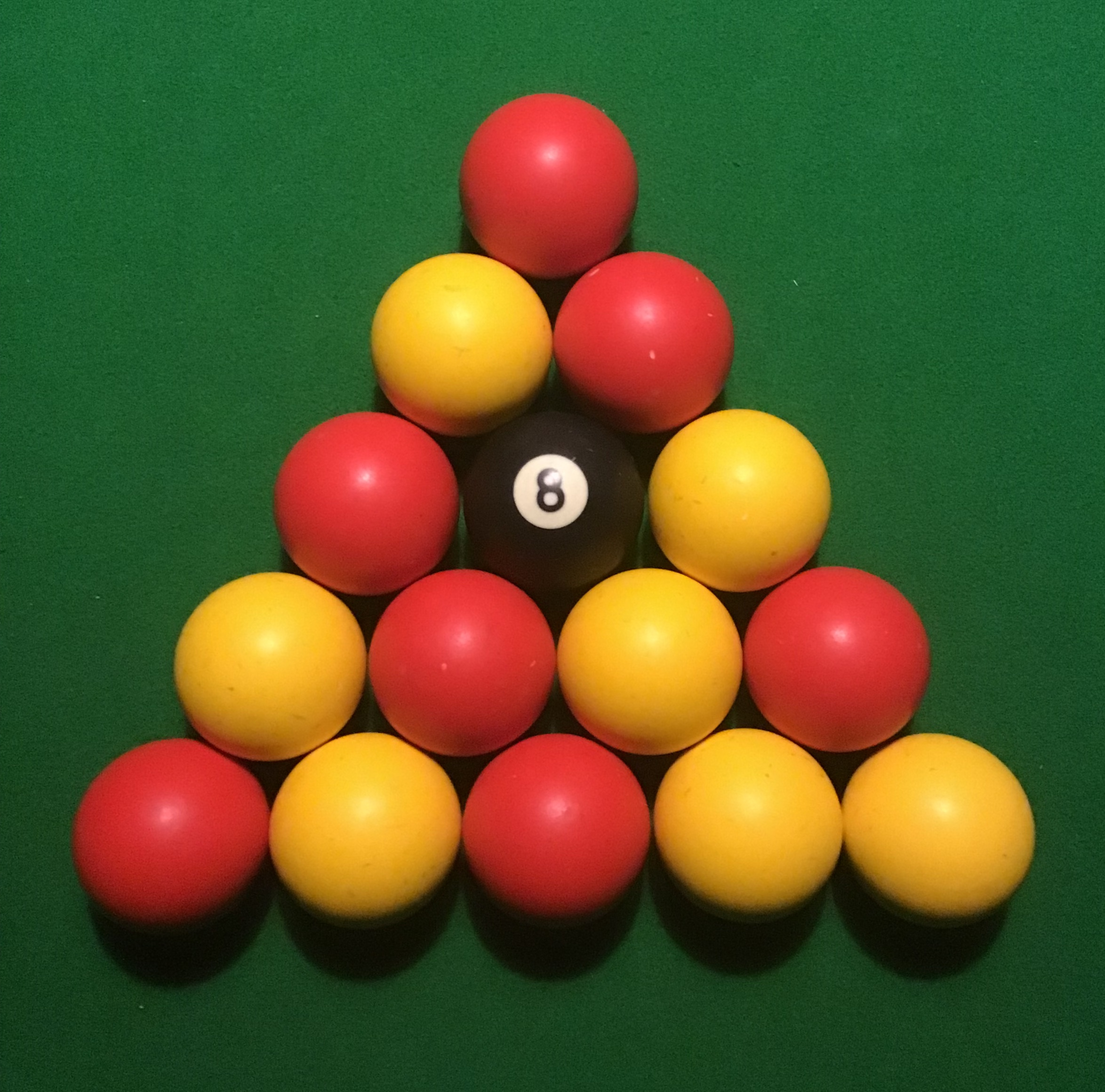
Setup for blackball

Aside from the 8, shots are not called since there is no reliable way to identify particular balls to be pocketed. Because they are unnumbered, they are wholly unsuited to certain pool games, such as nine-ball, in which ball order is important. They are typically smaller than the American-style balls; the most common object ball diameters are 2 in (51 mm) and 2 1/16 in (52 mm). The yellow-and-red sets are sometimes referred to as "casino sets" as they were developed to make identification of suits easier for spectators at eight-ball championships often held in casinos. Such sets were sold by the Brunswick–Balke–Collender Co. as early as 1908. Similar to standard pool balls, there are also special sets designed for televised games; these sets have a black-striped 8 ball, and a spotted cue ball.

=== Snooker ===
Colour	Value
White	N/A
Red	1 point
Yellow	2 points
Green	3 points
Brown	4 points
Blue	5 points
Pink	6 points
Black	7 points

Ball sets for snooker consist of twenty-two balls in total, arranged as a rack of 15 unmarked red balls, six colour balls placed at various predetermined spots on the table, and a white cue ball. The colour balls are sometimes numbered with their point values in the style of pool balls for the home market.

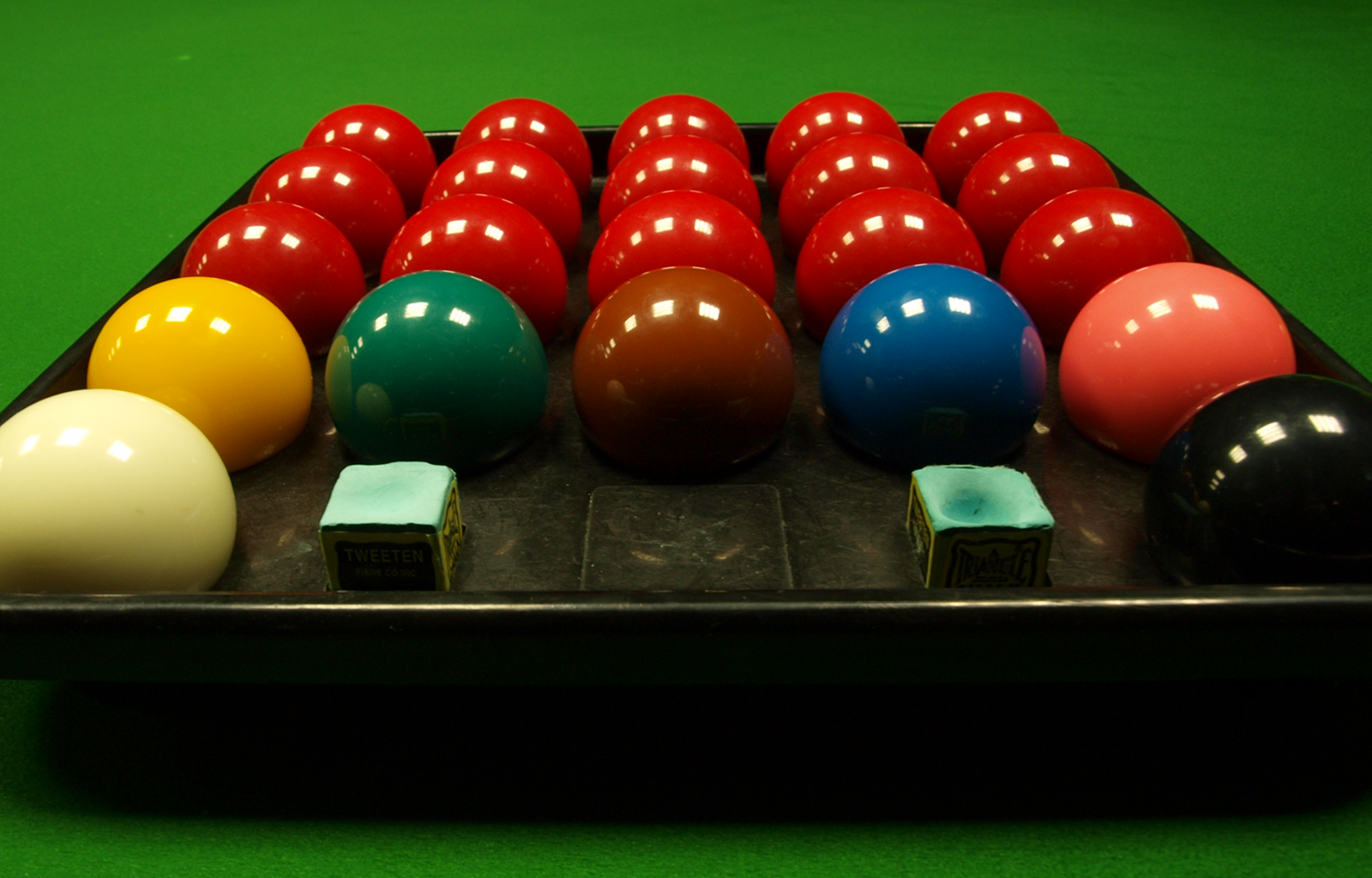
A complete set of snooker balls

Snooker balls are standardized at 52.5 mm (2 1/16 in) in diameter within a tolerance of plus or minus 0.05 mm (0.002 in). No standard weight is defined, but all balls in the set must be the same weight within a tolerance of 3 g (0.11 oz). Snooker sets are also available with considerably smaller-than-regulation balls (and even with ten instead of fifteen reds) for play on smaller tables (down to half-size), and are sanctioned for use in some amateur leagues. Sets for American snooker are typically 2 1/8 in (54.0 mm), with numbered colour balls.

The set of eight colours used for snooker balls (including white) are thought to be derived from croquet, which uses the same set of colors. Snooker was invented in 1884 by British Army officers stationed in India. Croquet reached its peak popularity at the same time, particularly among people in the same social context. There are many other similarities between croquet and snooker, which when taken together, suggest that the derivation of the latter owes much to the existence of the former.

Some snooker variations use extra balls:

- Snooker plus - uses an orange ball with a value of 8 points and a purple ball with a value of 10 points.
- Power Snooker - uses a white ball with red stripe (similar to the 11 ball in Pool) which doubles all the ball values for 30 seconds.
- Tenball - uses a yellow ball with black cross with a value of 10 points.
- Riyadh Season snooker - uses a gold ball with a value of 20 points.

=== Other games ===
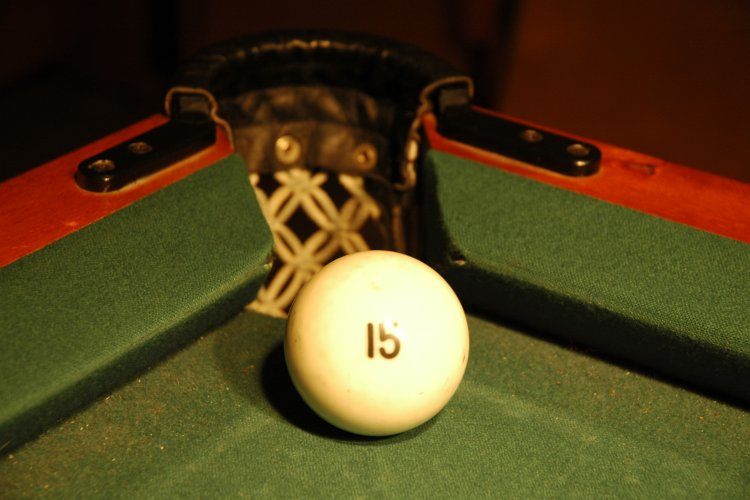
Russian pyramid ball at a corner pocket

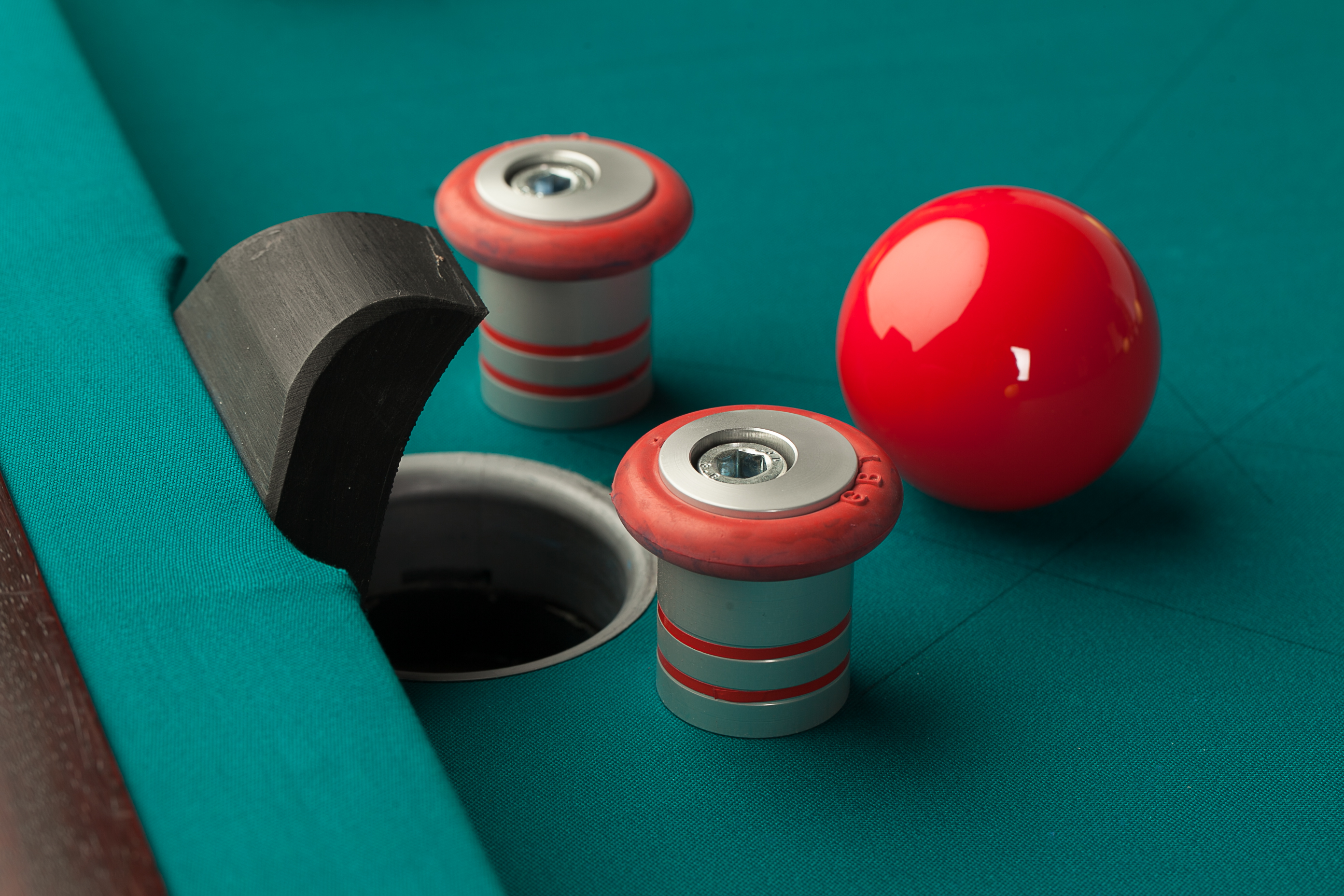
Bumper pool ball near a pocket

Various other games have their own variants of billiard balls.

Russian pyramid uses a set of fifteen numbered white balls and a maroon, red or yellow cue ball that are even larger than carom billiards balls at 68 millimetres (2 11/16 in). Kaisa has the same pocket and ball dimensions but uses only five balls: one yellow, two red and two white cue balls, one for each player.

Bumper pool requires four white and four red object balls, and two special balls, one red with a white circle and the other white with a red circle; all are usually 2 1/8 inches (54 mm) in diameter. Bar billiards uses six or seven white balls (depending on regional variations) and one red ball 1 7/8 in (48 mm) in diameter.

=== Novelty balls ===
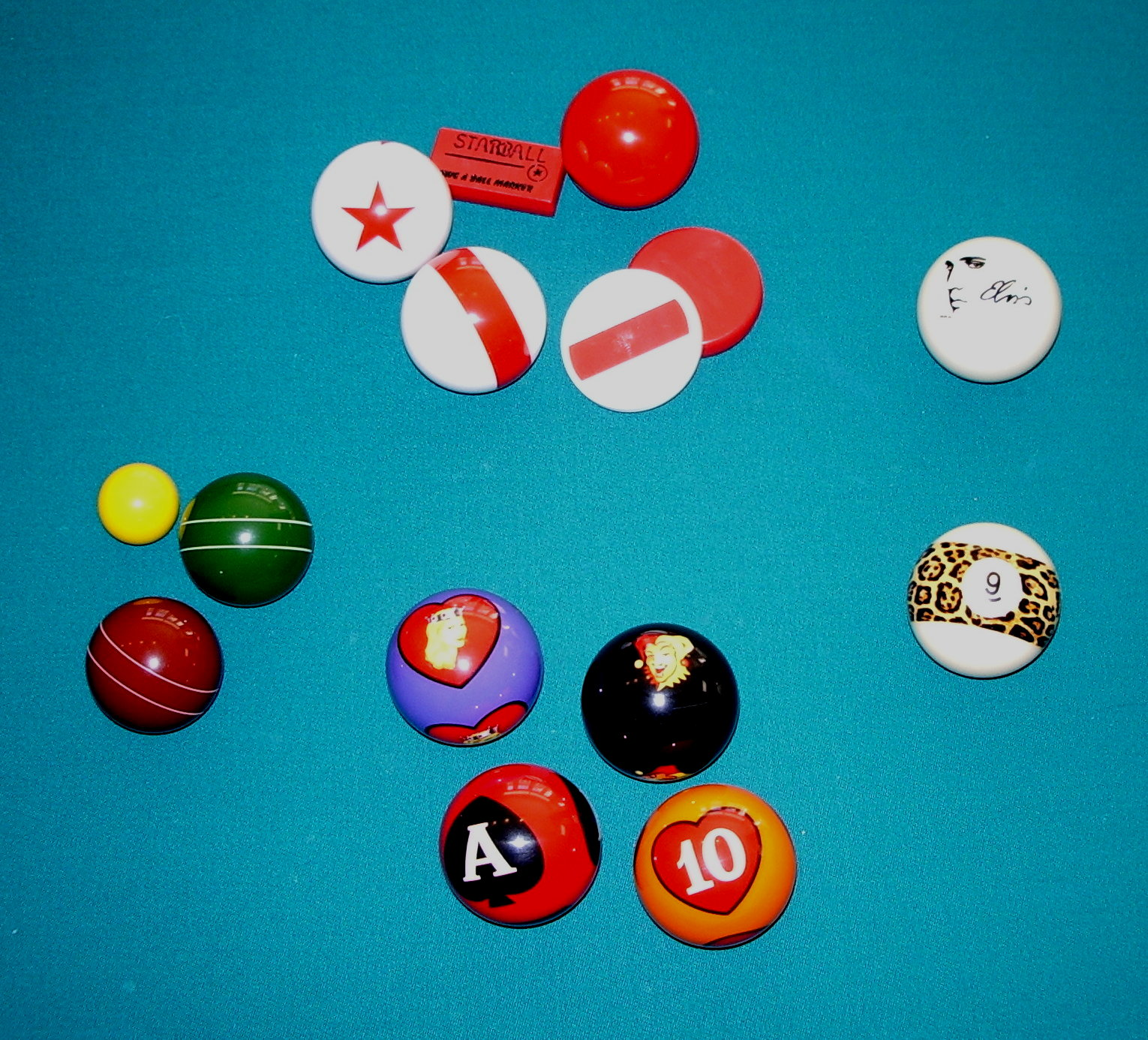
Various novelty billiard balls

There is a market for specialty cue balls and even entire ball sets, featuring sports team logos, cartoon characters, animal pelt patterns, or other non-standard decorations.

Entrepreneurial inventors also supply a variety of novelty billiard games with unique rules and balls, some with playing card markings, others with stars and stripes, and yet others in sets of more than thirty balls in several suits. Marbled-looking and glittery materials are also popular for home tables. There are even blacklight sets for playing in near-dark. There are also practical joke cue and 8 balls, with off-center weights in them that make their paths curve and wobble. Miniature sets in various sizes (typically 2/3 or 1/2 of normal size) are also commonly available, primarily intended for undersized toy tables. Even an egg-shaped ball has been patented and marketed under such names as Bobble Ball and Tag Ball.

== In popular culture ==
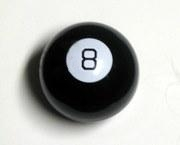
A Magic 8 Ball

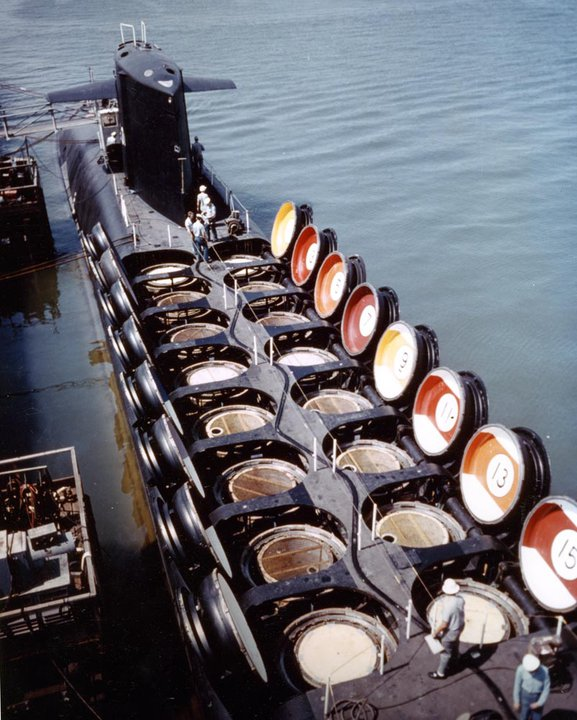
Ballistic missile submarine USS Sam Rayburn displays a billiard motif on her missile hatches

The 8 ball is frequently used in Western, especially American, culture as an element of T-shirt designs, album covers and names, tattoos, household goods like paperweights and cigarette lighters, belt buckles, etc. A classic toy is the Magic 8 Ball "oracle".

The term "8-ball" is also slang both for 1/8 ounce (3.5 g) of cocaine or crystal meth, and for a bottle of Olde English 800 malt liquor. It has also been used to refer to African-Americans, particularly those of darker skin tones, as in the films Show Boat and Full Metal Jacket. The expression "behind the eight [ball]" is used to indicate a dilemma from which it is difficult to extricate oneself. The term derives from the game kelly pool.

Because the collisions between billiard balls are nearly elastic, and the balls roll on a surface that produces low rolling friction, their behavior is often used to illustrate Newton's laws of motion. Idealized, frictionless billiard balls are a staple of mathematical theorems and physics models, and figure in dynamical billiards, scattering theory, Lissajous knots, billiard ball computing, and reversible cellular automata, Polchinski's paradox, contact dynamics, collision detection, the illumination problem, atomic ultracooling, quantum mirages, and elsewhere in these fields.

"Billiard balls" or "pool balls" is the name given to balls used in stage magic tricks, especially the classic "multiplying billiard balls". Though derived from real billiard balls, today they are usually smaller, for easier manipulation and hiding, but not so small and light that they are difficult to juggle, as the magic and juggling disciplines have often overlapped since their successful combination by pioneers like Paul Vandy.

The phrase "as smooth as a billiard ball" is sometimes applied to describe a bald person, and the term "cue ball" is also slang for someone who sports a shaved head.
