= Comparison of cue sports =

Carom billiards and pool are two types of cue sports or billiards-family games, which as a general class are played with a stick called a cue which is used to strike billiard balls, moving them around a cloth-covered billiard table bounded by rubber cushions attached to the confining rails of the table.

Carom billiards (often simply called "billiards" in many varieties of non-British English) is a type of billiards in which the table is bounded completely by cushions, and in which (in most variants) three balls are used.

Pool, also called "pocket billiards", is a form of billiards usually equipped with sixteen balls (a cue ball and fifteen object balls), played on a pool table with six pockets built into the rails, splitting the cushions. The pockets (one at each corner, and one in the center of each long rail) provide targets (or in some cases, hazards) for the balls.

Some games do not fall into those two broad categories, most notably snooker, which, although using a table with pockets, is not part of the pool family of games, and English billiards, which features both carom and pocket scoring, and uses the same table as snooker.

Skill at one type of billiards is widely applicable to the other, but expertise usually requires at least a degree of specialization.

== Background ==
Cue sports evolved from ancient outdoor stick-and-ball games, generally referred to (retroactively) as "ground billiards", a game similar in various respects, and closely related to, modern croquet, golf and field hockey. Billiards has been a popular game since the 15th century.

Carom billiards was long the most popular type of billiards, and remains an important international sport. Carom games, especially three-cushion, are intensely popular in many parts of Europe, Asia and the Pacific, and Latin America. In former times, extremely complicated and difficult carom games such as 18.2 balkline were played in world championship matches by players whose skill at very fine manipulation of the balls in nurse shots was so great that the serious playing field often consisted of only 4 major players for decades at a time. The carom world opened up in the latter half of the 20th century and grew to its current level of much broader international competition with the rise of three-cushion billiards, which had more action, simpler rules and easier basic play, but more difficult true mastery due to the elimination of nurse shots. Along with snooker and perhaps nine-ball (see below), three-cushion is expected to become an Olympic sport within perhaps a decade.

Pocket tables are known from the earliest days of billiards, being adaptations of lawn holes and croquet-style hoops to the indoor version of the game. The most common modern pool game, eight-ball evolved beginning around 1900. Today, numbered stripes and solids are preferred in most of the world, though the British-style variant (known as blackball) uses simplified colours. Eight-ball, in one variant or another, is played world-wide, is a pastime of millions of amateur league players, and draws intense competition at professional and amateur tournaments using the standardized World Pool-Billiard Association rules. However, the most intense competition in pool is in the game nine-ball, which has been the professional game of choice since the 1970s, with the decline of straight pool (also known as 14.1 continuous). Nine-ball grew in popularity because of its speed, the increased role played by luck, and its suitability for television.

== Equipment ==
=== Balls ===
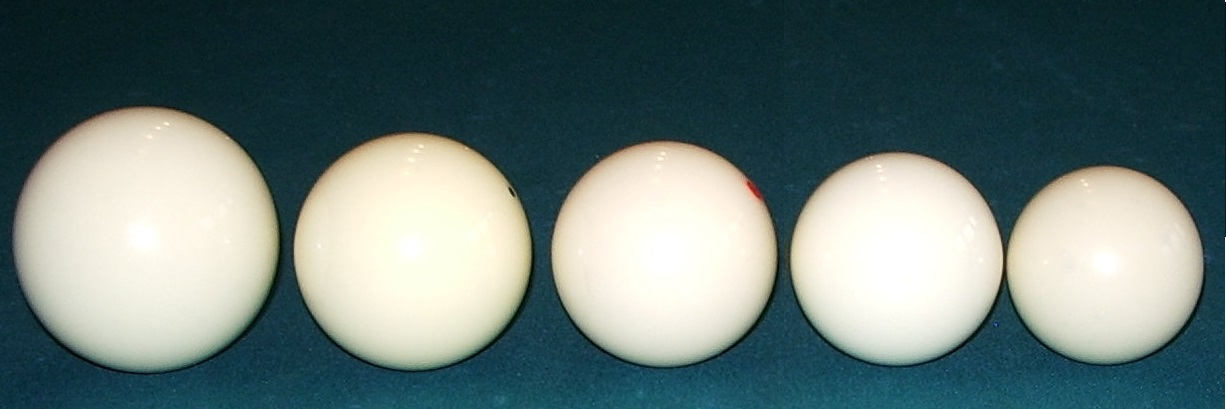
Comparison between Cue balls of each cue game from the biggest to the smallest (left to right): Russian pyramid and kaisa—68 mm (2 11/16 in); Carom—61.5 mm (2 7/16 in); Pool—57.15 mm (2 1/4 in); Snooker and English billiards—52.5 mm (2 1/16 in); British-style pool—51 mm (2 in)

Billiard balls vary from game to game, and area to area, in size, design and number. Though the dominant material in the making of quality balls was ivory until the late 1800s (with clay and wood being used for cheaper sets), there was a need to find a substitute for it, not only due to elephant endangerment, but also because of the high cost of the balls. This search led to the development of celluloid, the first industrial plastic, and balls have been made of various plastic compounds ever since, from materials such as bakelite, to modern-day phenolic resin, polyester and acrylic.

Carom billiards balls come most often as a set of two cue balls (one white and one yellow) and a red object ball. Carom balls are 61.5 millimetres (2.42 in) in diameter and weigh the same, between 205–220 grams (7.2–7.8 oz).

Internationally standardized pool balls come in sets of 16, including two suits or groups of numbered object balls, seven solids (1–7) and seven stripes (9–15), a black 8 ball and a white cue ball. Standard pool balls are 2.25 inches (57 mm) in diameter and are 6 ounces (170 g) in weight. Some coin-operated tables use a slightly different sized cue ball to allow for the cue ball to be separated by ball-return mechanisms, while others use magnetic or optical ball separators. "Casino-style" balls, commonly used in Britain and other countries where the blackball variant is more common, come in unnumbered suits of reds and yellows. Casino-style balls are often smaller at 2 inches (51 mm), and may feature a smaller, lighter cue ball.

The games of snooker and English billiards use balls smaller than those used in both pool and carom, with all balls measuring 52.5 millimetres (2.07 in) in diameter. In addition, six of the object balls used in snooker are uniquely coloured and have specific point values.

The games of Russian pyramid and kaisa, which are basically the Russian versions of the 8 ball and the carom games, use bigger balls than those of the other cue games, with all balls measuring 68 millimetres (2.7 in) in diameter. In addition, the main difference between the Russian pyramid balls and the regular pool balls are the colors; the numbered balls are colorless, while the cue ball is usually dark red. Furthermore, while the carom game uses 3 balls, (1 cue ball, 1 red ball and 1 yellow ball), the kaisa game uses 5 balls (2 cue balls, 2 red balls and 1 yellow ball).

The game of Blackball, which is basically the British version of the 8 ball game, uses smaller balls than those of the other cue games, with all balls measuring 51 millimetres (2.0 in) in diameter, only slitely than the snooker and English billiards balls. In addition, the game uses red and yellow clear balls instead of numbered clear and striped balls with multiple colors, with only the black 8 ball remaining the same.

=== Tables ===
There are many sizes and styles of billiard tables. With the exception of some variants of bumper pool, and some novelty tables, all billiard tables are rectangles that are twice as long as they are wide. Quality tables have a multi-slab slate bed over which the cloth (baize) is stretched. Less-rigid materials are prone to game-affecting changes due to humidity, and even permanent warping, as well as other problems.

The international standard for carom billiard tables is a playing surface (measured from rail cushion to rail cushion) of 2.84 by 1.42 m (112 by 56 in, or 9.32 by 4.66 ft), +/- 5 mm, though many (especially American) tables for amateur use are 10 x 5 ft (3 by 1.5 m). The slate beds of profession-grade carom tables are usually heated to stave off moisture and provide a consistent playing surface.

Most pool tables are known as 7-, 8- or 9-footers, referring to the nominal length of the playing surface's long side. The internationally standardised size for professional play is 9 by 4.5 ft (274 by 137 cm). In former times, 10 by 5 ft (3 by 1.5 m) and even 12 by 6 ft (3.7 by 1.8 m) tables were common, but today these are used only for snooker, the carom-pocket hybrid known as English billiards, and some other regional variants, such as Russian pyramid and Finnish kaisa. Ten-foot pool tables mostly date from the early 20th century or earlier, but can occasionally still be found in older pool halls. Pool tables as small as 6 by 3 ft. are available for homes and cramped public spaces, but are not commonly preferred. Pool table beds are usually not heated.

Snooker tables use smaller pockets compared to pool tables and rounded cushions at the pocket openings.

=== Cloth ===
The beds and cushions of all kinds of billiard-type tables (carom, pool, and snooker) are covered with a tightly-woven cloth called baize, generally of worsted wool, although wool-nylon blends are common and some 100% synthetics are in use. Baize is principally a Commonwealth term, with "cloth" being preferred in North American English. It is often erroneously referred to as "felt", which is not woven. Faster-playing 100% woolen cloth is most commonly used on home tables and in high-end pool halls. The cloth plays faster because it is smoother, thinner, more tightly-woven, and less fuzzy, providing less friction, thus allowing the balls to roll farther across the table bed. Billiard cloth has traditionally been green for centuries, representing the grass of the ancestral lawn game. Some have theorised that the colour may serve a useful function, as (non-colour-blind) humans supposedly have a higher sensitivity to green than to any other colour. However, no known studies have demonstrated any noticeable effect of cloth colour on professional or amateur play. Today, billiard cloth is available in a wide array of colours, with red, blue, grey, and burgundy being very common choices. In recent years, cloth with dyed designs has become available, like sports, university, beer, motorcycle and tournament sponsor logos.

There is no core difference between carom and pool cloth. Serious players of both types of cue sports generally prefer fast cloth, as it requires less force when shooting, allowing a more accurate and "finessed" stroke, and better ability to control cue ball speed and thus "shape" or position. Rebound angles off of cushions are also more accurate with faster cloth, and a tighter, thinner cloth retains less moisture. The principal difference is that the vast majority of pool tables encountered by the general public (i.e. in taverns and average pool halls) have cloth that is considerably thicker, coarser and slower, with the result that average recreational players have little understanding of the finer points of the effects of fast cloth on the game, and tend to shoot too hard when playing on better-equipped tables.

Snooker cloth, on the other hand, has a notable directional nap (except on most US-based tables, which use napless cloth), and compensating for the effect of this nap on ball speed and trajectory is an important element in mastery of the game.

=== Racks ===
Carom billiards games generally do not make use of ball racks. Depending upon the specific game in question, the balls may be released randomly, or set in very specific positions at the beginning of the game.

In most pool games, the object balls are tightly racked (placed within a usually wooden or plastic ball rack and moved into position) at a specific location on the table (which can vary from game to game). In internationally standardized games such as nine-ball and eight-ball, the apex ball of the rack (the ball furthest from the racker, pointing toward the end of the table from which the break shot will be taken) is placed on the foot spot, a spot that is at the intersection of the lateral middle of the racking end of the table, known as the foot string, and the table's longitudinal center, known as the long string); the game-winning "money ball" is in the center of the rack. In many games there may also be other racking requirements, such as the 1 ball at the apex. In some regional versions, the money ball must go on the foot spot. Some pool games, such as Chicago, are not racked at all, but as in many carom games have specific spotting locations for the balls. Snooker makes use of both tactics, with the pack of 15 red balls being racked much as in pool, and the special colour balls each having certain spots assigned to each.

There are two main types of racks; the more common triangular type which is used in eight-ball, fifteen-ball, straight pool and many other games, and a diamond-shaped one, is used in nine-ball. Special hexagonal racks are available for seven-ball, but the diamond rack can actually be used, sideways, for racking this game.

=== Cues ===
All cue sports (with the exception of cueless offshoots known as finger billiards and hand pool) are played with a stick known as a cue stick, or simply cue. A cue may be either a one-piece tapered stick, or a two-piece cue that screws together. The butt end of the cue is of larger circumference and is intended to be gripped by the player's shooting hand, while the cue shaft is narrower, usually tapering to a 10 to 15 mm (0.4 to 0.6 in) rigid terminus called a ferrule, where a leather tip is affixed to make final contact with balls. Cues can be made of different varieties of wood depending upon the cost factor. Traditionally hand-crafted cues are often spliced with various decorative hardwoods like cocobolo, and further decorated with inlays of attractive or valuable materials such as silver, mother of pearl, or semi-precious stones. Some are designed with modern materials (e.g. fiberglass or graphite carbon fibre reinforcements) and techniques (including vibration damping) in ways similar to high-end golf clubs.

There are various cue aids. Chalk, which comes in hard, dyed, paper-wrapped cubes, must be periodically applied to the tip of the cue during every game to prevent miscuing, especially when attempting to impart spin to the ball. "Chalk" is not actually chalk (calcium carbonate) at all, but a mixture of silica and aluminium oxide. The mechanical bridge, also known as rest or bridge stick, is a cue-like stick with a head on it upon which the cue can be rested in a groove or crook; this is used to give support to the cue in shots not reachable by or too awkward for the bridge hand. A tip tool or scuffer is an abbraisive or micro-puncturing hand-held tool that is used to prevent the tip from becoming too hard and smooth from repeated cue ball impacts to properly hold chalk. Hand talc or a pool glove may be used on the bridge hand to keep the stroke smooth; this is very helpful in humid environments.

Carom billiard cues are typically shorter, at usually 54 to 57 in (137 to 145 cm), than pool and snooker cues, which average 57 to 59 in (145 to 150 cm), but the exact dimensions are a matter of player preference. Carom cue ferrules and tips are most often 11 to 12 mm in diameter, versus a butt diameter of 32 33mm, while pool tips average around 12.5 to 13.5 mm (butt 31 to 32 mm), with snooker tips at typically 9.5 to 10.5 mm (butt 30 to 31 mm). Many skilled pool players prefer to shoot with a snooker-sized tip, but few professionals do so, including the former snooker pros who have long dominated women's nine-ball. Cue weight is another factor that varies more as a matter of player preference. Non-custom carom cues available from most makers range from 17 to 20–oz, with the average being about 17.5–oz. Stock pool cues are available sometimes from 15 to 22 oz, though few serious players use anything, and many manufactures provide nothing, outside the 18 to 20–oz range, and the most common weight is 19 oz. Snooker cues are often graded as simply "light" (17 to 18 oz) or "heavy" (19 to 20 oz).

Carom cues most often have a ferrule of brass, although phenolic resin and fiberglass are becoming more common. Pool cues usually have a ferrule of phenolic resin or fiberglass, although metal was formerly very common. Most snooker cues have a brass ferrule. Personal carom and pool cues are both typically jointed at the half-way point in the piece, while snooker cues most commonly are around two-thirds shaft and one third butt, requiring a longer carrying case. Carom cues usually have a wood-to-wood joint, with a delicate threaded wooden pin, on the principle that this produces a better feel and weight balance, while pool cues often have a metal joint and pin, since pool games tend to involve considerably more force, necessitating reinforcement. Snooker cues usually have a sunken metal joint, providing both strength and wood-to-wood contact. Carom and snooker cues are more often hand-made, and are more costly on average than pool cues, since the market for mass-produced cues is only particularly strong in the pool segment. High-end hand-made, but non-custom carom and snooker cues are largely products of Europe and Asia, while their pool counterparts are mostly North American products. The bulk of machine-made cues are sold by American brands, but are outsourced from non-US labour pools. In the extreme carom discipline known as artistic billiards, a master practitioner may have 20 or more cues, of a wide range of specifications, each customised for performing a particular shot or trick.

== Goals ==
The aim of virtually all carom billiards games is to amass a predetermined point score (25, 50, 1000, etc.) before the opponent does so, or amass a greater score than the opponent within a predetermined amount of time. In most such games, one successful shot earns one point, with no penalty for a miss, but some games, such as Italian five-pins, provide various different scoring and fouling opportunities.

Some pool games work on the principle of a point per ball up to a pre-set score (14.1 continuous or straight pool, for example), while others have point-scoring systems based on the number shown on the ball, lowest-score wins systems, or last-man-standing rules. The most popular pool games today, however, are "money-ball" games, in which a specific ball must be pocketed under particular conditions in order to win. The most popular pool game in the world (but unfortunately the one with the least consistent rules from area to area) is eight-ball, where each player attempts to pocket a particular suit (group) of balls, and then finally the 8 ball. In nine-ball and its variant seven-ball, there are no suits, and each player must always shoot the lowest-numbered ball on the table first, and either attempt to eliminate all of them in turn to pocket the namesake money ball on the last shot, or use the lowest-numbered ball in some way to pocket the money ball early. A game increasingly popular among professionals is ten-ball, which is played with the same core rules, except that (in the internationally standardized version) the 10 ball cannot be pocketed early for an easy win.

Some games combine aspects of both carom and pocket billiards. English billiards is played with balls identical in size to snooker balls (2.0625" in diameter), and visually similar to carom balls on a snooker table, and there are various ways to earn different amounts of points. Russian pyramid is played with even larger balls (68mm in diameter), pockets barely large enough to admit them (corner pockets at 72mm, side pockets at 82mm), and the goal of pocketing the cue ball by caroming it off of numbered object balls into a pocket to earn the point value of the numbered balls struck, depending on the rules used. Snooker is played by amassing points for pocketing balls with specific values, and losing points for various fouls.

== Rules ==
The World Pool-Billiard Association in concert with the Union Mondiale de Billard (UMB) and various other governing bodies have established worldwide rules for a number of carom billiards games, including three-cushion, straight rail and five-pins. While there are, of course, locally popular games of various sorts that differ from region to region, the main games in the carom field are totally standardised.

In the realm of pool, there are many associations which have issued rules for the various games over the years. Eight-ball in particular is a thorny issue. WPA and its regional and national affiliates like the Billiard Congress of America (BCA), professional tournament series like the International Pool Tour (IPT), and amateur leagues like the Valley National Eight-ball Association (VNEA, which despite its name is multi-national) and the American Poolplayers Association/Canadian Poolplayers Association (APA/CPA) all have different rulesets. By far, most professional pool play uses the WPA/BCA rules, and while some progress has been made moving league rules toward the WPA standard, some such as the APA/CPA have wildly diverging rulesets for eight-ball. Meanwhile, millions of individuals play informally using colloquial rules which vary not only from area to area, but even from venue to venue. Nine-ball, on the other hand, has been the paramount gambling and tournament pool game for several decades, and has globally almost completely been standardised on the same rules in both professional and amateur play. Snooker and English Billiards have also long since been completely standardised (however, there is a version known as American snooker that has simplified rules).
