= Crud =

Crud or CRUD may refer to:

- Waste, dirt, faeces, or something of poor quality
- Create, read, update and delete (CRUD), basic functions of a computer database
- Crud (game), a game played on a billiard table
- CRUD (radio station), a former radio station of Rochdale College in Toronto, Canada
- Crud (band), an American rock band
- "Crud", a song by British rapper Ghetts from his 2021 album Conflict of Interest
- Crud (radioactive waste), corrosion particles that become radioactive.
