= Cribbage (pool) =

Two-player pool game

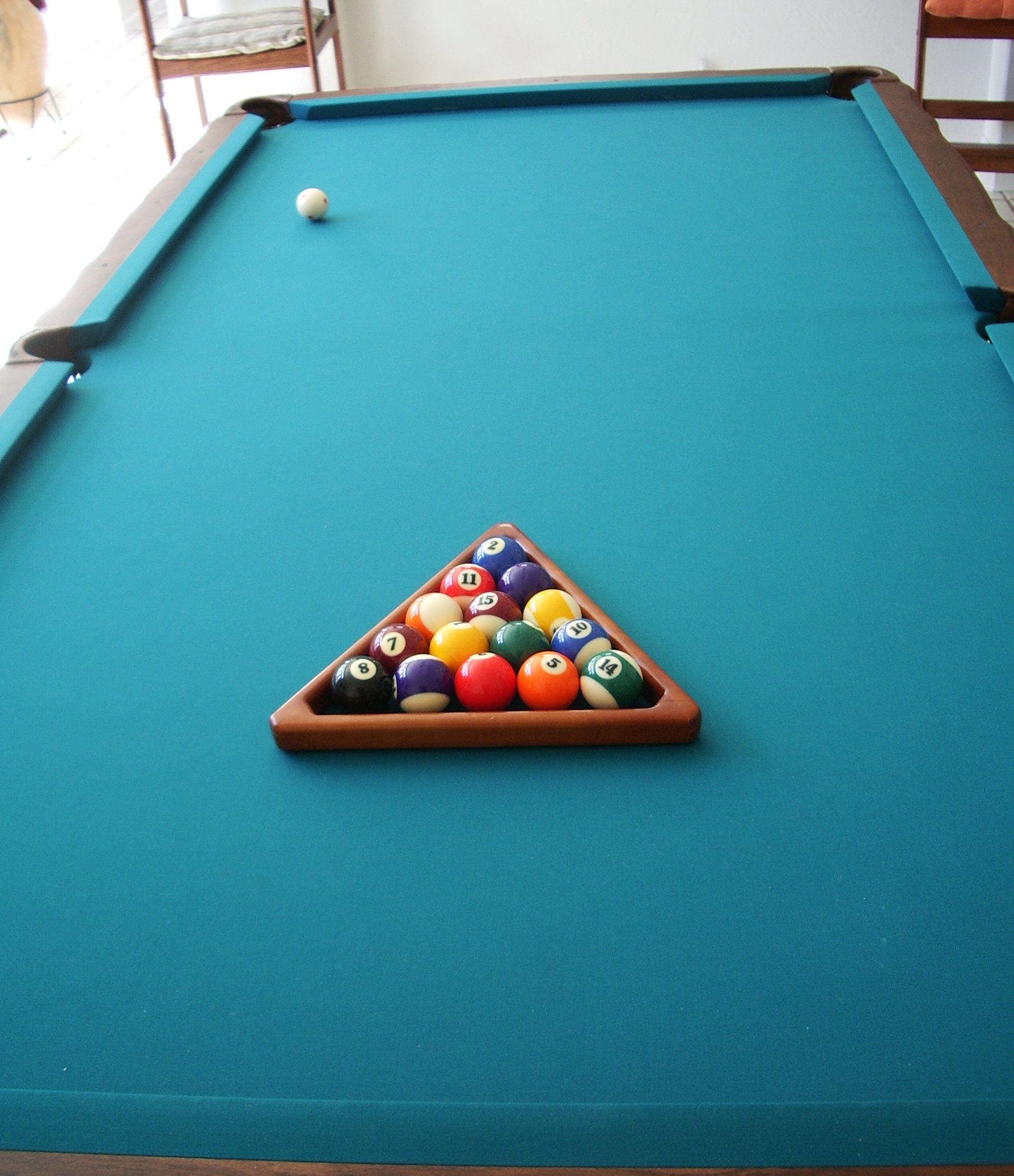
Setting up a game of cribbage with the triangle rack.

Cribbage, sometimes called cribbage pool, fifteen points and pair pool, is a two-player game that, like its namesake card game, has a scoring system which awards points for pairing groups of balls (rather than playing cards) that total 15. Played on a standard pool table, participants who pocket a ball of a particular number are required to immediately pocket the companion ball that tallies to 15 when added to the prior ball's number. Each pair so pocketed counts as a cribbage; there are seven such pairs, and the 15 ball counts as an eighth by itself after all of the others have been pocketed. The first player to score five cribbages wins the game.

== Gameplay ==
=== Setup ===
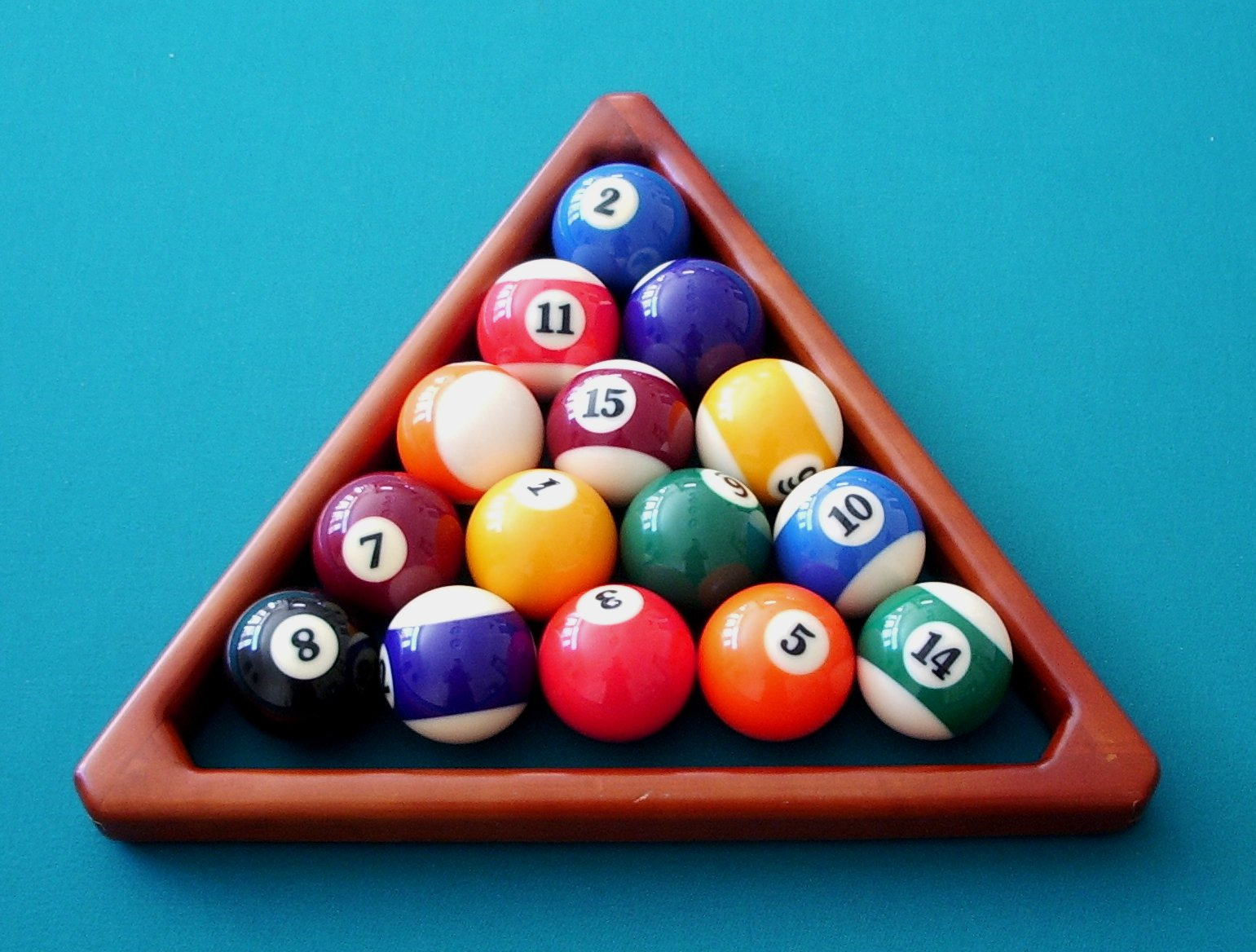
A cribbage rack: The 15 in the middle, apex ball on the foot spot, and no two corner balls adding up to fifteen.

At the start of cribbage, a standard set of fifteen pool balls are racked at the foot end of a pool table, with the apex ball of the rack centered over the foot spot and the 15 ball placed at the rack's center. All other balls are placed randomly except that no two of the three corner balls may total to fifteen. Such an open-ended racking rule is unusual in that most pool games require particular balls to be placed at the corners of the rack and sometimes in fixed positions inside the rack as well. The arrangement thus results in 134,120,448,000 possible racking patterns (14 × 12 × 10 × 2 × 11!).

An open break is required in cribbage, meaning that on the break either a ball must be pocketed or at least four balls must be driven to rails (as opposed to a safety break). The object of the game is to score 5 cribbages out of a possible 8 in a full rack of 15 balls.

=== Cribbages ===
A cribbage is a pair of numbered balls which, when added together, total 15. A cribbage only lies where the two partner balls forming the cribbage are each legally potted, i.e., where no foul is committed on the same strokes that pocket the balls, or the shot is otherwise deemed illegal. The one exception to pairing is the 15-ball, which itself becomes a cribbage but only once all other object balls have been pocketed.

=== Rules of play ===
A cribbage only counts when the paired balls are pocketed in succession in the same inning. When a player first pockets a ball, it is described as on a cribbage. If, on the next stroke, the companion ball is not pocketed, the shot is a foul and the unpaired ball is spotted to the foot spot. If the foot spot is occupied, balls are spotted as close as possible to the foot spot on the long string stretching back from the foot spot to the foot rail.

The penalty for all fouls is the ending of the player's inning; no points are lost, and the incoming player has the option of shooting from position or taking cue ball in hand from the kitchen (behind the table's head string). In older rules a foul was a loss of one point. Three successive fouls in cribbage is a loss of game. Pocketing the 15-ball when it is not the last ball on the table is not a foul. Instead it is immediately spotted and play continues without penalty.

When a player pockets more than one ball on a single stroke at any time, a situation often arising on the break shot, they may shoot at any companion balls, but must pocket each in succession in any order. If incidental balls are pocketed on the same stroke that a cribbage is completed, they add to the succession of cribbages the player is "on". When a player fouls by failing to pocket an unpaired cribbage while on a succession of unpaired balls, only unpaired balls are spotted; the prior successful cribbages count toward the score.

Normal ball and rail foul rules apply in cribbage. This is a requirement present in most pool games that a player must contact an object ball with the cue ball and after that contact, either pocket an object ball, or some ball including the cue ball must contact a rail. When a foul results from a scratch, where the cue ball is played into a pocket or jumping it off the table, the opposing player has cue ball in hand from the kitchen. When a player has cue ball in hand from the kitchen and all object balls are also behind the head string in the kitchen, a player has the option of having the object ball nearest the head string relocated to the foot spot. If in this situation two or more object balls are equidistantly closest to the head string, the player may designate which ball is to be relocated.
