= Sinuca brasileira =

Brazilian variant of snooker

The layout of balls in sinuca brasileira

Sinuca brasileira (Portuguese for Brazilian snooker), often simply called sinuca, is a cue sport played on a snooker table, using only one red ball instead of snooker's fifteen, with the normal seven colours of the standard set of snooker balls. Each ball carries the same basic point value as in snooker. As with other pocket billiards games, a white cue ball is used to pot the red and other coloured balls. The game is played almost exclusively in Brazil and is little known outside this region.

== Rules ==
Ball values are the same as in standard snooker (red = 1, yellow = 2, green = 3, brown = 4, blue = 5, pink = 6, black = 7) and points are awarded to a player after the corresponding ball is legally potted.

The colours are set up on their normal spots as in snooker, while the sole red ball is placed halfway between the pink ball and the right side cushion. The cue ball is placed in the "D". The opening player may move the ball anywhere within the "D" before playing. The first shot must be played so that the red ball is contacted; however, it is not permitted to either pocket the red ball or leave the opponent snookered. The opponent then has choice of shot.

Taken in turns, each player has a choice to either take a free shot (shoot for the ball on the table with the lowest point value) or a penalty shot (shoot for any other ball). All shots are called, that is the player must indicate which ball they wish to pot and which pocket they are aiming for.

If a free shot is made, the player is awarded the ball's point value, the ball remains off the table, and the player can choose any remaining ball on the table as a second free shot; if that ball is made, the player receives its point value and the ball is respotted. The player now once again has the choice of either a free shot or a penalty shot. A miss on a free shot incurs no penalty, but does end the player's turn.

If a penalty shot is chosen, and the shot is made, the player is awarded the ball's point value and the ball is respotted. The player then has to play a free shot. If a penalty shot is missed, it constitutes a foul and the opponent is awarded 7 points. If an in-off foul (where the cue ball is accidentally potted) occurs, the incoming opponent will get the points and receive ball-in-hand, permitting placement of the cue ball anywhere within the "D" before their next shot.

All other rules are the same as in snooker, although plants, cannons and other combination shots are automatically illegal because all the balls are different colours.

The maximum break in sinuca is 112. This is achieved by scoring as many penalty shots and second free shots as possible with the black ball when all object balls are present.
