= Baseball pocket billiards =

Pool (billiards) game with elements borrowed from baseball

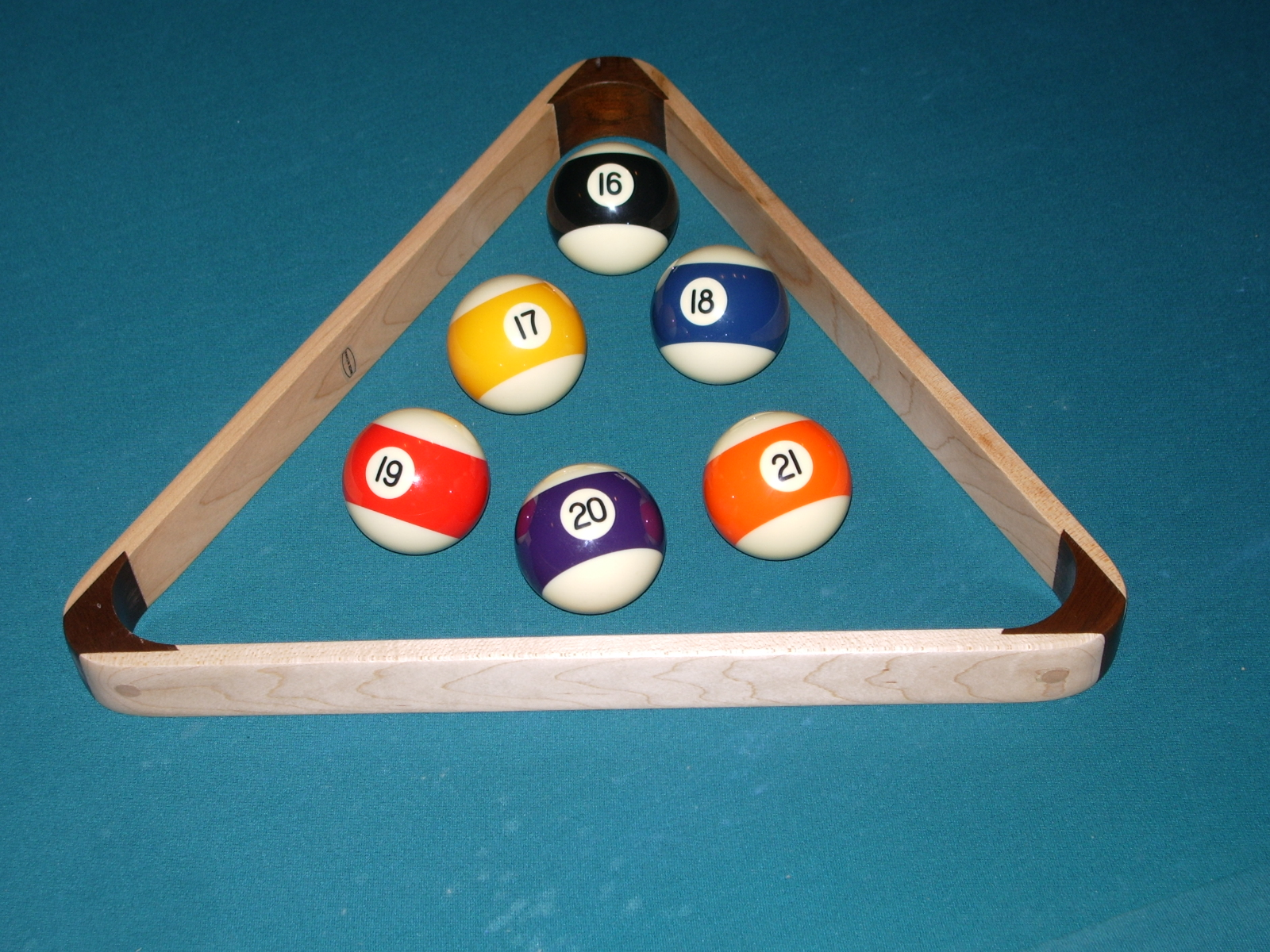
The extra balls of baseball pocket billiards in a rack.

Baseball pocket billiards or baseball pool (sometimes, in context, referred to simply as baseball) is a pocket billiards (pool) that is loosely based on the game of baseball. The game is played on a standard pool table and suitable for multiple players. In baseball pocket billiards, many of the game's features are named after baseball terms, such as the 9 ball being named the "pitcher", the table's foot spot is "home plate", and each team or player is afforded "nine innings" to score as many "runs" as possible.

The game dates back to at least 1912, when Brunswick soberly described it in a pamphlet as "the most fascinating game of the twentieth century." The winner of a game is the player with the highest run tally after all players have taken nine turns "at bat".

== Gameplay ==
=== Set-up ===
16	black stripe
17	yellow stripe
18	blue stripe
19	red stripe
20	purple stripe
21	orange stripe

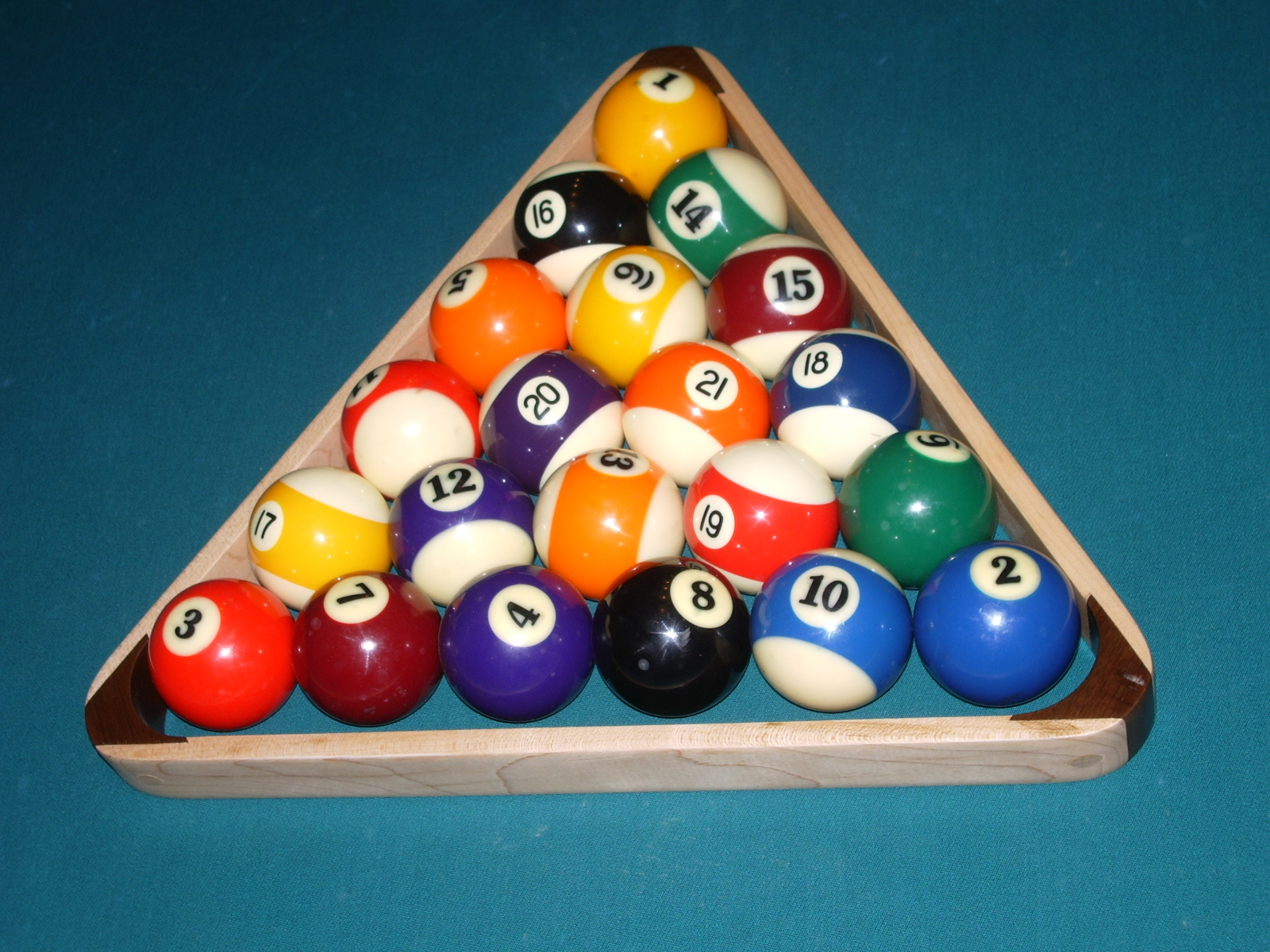
Full setup

Baseball pocket billiards is played with 21 numbered object balls. Sets of balls numbered 16 through 21, known as "baseball sets", to be used in conjunction with a standard 15-ball pool set, have been marketed specifically for the game, along with the oversized triangle racks needed for proper racking. The balls are racked at the foot end of a pool table, with the apex ball of the triangle centered over the foot spot ("home plate").

Viewed from the racker's vantage point, the 1 ball is placed at the triangle's apex, the 2 ball at the right corner, and the 3 ball at the left corner, similar to that of rotation. The 9 ball, called the "pitcher", is placed at what would be the center of the rack if the game were to be played with 10 balls. All other balls are placed randomly. Because most physical racks only accommodate 15 balls, the last row of balls may be placed manually after placement with a standard triangle. The opening break and subsequent breaks, if any, are performed with the cue ball in hand from the kitchen (behind the table's head string).

=== Object of the game ===
Baseball pocket billiards is a call-shot game, meaning a player must call the ball to be hit and the intended pocket on all shots but for the break. Any incidental balls pocketed on a successful called shot count in the player's favor but must be spotted to home plate if unsuccessful. Each player is allowed nine innings at the table, played in succession, in which to score as many runs as possible. The game ends when all players have completed their rounds. The winner is the player with the most runs after all have finished their turn "at bat".

=== Scoring ===
Each legally pocketed ball garners the shooter the numerical face value of the ball. For example, pocketing the 2 and 15 balls during an inning results in a score of 17 runs for that visit. Scores must be contemporaneously recorded on a score sheet with the total tally for each inning marked. If a player pockets all 21 balls before his inning allotment ends, the balls are re-racked and play continues, with a re-break from the kitchen. Each inning continues until a player misses a ball or commits a foul.

=== Penalty for fouls ===
The penalty for a foul is a loss of turn, no score for the ball or balls pocketed on the fouled stroke, as well as no score for the immediately preceding pocketed ball during any inning. This means that if a player did not legally pocket a ball on the stroke preceding the foul, the last ball pocketed in the last scoring inning is spotted and subtracted from that prior inning's score. All balls pocketed on a fouled stroke are spotted to home plate. If the player has not yet made any balls at the time of the foul, the first subsequent ball pocketed is spotted at the inning's conclusion and does not count toward the player's score.
