= Kaisa (cue sport) =

Type of cue sport in Finland

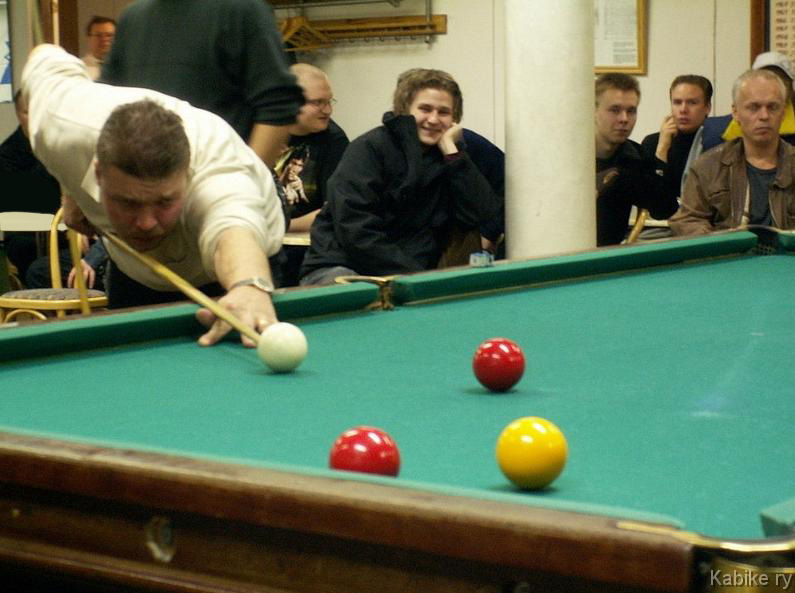
Kaisa, corner pocket.

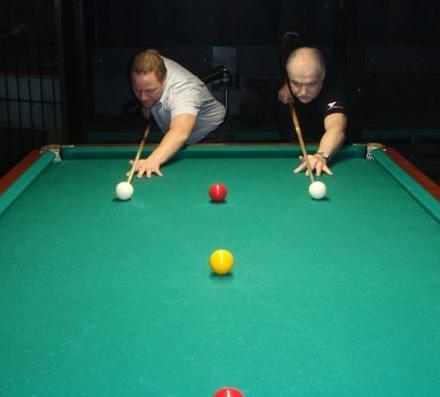
The lag

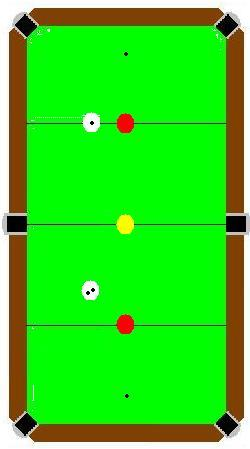
Common starting position

Kaisa or karoliina is a cue sport mainly played in Finland. The game originated in Russia, where it is still played to some extent. Kaisa equipment is similar to Russian pyramid from the 68 mm (2 11/16 in) balls, small pockets barely large enough for a ball to enter, and the long and heavy cue sticks. Kaisa tables are usually 10 feet long, and thus 2 feet shorter than official tournament Russian pyramid tables, which are 12 feet long. It is a two-player or two-team game. As with many carom billiards games, both players have their own cue balls used to shoot at the other balls, and usually differentiated by one cue ball having a dot or other marking on it. In all, five balls are used: the yellow object ball (called the kaisa in Finnish), two red object balls, and the two white cue balls (each of which serves as an object ball for the opponent). The game is played to 60 points, in a rather elaborate scoring system, reminiscent of those used in snooker and English billiards, with points being awarded for various types of shots. Like both Russian and English billiards, which are also played on large pocket billiards tables, kaisa is a hybrid of carom and pocket billiards game styles. Kaisa is principally a recreational game, without professional players. However, the first kaisa world championship tournament was held in April 2010. Participants came from 33 countries, and the main tournament was held in Kotka. A Finnish player, Marko Rautiainen, won the championship title.

== Origins ==
Kaisa can be traced back to an 18th-century game called Russian carambole played with two white cue balls and one red object ball. By the beginning of the 19th century, a new variant added two more object balls: a blue ball and a black, brown, or yellow ball called the karolin, caroline, or carline which gave the game its name.

== Rules ==
The players lag to decide who will be the first shooter; the player who wins the lag begins the game. The object balls are positioned at their spots, and the cue ball of the winner of the lag is placed behind the head string, while the lag-loser's cue ball is placed somewhere between the foot (top) string and center string, but cannot obstruct the first player being able to shoot the yellow kaisa toward the corner pocket diagonally opposite the corner pocket closest to the first player's cue ball. At the start of the game (or with ball-in-hand after an opponent's foul), the player cannot shoot an object ball directly to a side (centre) pocket., though this shot is legal at any other time.

All shots must be called in detail. In most call-shot games, nominating the object ball and the intended pocket is sufficient, but in kaisa the shooter must also call any kisses on other balls or cushion contacts on the path of the object ball to the pocket. After pocketing of the called object ball, any carom on or pocketing of another object ball for additional points (see below) need not be called.

The same player continues shooting after each successful shot, but yields the table to the next player after failing to earn points on a shot attempt. All pocketed balls are spotted before the next shot is taken, except the opponent's cue ball, which remains pocketed until the end of the current shooter's visit. Balls moved but not pocketed remain where they lie. The incoming player shoots from where that player's cue ball lies if it remains on the table, or has ball-in-hand behind the head string if that cue ball was pocketed by the previous player.

=== Scoring ===
Points are acquired by pocketing (potting) the object balls with the cue ball, with additional points being available for additional feats. The game ends when one player earns 60 or more points.

Basic shots:

- Pocketing the opponent's white ball = 2 points
- Pocketing a red ball = 3 points
- Pocketing the yellow ball (kaisa) = 6 points

Additional points are awarded for caroming the cue ball to object balls (in any order) on the same shot, providing that the initial object ball was pocketed. This kind of carom is called nakki in Finnish (which translates to "vienna sausage" or "hot dog" in English). A kiss shot – causing an object ball to hit another object ball – does not award points.

In scoring nakki shots, the caromed balls are scored as in a basic shot (white is 2 points, each red is 3 points, yellow is 6 points), but the effective point value of the pocketed ball changes (white is effectively 1 point, each red is still 3 points, yellow is effectively 9 points). The result is the following nakki shot values:

- Pocketing opponent's white plus a carom (nakki) with a red = 4 points
- Pocketing opponent's white plus caroms with both reds = 7 points
- Pocketing opponent's white plus a carom with the yellow = 7 points
- Pocketing opponent's white plus caroms with the yellow and a red = 10 points
- Pocketing opponent's white plus caroms with the yellow and both reds = 13 points
- Pocketing a red plus a carom with opponent's white = 5 points
- Pocketing a red plus a carom with the other red = 6 points
- Pocketing a red plus a caroms with the other red and opponent's white = 8 points
- Pocketing a red plus a carom with the yellow = 9 points
- Pocketing a red plus a carom with the yellow and opponent's white = 11 points
- Pocketing a red plus caroms with the yellow and the other red = 12 points
- Pocketing a red plus caroms with the yellow, the other red and opponent's white = 14 points
- Pocketing the yellow plus a carom with opponent's white = 11 points
- Pocketing the yellow plus a carom with a red = 12 points
- Pocketing the yellow plus caroms with opponent's white and a red = 14
- Pocketing the yellow plus caroms with both reds = 15 points
- Pocketing the yellow plus caroms with the opponent's white and both reds = 17 points

A special 12-point shot is pocketing the yellow kaisa cross-side (yli keskelle in Finnish) as the first-struck object ball. It does not matter which ball hit the cushion first, the cue ball (a kick shot) or the kaisa (a bank shot). This adds an additional 6 points to the shot's value, which otherwise accumulates like a regular object-ball pocketing shot:

- Pocketing the yellow cross-side plus a carom with opponent's white = 17 points
- Pocketing the yellow cross-side plus a carom with a red = 18 points
- Pocketing the yellow cross-side plus caroms with opponent's white and a red = 20 points
- Pocketing the yellow cross-side plus caroms with both reds = 21 points
- Pocketing the yellow cross-side plus caroms with opponent's white and both reds = 23 points

Additionally, the player gets still more points if a ball with which the cue ball caromed for additional points (i.e. a nakki ball) is also pocketed on the same shot. The number of points is awarded by the pocketed ball's value: white = 2, red = 3, yellow = 6. For example, if a player pockets the yellow kaisa, and caroms a red nakki ball into a pocket, the score is 15 points (kaisa pocketed for 6, nakki carom off pocketed kaisa for 3, red hit on nakki carom for 3, plus red ball in a pocket for 3, equals 15).

=== Fouls ===
If a player scratches his/her cue ball into a pocket or off the table, the player's points are reduced according to which ball the cue ball hit first (e.g. a scratch off the yellow kaisa deducts 6 points). If no ball is hit before the scratch, the penalty is simply 2 points.

Fouls result in ball-in-hand for the incoming player.
