= John Thurston (inventor) =

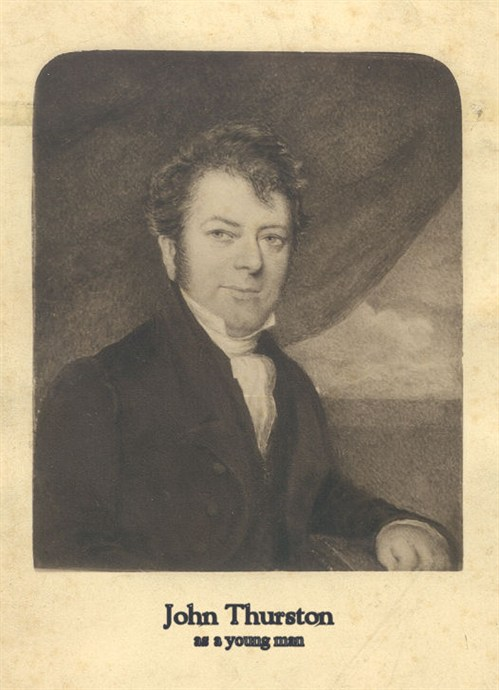

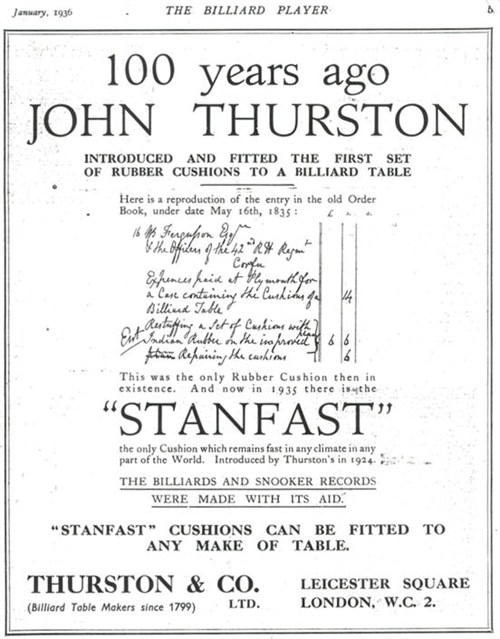
Advertisement commemorating the introduction of the rubber cushion in 1835

John Thurston (1777–1850) was an inventor who developed the use of slate beds and rubber cushions for billiard tables. He was dubbed "the father of the billiards trade."

In 1799, he founded a business to make billiard tables as well as general cabinet making. The company, Thurston & Co. Ltd, continues in business.

== See also ==
Thurston's Hall
