= Seven-ball =

Rotation pool game

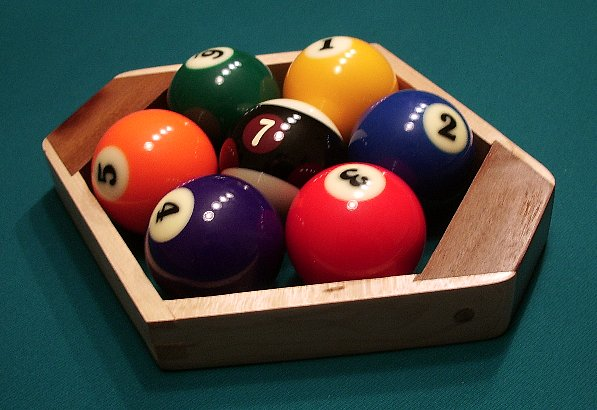
Seven-ball rack showing specially designed 7 ball.

Seven-ball is a rotation pool game with rules similar to nine-ball, though it differs in two key ways: the game uses only seven object balls as implied by its name, and play is restricted to particular pockets of the table. William D. Clayton is credited with the game's invention in the early 1980s.

== Rules ==
At the start of the game, balls one through seven are racked in a hexagonal configuration, with the 1-ball placed at the rack's apex, centered over the table's foot spot, the 7-ball placed at the rack's center, and all other balls placed clockwise (see photo top right). Immediately following the break shot, the opponent must elect three pockets along one of the table's long rails, and the player who broke is automatically assigned the three pockets situated along the opposite long rail. Once that selection is made, balls 1–6 may be pocketed in any pocket in rotation, starting with the one, as the object ball. Balls pocketed via combinations off of the object ball are legal. The 7-ball must be pocketed in player's assigned side to be a legal win. Scratches on any object ball allow the opponent ball-in-hand, but the sunk ball remains potted. Scratching on the 7-ball is a loss. Pocketing the 7-ball in any other pocket than one on the called side is a loss.

A special 7-ball was designed for television matches by Charles Ursitti (billiards historian, referee and Willie Mosconi's one time manager) to more easily distinguish the 7-ball from the 3 on television. The ball adopts the stripe of the 9-ball with the color of the solid black 8-ball, the "money balls" of their respective namesake games.

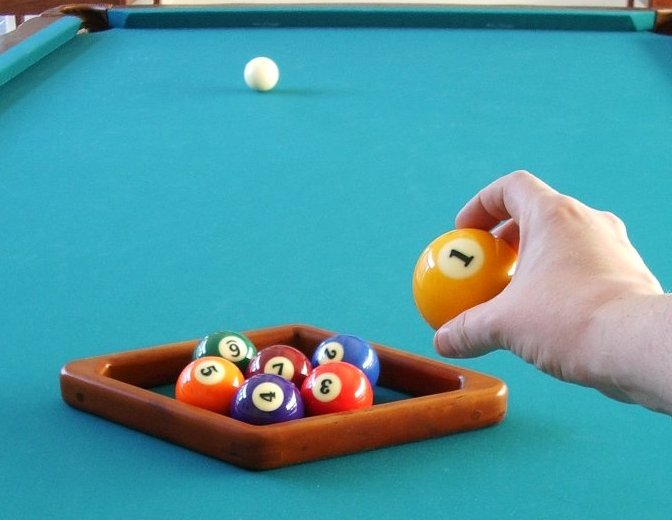
Racking up a game with the diamond rack and a regular 7 ball

No special equipment is required for play; a regular set of pool balls and a nine-ball diamond rack turned sidewise are adequate.

The original informal incarnation of seven-ball led to a variant professional ruleset that enjoyed a brief heyday in the series Sudden Death Seven-ball, broadcast on the American cable TV network ESPN from 2000 to 2005.
