= Four-ball billiards =

Carom billiards game played in variations around the world

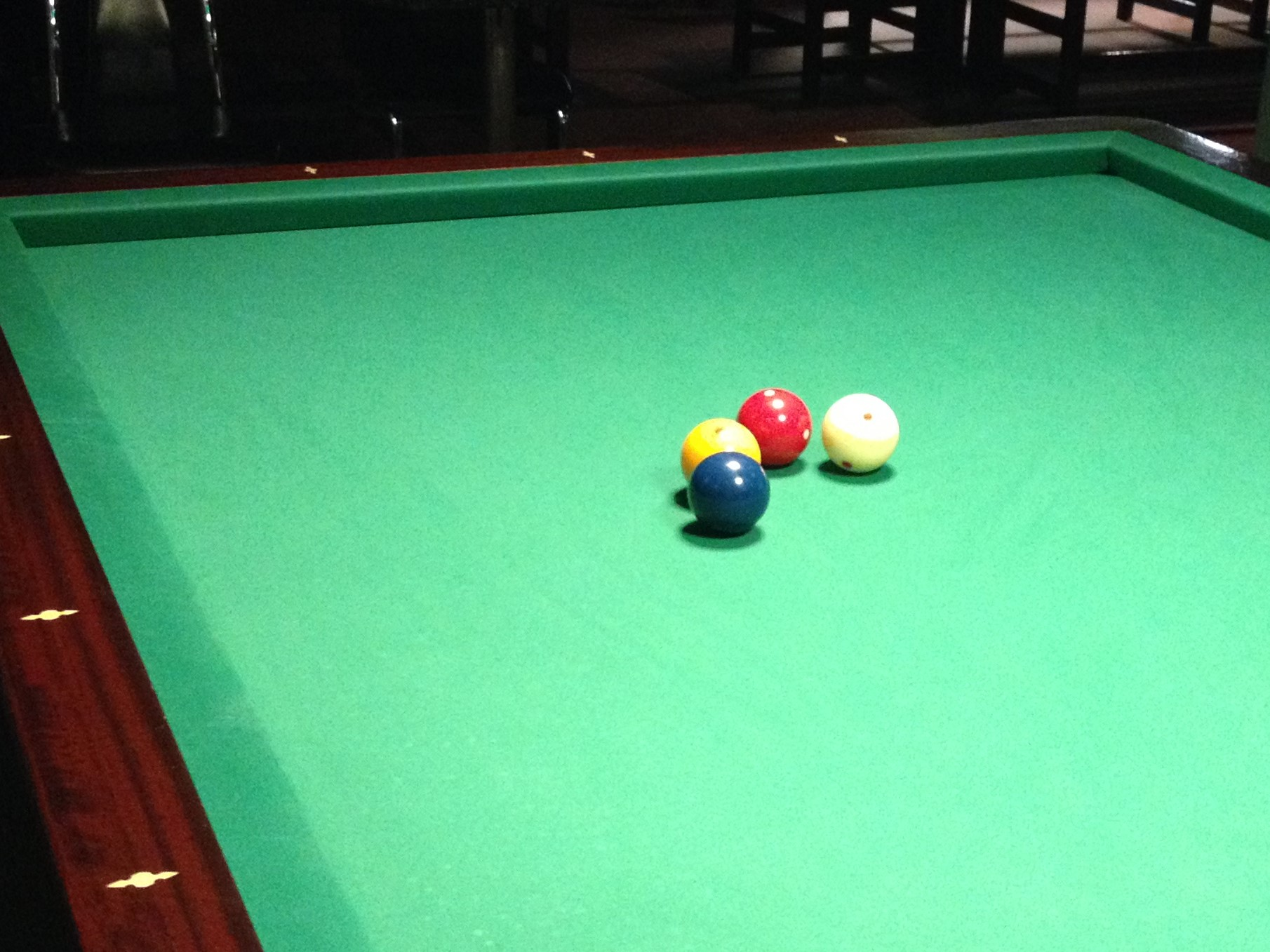
Four-ball billiards

Four-ball billiards or four-ball carom (often abbreviated to simply four-ball, and sometimes spelled 4-ball or fourball) is a carom billiards game, played on a pocketless table with four billiard balls, usually one white ball, one yellow ball, and two red balls (or one red and one blue ball). Each player is assigned one of the white or yellow balls as a cue ball. A point is scored when a shooter's cue ball caroms on any two other balls in the same shot (with the opponent's cue ball serving as an object ball, along with the red (and blue, if used) balls. Two points are scored when the shooter caroms on each of the three object balls in a single shot. A carom on only one ball results in no points, and ends the shooter's inning.

== Asian variations ==
Yotsudama being played in Sakhalin c. 1924

A variant of four-ball is the East Asian game yotsudama (四つ玉, Japanese for 'four balls'), or sagu (四球, 사구, Korean for 'four balls').

The game is played with two red object balls, one white cue ball and one yellow cue ball (or sometimes both cue balls are white, one having a red spot). Each of the two players is assigned a white or yellow cue ball; whether the opponent can use it as an object ball is a difference between the Japanese and Korean versions. A point is scored when the shooter caroms on two balls. A carom on only one ball results in no points, and ends the shooter's inning.

There are a few differences between the Korean and the Japanese variants:

- Starting position: In the Korean version, the cue ball is placed beside one of the red object balls for the opening shot, and play commences by hitting the red ball on the opposite side of the table (as in three-cushion billiards). In the Japanese version, the cue ball is placed behind the second red object ball, and play commences by hitting the red object ball nearest to the cue ball.
- Object balls: In the Korean version, a player is penalized a point if the cue ball caroms off the opponent's cue ball. In the Japanese version, doing so is legal, as the opponent's cue ball is available as an object ball; caroming on all three balls scores two points.
- Winning: In the Korean version, after having scored the final point, a win is secured by doing a three-cushion shot; until one is successfully played, the player lagging behind can still catch up and win. In this respect, it is similar to the game play of the darts game cricket. In the Japanese version, the game is simply over when a player reaches the agreed-upon score.

== Central European variation ==
A variation of four-ball called desítkový karambol (Czech for 'tenfold carom') is popular in Central Europe, especially in the Czech Republic. It is played with white ball, a blue ball, a yellow ball and a red ball which serves as the cue ball for both players. Players score a point by hitting two of the other three balls with the cue ball. A carom off all three object balls in one shot, however, scores 10 points. The score is doubled by hitting a cushion before hitting any of the other balls for a total of either two or 20 points in one shot.
