= Bumper pool =

Cue sport

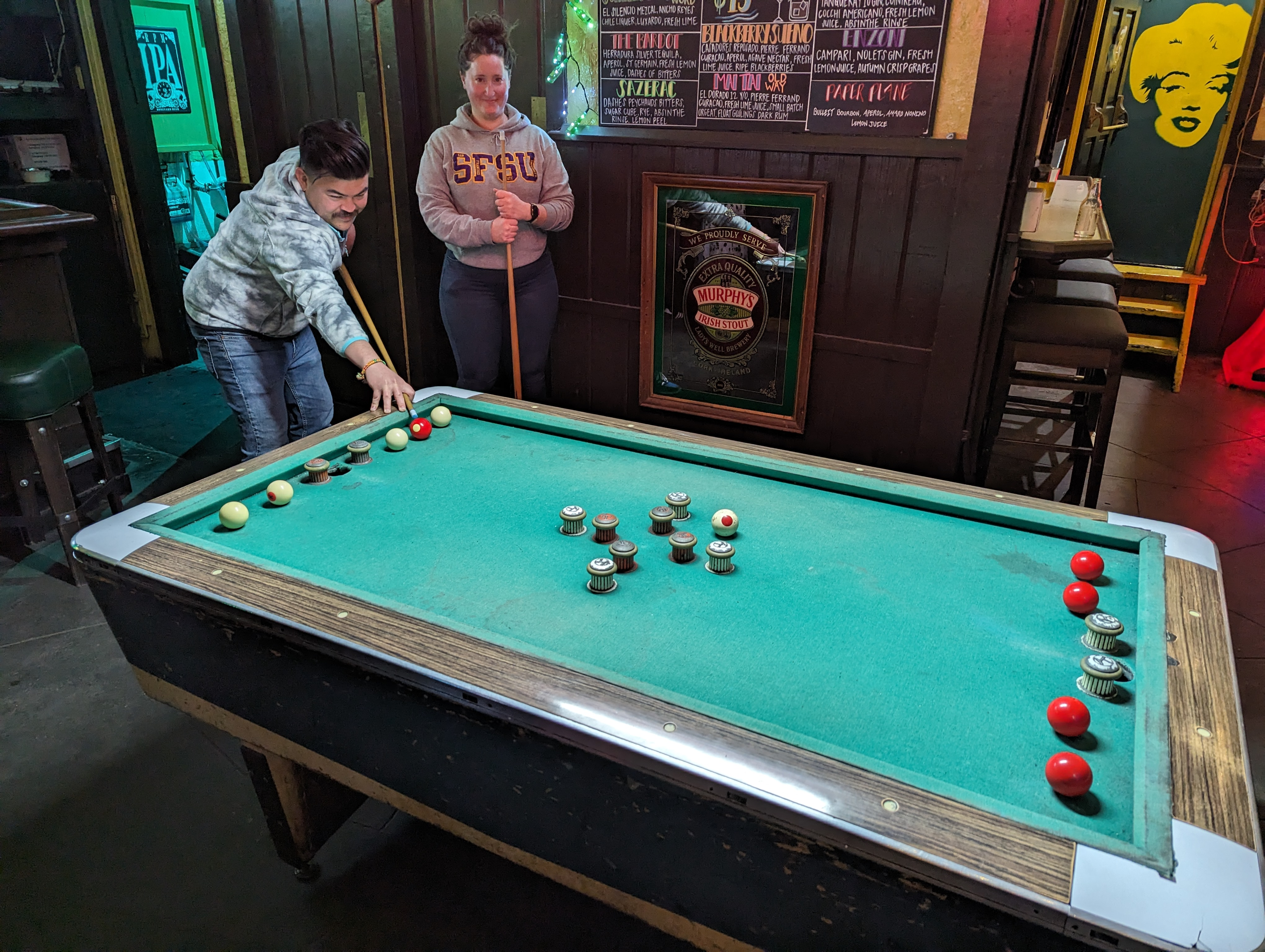
Rectangular bumper pool table

Bumper pool is a cue sport played on a rectangular (or sometimes octagonal) table fitted with two pockets and an array of fixed cushioned obstacles, called bumpers, within the interior of the table surface.

== Table ==
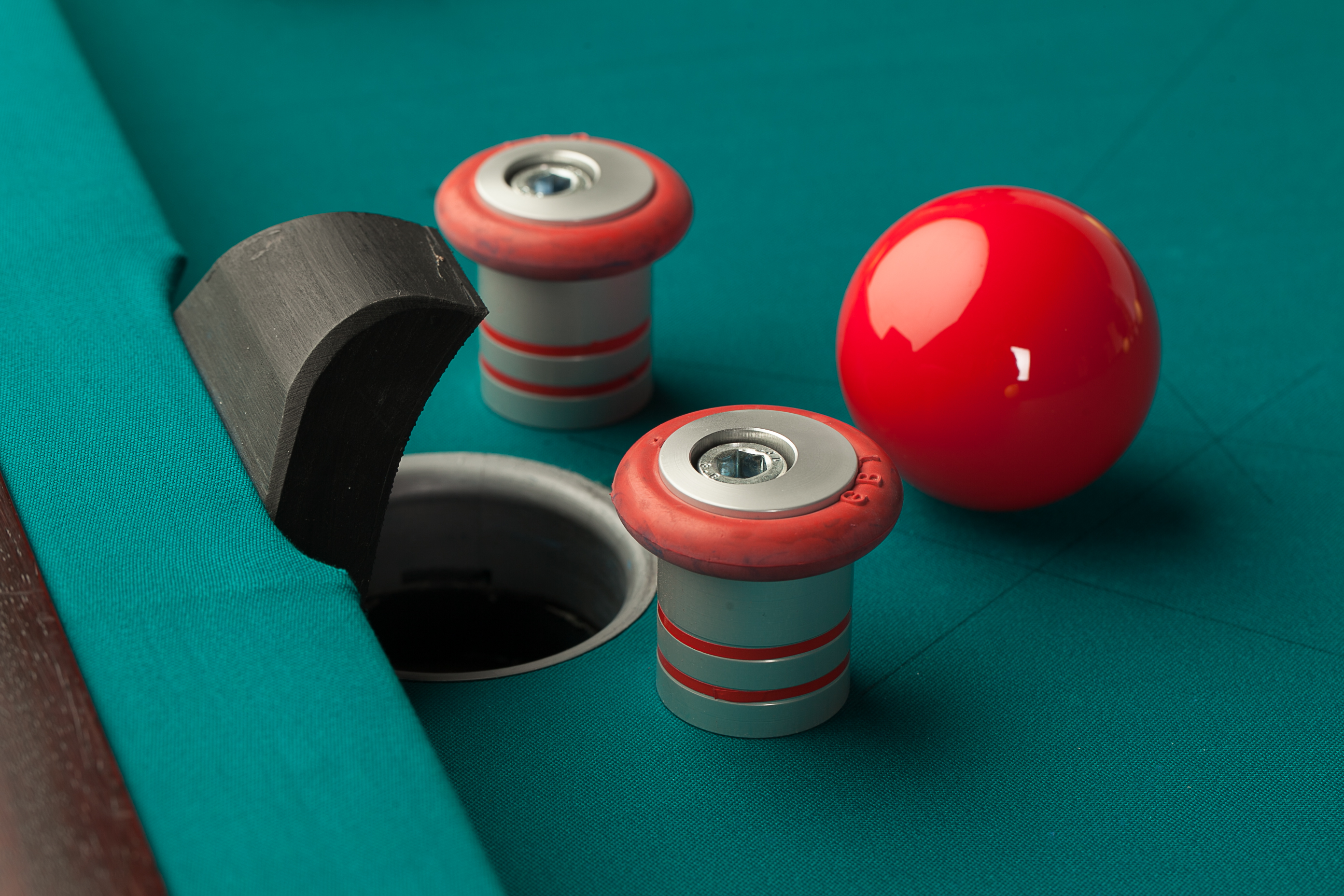
Ball near the bumpers and pocket.

Typically, bumper pool tables are smaller than a regulation pool table. The table has two pockets, placed opposite one another, located at the center of two of the rails. The surface of the table has the same cloth covering as a standard pool table.

Two bumpers flank each pocket. The remaining bumpers are arranged in a cross in the center of the table, with one line of the cross in line with the pockets. At the center of the cross, there is an open space just large enough to allow a ball to pass through. Most tables have eight bumpers in the cross, with two comprising each arm, though additional pairs of bumpers may be included in the cross.

== Gameplay ==
The game is played with 5 red and 5 white billiard balls, with one ball in each set marked by a circle of the other color. At the start of play, each set of balls is arranged on five spots near each edge of the table by a pocket with the marked ball placed directly in front of the pocket. The object is for a player to sink all of their balls into their pocket at the opposite end of the table. The player's marked ball must be sunk before the player can shoot any other balls. Unlike most other billiard games, there is no designated cue ball; any ball may be shot directly with the cue stick, including into a pocket, rather than the more common rule that a cue ball must be hit into the intended ball.

To begin play, both players shoot their marked ball simultaneously, banking the ball off the cushion to their right and attempting to sink their ball in their pocket at the other end of the table. If both players sink their first shot they each select another ball, place it in front of their opponent's pocket and repeat the simultaneous shot. If both players successfully sink all five of their balls in this fashion the game ends in a draw.

If, on the initial simultaneous shot, one player fails to sink their marked ball in the pocket, the player who successfully sank a ball or who came closest to their own pocket shoots next. A player's turn continues until they fail to sink a ball.

When a player sinks all five balls in the target pocket without interruption of their sequence of play, it is referred to as a 'perfect game'.

== Fouls ==
If a player sinks one of the opponent's balls there is no penalty. However, the ball is considered sunk regardless of which pocket it drops in. If a player sinks one of their own balls (but not the last) in the wrong pocket, the opponent may drop two of their own balls into their pocket. A player sinking their last ball in the wrong pocket loses the game. If a player causes a ball to leave the table, their opponent may place that ball anywhere on the table (usually in the middle space surrounded by bumpers) and may (depending on local custom) drop two of their balls into their pocket. Jump shots are not permitted in bumper pool.
