= Chicago (pool) =

Gambling game

Chicago is a "money ball" pool gambling game.

== Rules ==
"Chicago" often refers to a variation of rotation pool in which the balls are initially placed in positions against the rails of the table.

Another variation of Chicago is played in a similar fashion to nine-ball and rotation, where balls must be played in order starting with the 1 ball. In Chicago, all fifteen balls are used. The money balls are the 1, 5, 8, 10, 13 and 15. These six balls are racked to the front of the rack with the 1 ball at the head of the rack. A player continues his turn as long as a ball is pocketed. A score is kept as to how many money balls are made by each player.

Once all the balls are pocketed, the players will "settle up" based on the number of money balls they made during the game. The loser pays the winner a previously agreed-upon amount multiplied by the difference in money balls between the two players. For example, if Player A makes five money balls and Player B makes one, then Player B owes Player A four times the wagered amount.

The game can also simply be played recreationally for points instead of money.

Fouls: If a player does not hit the object ball it is considered a push. In the event of a push the incoming player has the option to either take the next shot or give it back to the person who pushed. If there are two fouls in a row, the incoming player gets ball in hand anywhere on the table. A scratch, i.e. pocketing the cue ball, results in ball in hand behind the headstring, and the incoming player must shoot at object balls forward of that line.

=== Informal rule variations ===
As well as the 1, 5, 8, 10, 13, and 15 balls being money balls (also called ways), the number value of each ball pocketed by a player is added up at the end of each game (i.e. 1 ball = 1 point, 12 ball = 12 points). The player(s) with at least 61 cumulative points, or a majority of points (the cumulative sum of all balls is 120) gets a seventh way, or point. This prevents the game from ending in a tie.

The game can be played by up to four players. The three- and four-player formats are team-based, and decided in the following way: 3 players: The player who pockets the 1 ball is solo for the duration of the game, and competes against the other two players, who are now teammates who shoot alternately against the first player. 4 players: The player who pockets the 1 ball remains alone until the lowest-numbered money ball is pocketed by another player, making those two players teammates. For example, if one player pockets the 1 ball, and another pockets the 5 ball, they become teammates, competing against players three and four, who are also now teammates. If a single player pockets the 1 and 5 balls, this player is partnered with the player who pockets the 8 ball. If the 1, 5 and 8 ball are pocketed by the one player, the 10 ball then becomes the pairing ball, and so on.

Special considerations: Roundhouse: This occurs if a player or team pockets all money balls on the table (1, 5, 8, 10, 13, 15). This results in double points being awarded to that individual or team (or twice the money per way). In this case, the 61 points rule for the seventh way does not apply. Squarehouse: This occurs if a player or team pockets all balls on the table, without an opponent pocketing a single ball. This results in quadruple points being awarded to that individual or team (or four times the money per way).

According to A Complete Hand-book of Standard Rules (1910), in Chicago Pool the lowest scorer "pays for the general refreshments", while the second-lowest scorer pays for the table.

== In popular culture ==
The pool hall Chicago Billiards in New Haven, Connecticut is named after the game.
