= Crud (game) =

Ball game played on snooker table

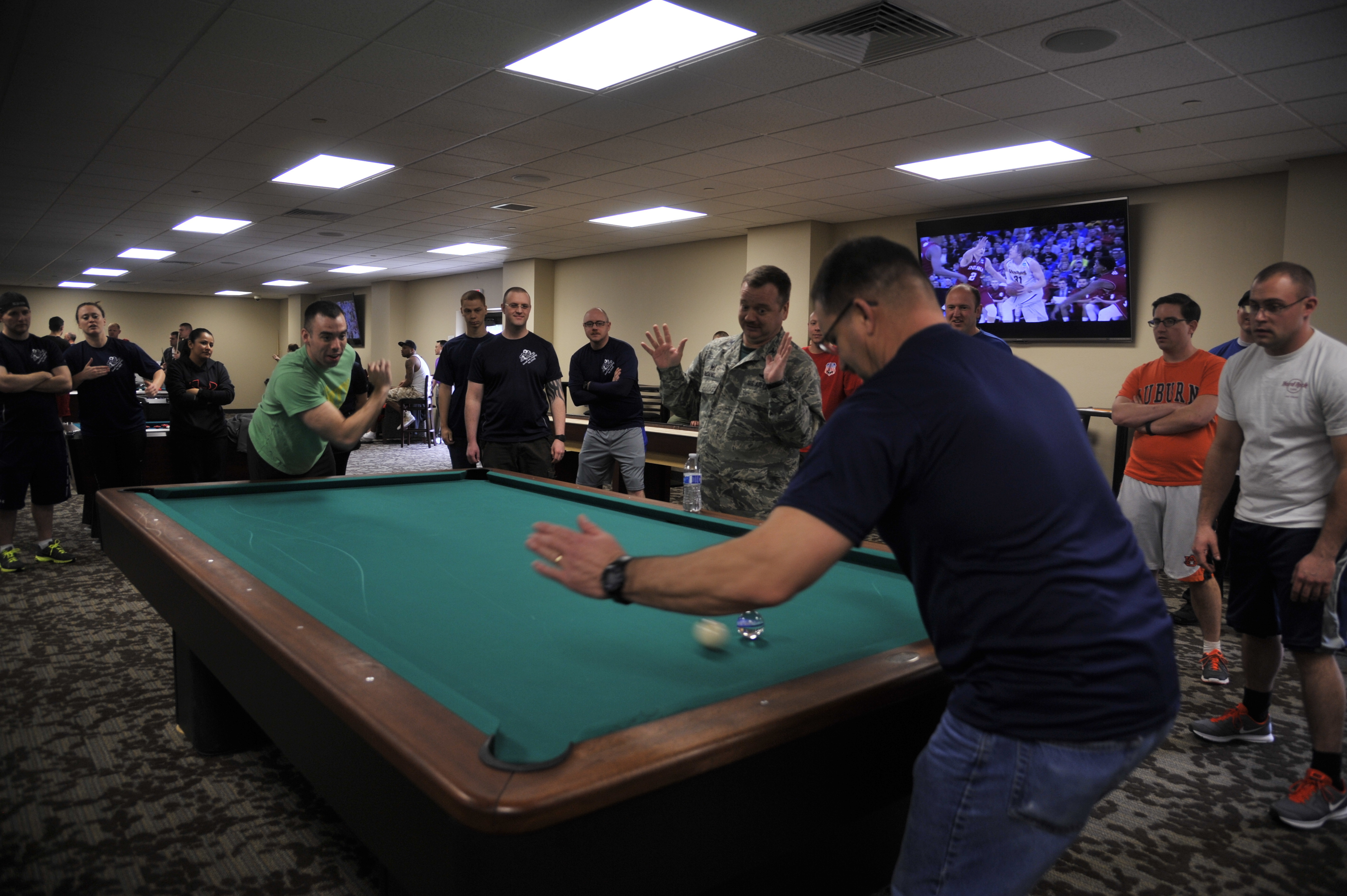
Game being played at Fairchild Air Force Base.

Crud is a fast-paced game played on a snooker table (or, if unavailable, a billiards table), usually on military bases in several countries. While the sport uses a billiards table and two balls, no cues are used.

The game's origins are not precisely known. An oft-repeated legend states that a group of Royal Canadian Air Force fighter pilots during World War II were waiting in Gander, Newfoundland, for their flights to the UK. While in Gander, the pilots were unable to play traditional pool on the tables there because all of the cues were broken, and so they invented a game that used the table, two balls, and no cues. The game spread and has become popular among members of the Canadian Armed Forces, the Canadian Coast Guard, the United States Air Force, the United States Navy, the United States Marine Corps, the Australian Army, and the Royal Australian Air Force.

== Rules ==
While the game of crud has a loose set of rules, variations of the game exist.

Crud is played with two balls, the "shooter" ball, typically the white cue ball, and the "object" ball, typically one of the striped balls, as it is visually easier to determine when a striped has stopped moving or spinning.

The game can be played 1-on-1, or with two opposing teams. During an attacking player's turn, they attempt to strike the object ball with the shooter and put the object ball into a pocket. Shots must be taken from the short end of the table. Each player begins with three lives.

Players can lose lives in various ways. If the object ball stops moving and spinning while a player is attempting to strike it, they lose a life. If the object ball is potted, the player on defense loses a life. Any violation of the rules, such as shooting from the long side or interfering with a shooter, can result in the loss of a life, subject to a ruling by a referee.

The game is over when all players but the winner have lost all their lives.

Normally, opposing players are not allowed to physically block the shooter or object balls, or touch or tackle opposing players. Under "combat rules", more contact is tolerated.
