= Rack (billiards) =

Containment rack in pocket billiards

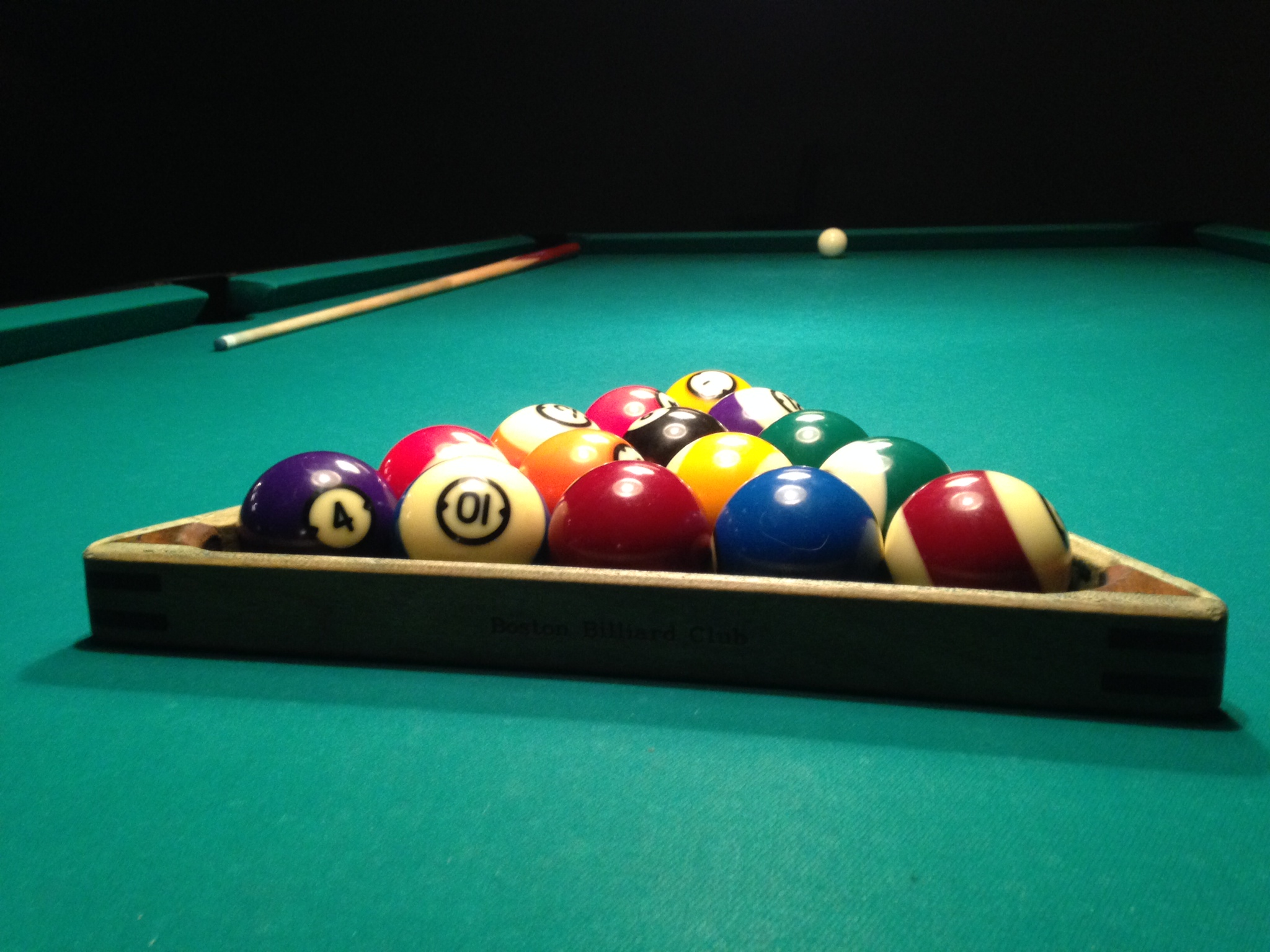
Billiard balls in a rack

A rack (sometimes called a triangle) is a piece of equipment that is used to place billiard balls in their starting positions at the beginning of a pocket billiards game. Rack may also be used as a verb to describe the act of setting billiard balls in their starting positions (e.g. "to rack the balls"), or as a noun to describe a set of balls that are in their starting positions (e.g. "a rack of balls", more often called a pack or a pyramid in British English).

Traditional racks are in the form of triangular frames, usually made from wood, plastic or metal. A modern variation, called a template rack, is made from a thin material (usually 0.14 mm or less) that contains precision cut-outs to hold the balls in place. Purported benefits of template racks include a more consistent racking, and their popularity has warranted specific inclusion in profession rules. Unlike traditional racks, template racks are left on the table during the break shot and removed at the players' earliest convenience. For this reason, template racks are almost never used for games where it is common to slow-break (i.e. not create a large spread of balls) since it is significantly more likely that the rack will interfere with slow-rolling balls.

The most common shape of a rack is that of an equilateral triangle. Triangular racks are used for eight-ball, straight pool, one-pocket, bank pool, snooker and many other games. Diamond-shaped frames are sometimes used for the game of nine-ball (although a triangular rack can also be used) and template racks come in a variety of shapes.

== Racking in specific billiards games ==
=== Eight-ball ===
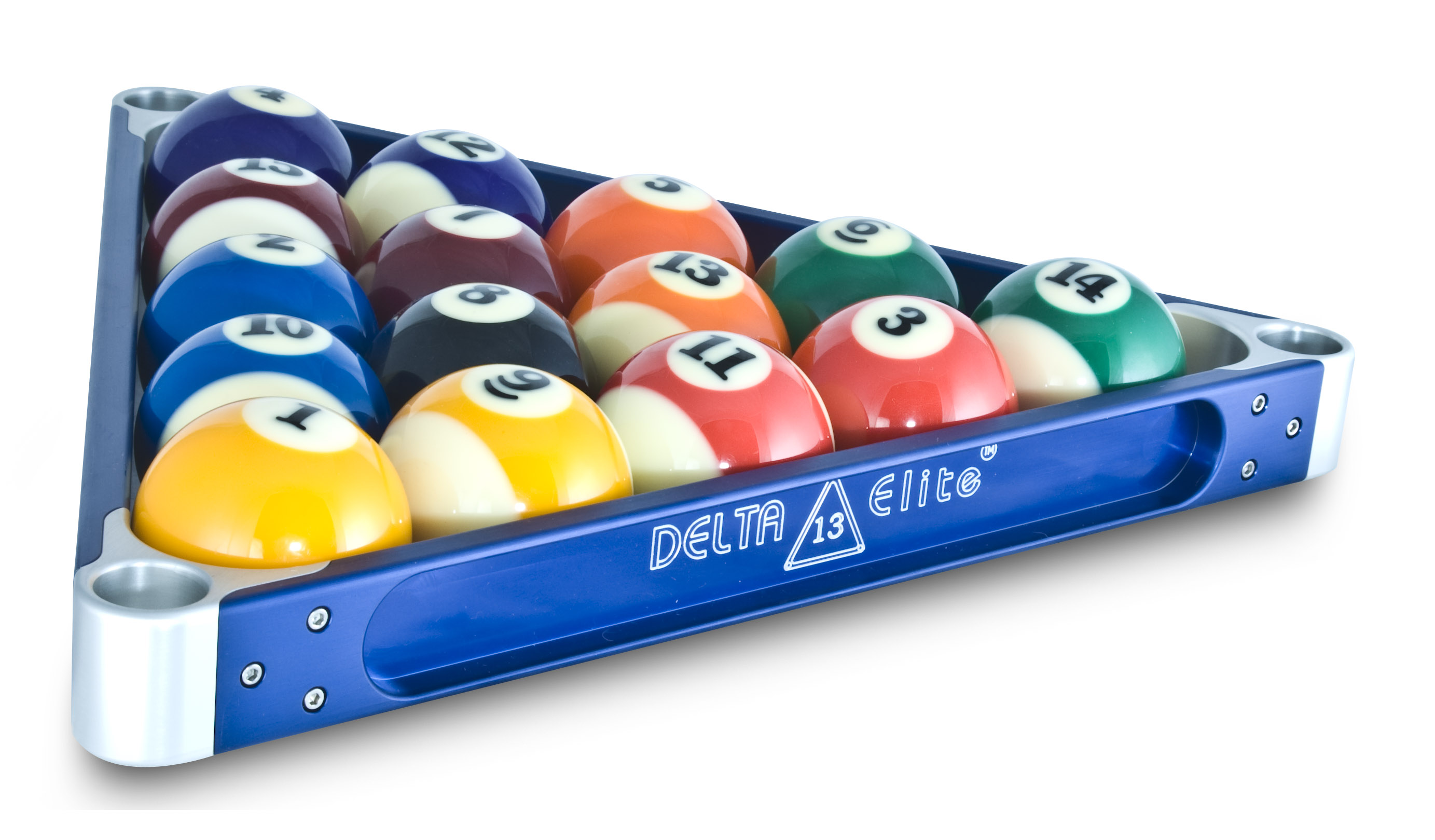
An aluminum rack set up for eight-ball, breaker's view. Note 1 ball in front, centered 8 ball, staggered ball pattern, and different rear corners.

In eight-ball, 15 object balls are used. Under the world standardized rules, it is prescribed that:

- The 8 ball must be in the center of the rack (the second ball in the three-balls-wide row).
- The first ball must be placed at the apex position (front of the rack and so the center of that ball is directly over the table's foot spot).
- The two corner balls must be a stripe and a solid.
- All balls other than the 8 ball are placed at random, but in conformance with the preceding corner ball rule.
- The balls should be pressed tightly together without gaps, as this allows the best break possible.

In eight-ball, the rack is in the shape of an equilateral triangle since the number 15, also the count of the balls required to make the rack, is a triangular number (5 + 4 + 3 + 2 + 1 = 15)

=== Nine-ball ===
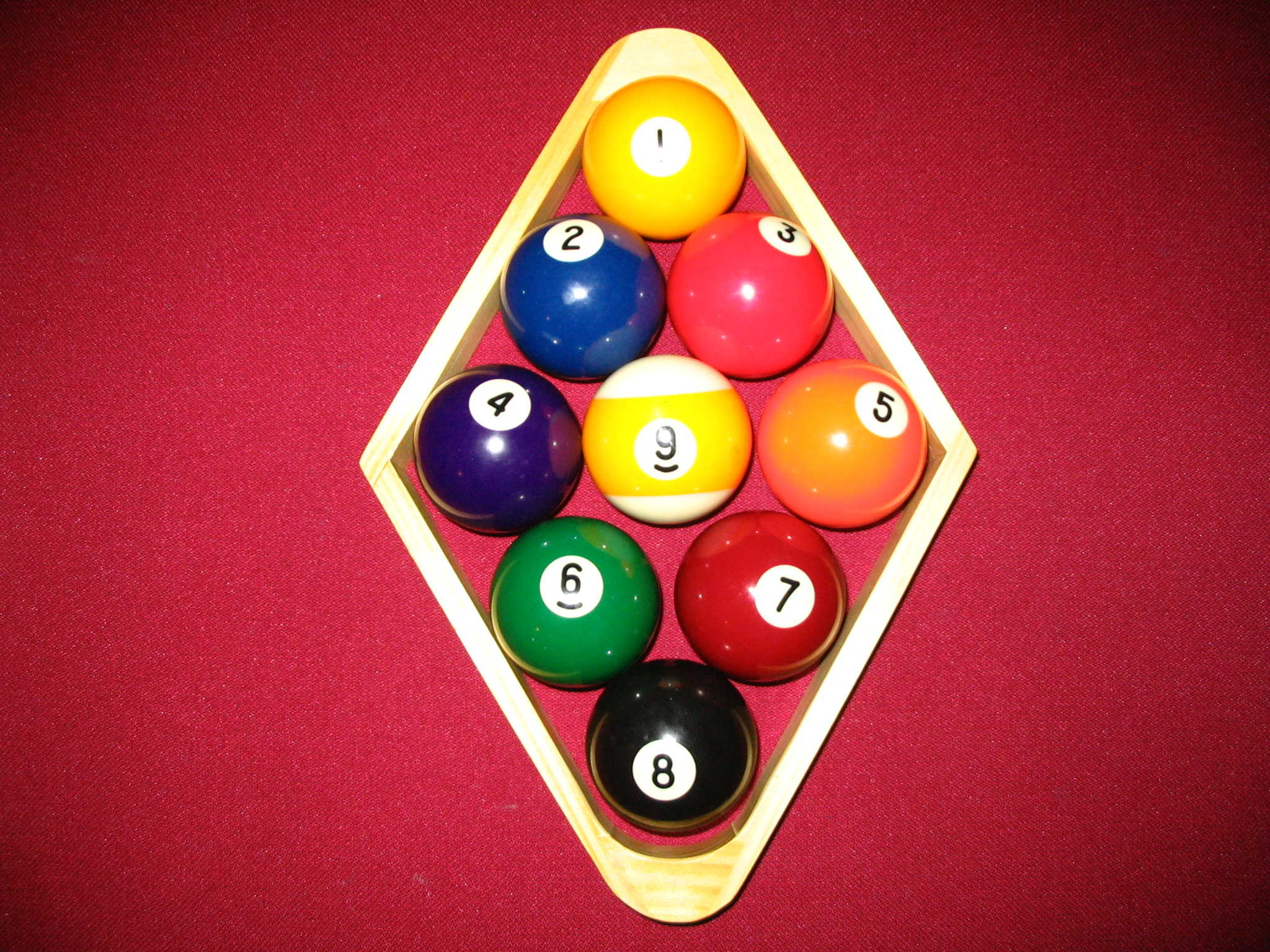
A diamond-shaped wooden nine-ball rack, racker's view: 1 ball in front, 9 ball centered.

In nine-ball, the basic principles are the same as detailed in the eight-ball section above, but only balls 1 through 9 are used; the 1 ball is always placed at the rack's apex (because in nine-ball every legal shot, including the break, must strike the lowest numbered ball first) over the table's foot spot, and the 9 ball is placed in the center of the rack.

Some players (most often amateurs) place the balls in numeric order but for the 9 ball; from the top of the triangle down and from left to right, i.e., the 1 on the foot spot, followed by the 2 then 3 in the second row, and so on. However, all balls other than the 1 and 9 may be randomly placed.

In nine-ball games where a handicap is given by one player being spotted a ball, some tournament venues enforce a rule that the spotted ball must be racked as one of the two balls in the row directly behind the 1 ball.

=== Straight pool (14.1 continuous) ===
In the initial rack in straight pool, fifteen balls are racked in a triangular rack, with the center of the apex ball placed over the foot spot. Traditionally, the 1 ball is placed on the rack’s right corner, and the 5 ball on the left corner from the racker's vantage point to maximize contrast between the corner balls and the background, as the 1 and 5 are the brightest colored balls, however, the world standardized rules do not require this. All other balls are placed at random.

Straight pool is played to a specific number of points agreed on prior to the match's start, with each pocketed ball being worth one point to the shooter. Because the game is played to a number of points normally far in excess of the fifteen points total available in the initial rack (in tournament play, one-hundred fifty points), multiple intragame racks are necessary. Intragame racking employs a separate set of rules from those in place at the game's start.

After the initial rack, the balls are played until only the cue ball and one object ball remain on the table's surface. At that time, the fourteen pocketed balls are racked with no apex ball, and the rack is so placed so that if the apex ball were in the rack, its center would rest directly over the table's foot spot. Play then continues with the cue ball shot from where it rested and the fifteenth ball from where it rested prior to racking.

A number of rules have developed which detail what must be done when one or both of the cue ball and fifteenth object ball are either in the rack area at the time an intragame rack is necessary, or are in such close proximity to the intragame racking area, that the physical rack cannot be used without moving the one or the other. The rules also vary depending on whether the cue ball or fifteenth ball are resting on the table's head spot. Such rules are detailed on the following chart (note therein that the kitchen refers to the area behind the table's head string).

Straight pool intragame racking chart
| 15th ball lies | Cue ball lies | | |
| 15th ball lies | In the rack | Not in the rack and not touching the head spot | Touching the head spot |
|---|---|---|---|
| In the rack | 15th ball: foot spot Cue ball: in kitchen | 15th ball: head spot Cue ball: in position | 15th ball: center spot Cue ball: in position |
| Pocketed | 15th ball: foot spot Cue ball: in kitchen | 15th ball: foot spot Cue ball: in position | 15th ball: foot spot Cue ball: in position |
| Behind head string but not on head spot | 15th ball: in position Cue ball: head spot | | |
| Not behind head string and not in the rack | 15th ball: in position Cue ball: in kitchen | | |
| On head spot | 15th ball: in position Cue ball: center spot | | |

=== One-pocket and bank pool ===
In both one-pocket and bank pool all fifteen object balls are racked entirely at random, with the center of the apex ball placed directly over the foot spot.

=== Snooker ===
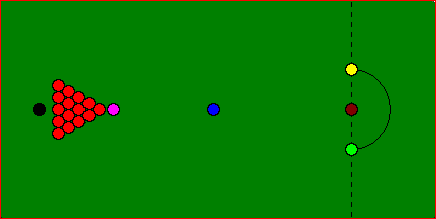
Snooker table in starting position

Snooker is played on a large table (full, pro tournament size is 12 × 6 ft). It is played using a cue stick, one white ball (the cue ball), fifteen red balls and six colours: a yellow (worth two points), green (three points), brown (four points), blue (five points), pink (six points) and black ball (seven points). At one end of the table (the "baulk end" ) is the so-called baulk line, which is 29 inches from the baulk end cushion. A semicircle of radius 11.5 inches, called the "D", is drawn behind this line, centred on the middle of the line.

On the baulk line, looking up the table from the 'baulk end', the yellow ball is located where the "D" meets the line on the right, the green ball where the "D" meets the line on the left, and the brown ball in the middle of the line. An easy way to remember these positions is with the mnemonic, 'God Bless You', with the first letter of each word being the first letter of the three colours as they are racked from left to right on the baulk line. At the exact middle of the table sits the blue ball. Further up the table is the pink ball, which sits midway between the blue spot and the top cushion, followed by the red balls (one each), placed in a tightly-packed triangle behind the pink. The apex must be as close as possible to the pink ball without touching it. Finally, the black ball is placed on a spot 12.75 inches from the top cushion on a full-size table.

Coloured ball racking positions must be remembered with care, as each time a coloured ball is potted, it is immediately replaced to its starting position, which occurs multiple times per frame, whereas reds are not returned to the table's surface after being potted.

If the starting position spot for a coloured ball is covered by another ball, the ball is placed on the highest available spot. If there is no available spot, it is placed as close to its own spot as possible in a direct line between that spot and the top (black end) cushion, without touching another ball. If there is no room this side of the spot, it will be placed as close to the spot as possible in a straight line towards the bottom cushion, without touching another ball.
