= Huis ter Kleef =

Former castle in Haarlem, Netherlands

- Haarlem, the Netherlands
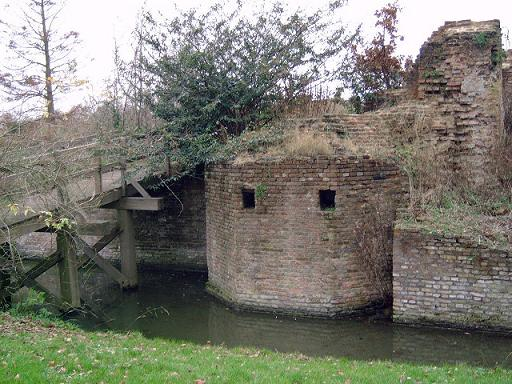
- Ruïnes Huis ter Kleef

Site information
- Type: Castle
- Owner: City of Haarlem
- Open to the public: during daylight hours
- Condition: Ruin

Location
- The Netherlands
- Coordinates: 52.396°N 4.635°E

Site history
- Built: 1370
- Materials: Brick
- Demolished: 1573
- Battles/wars: Siege of Haarlem

Garrison information
- Occupants: City gardens

The ruins of the Huis ter Kleef castle are located in the city gardens of Haarlem.

== History ==
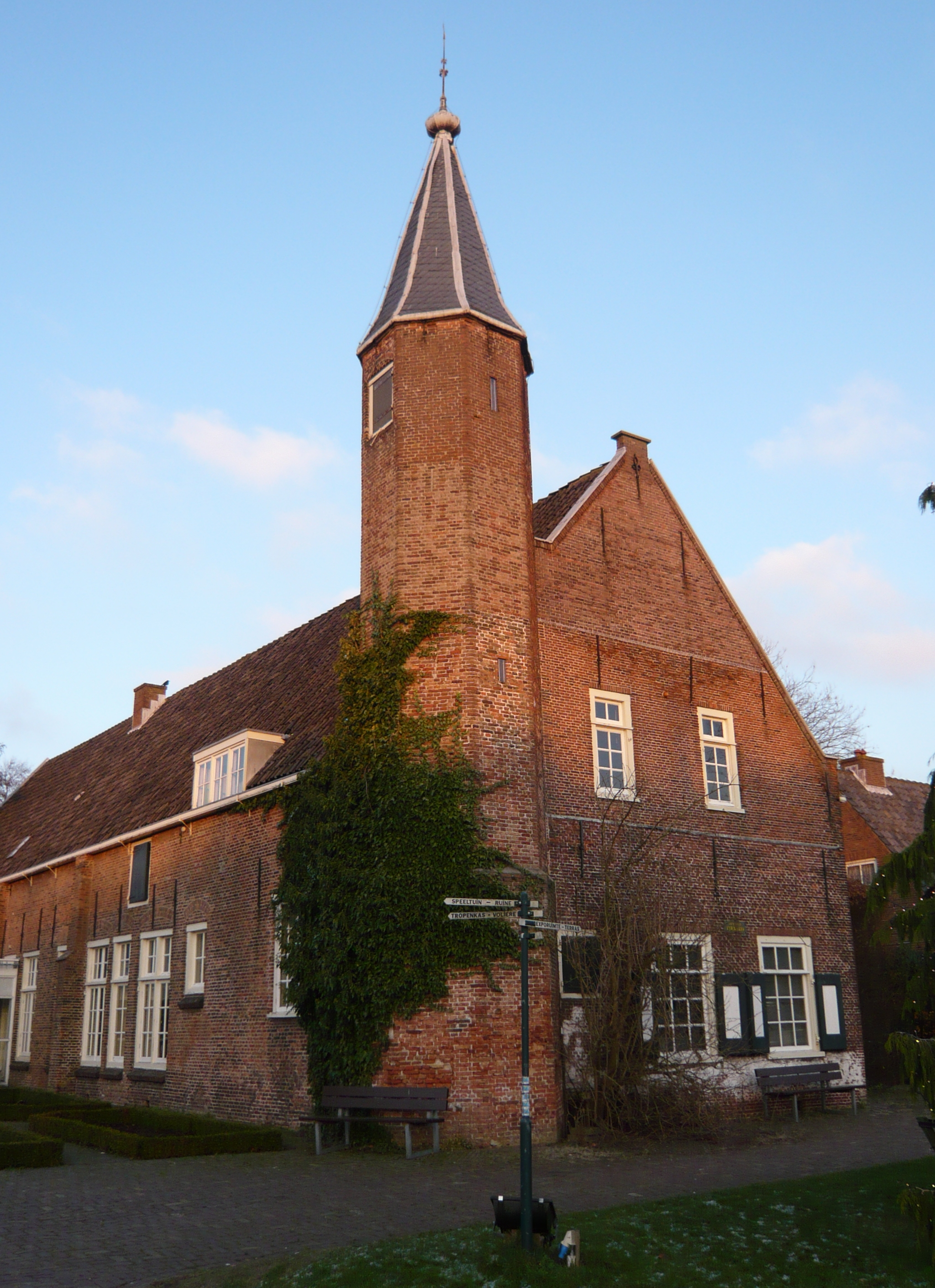
The Kaatsbaan was the only building left standing of the original complex

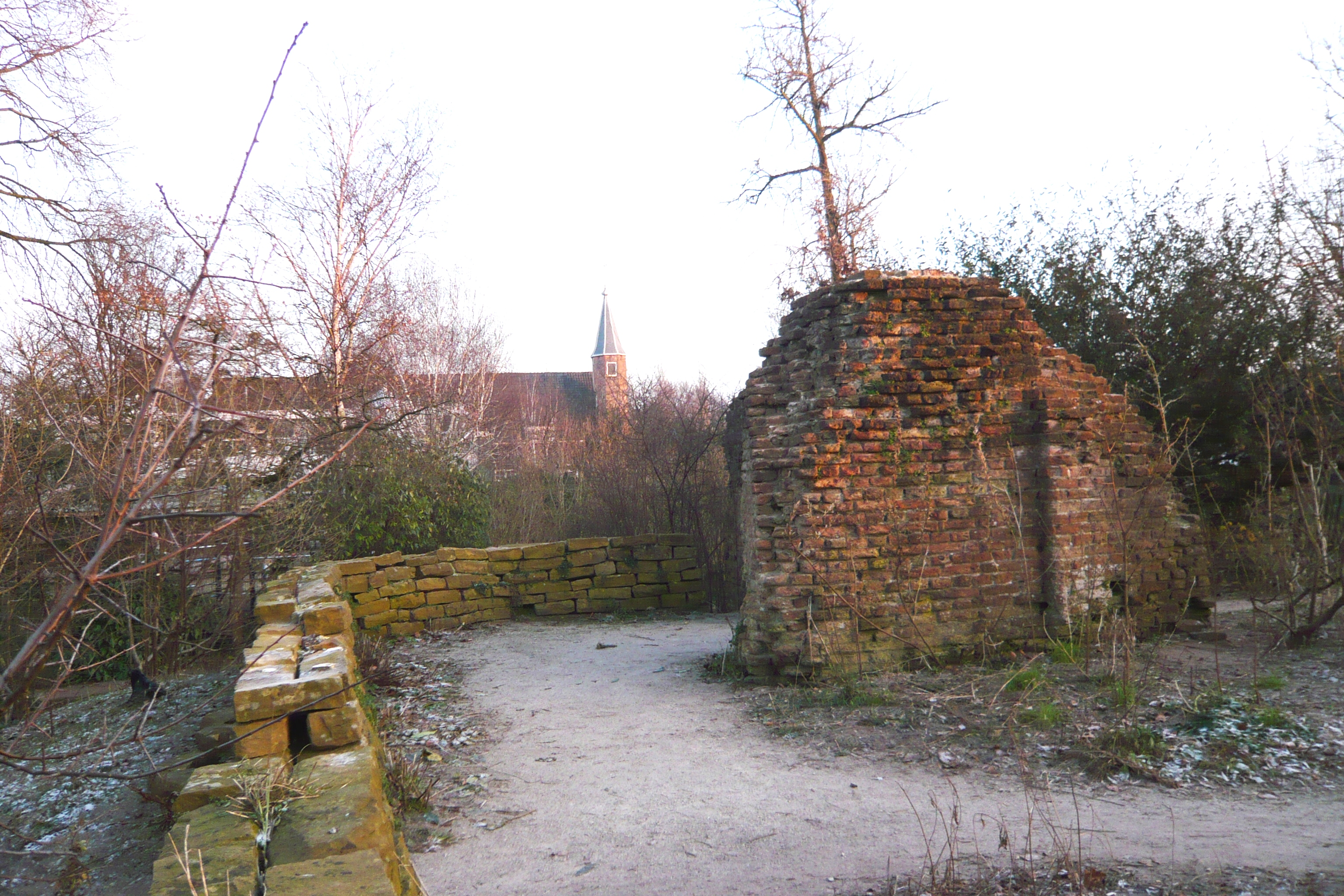
From the top of the pile, you can see the Kaatsbaan

The castle is located about halfway between the Brederode Castle and the Haarlem City Hall, which were built respectively in the second half of the 13th century and 1370, and probably dates from that period, when it is referred to as Huis te Schoten. Situated a mile and a half from Haarlem center, in those days it was situated in the middle of a town called Schoten. In 1403 it was given to Margaret of Cleves (c.1375-1411), and has since retained that name.

During the Siege of Haarlem in 1572 it was the headquarters of the Spanish army, under the leadership of the duke of Alva. It was blown up in 1573 and badly damaged, the rubble was used for city expansion. The house nearby with a tower called the "Kaatsbaan" was long considered the only building left standing, though recent archeological research suggests that the foundations have older stones than the rest and perhaps it was itself rebuilt after the explosion. The property changed hands several times until it was purchased by the city of Haarlem in 1713. The name "Kaatsbaan" refers to the sport Jeu de paume, an indoor precursor of tennis or to "Kaatsen" (Frisian handball), which presumably was once played here, though in the 18th century this^{what?} was probably "Kolven", a sport somewhat like golf. The St. Eloy's Hospice, an old guild hall in the center of Utrecht, similarly became a center for the Kolf sport after the guilds were disbanded.

Stones from the central castle ruin can still be seen in surrounding buildings. The Kaatsbaan was used as a residence for former owners and is now also in use by the city gardens.

In February 2006, the City of Haarlem agreed to a proposal to restore the court at Huis ter Kleef, if the Real Tennis Club Huis ter Kleef could raise the necessary funds (approximately €1,450,000).

== See also ==
- List of castles in the Netherlands
- Castle Brederode, another castle ruin nearby, open to the public
- Berkenrode, another castle ruin nearby, though privately owned
