= William McConnell =

William McConnell may refer to:

- William McConnell (illustrator) (1833–1867), English illustrator and cartoonist
- William W. McConnell (1834–1895), American politician from Pennsylvania
- William J. McConnell (1839–1925), US senator from Idaho
- William B. McConnell (1849–1931), justice of the Dakota Territorial Supreme Court
- William McConnell (footballer) (1889–1966), Irish sportsman
- William McConnell (trade unionist) (died 1928), British trade unionist and political activist

== See also ==
- Billy McConnell (disambiguation)
- William McConnel, British Industrialist
- William McConnell Wilton, Unionist politician from Northern Ireland
