= Billy McConnell =

Billy McConnell or Bill McConnell may refer to:

- Billy McConnell (field hockey) (born 1956), Northern Irish hockey player
- Billy McConnell (footballer) (1901–1973), Irish footballer
- Billy McConnell (motorcyclist) (born 1986), Australian motorcycle racer
- Bill McConnell (rower) (1927 – mid-1980s), Canadian rower

== See also ==
- William McConnell (disambiguation)
