= Trucco =

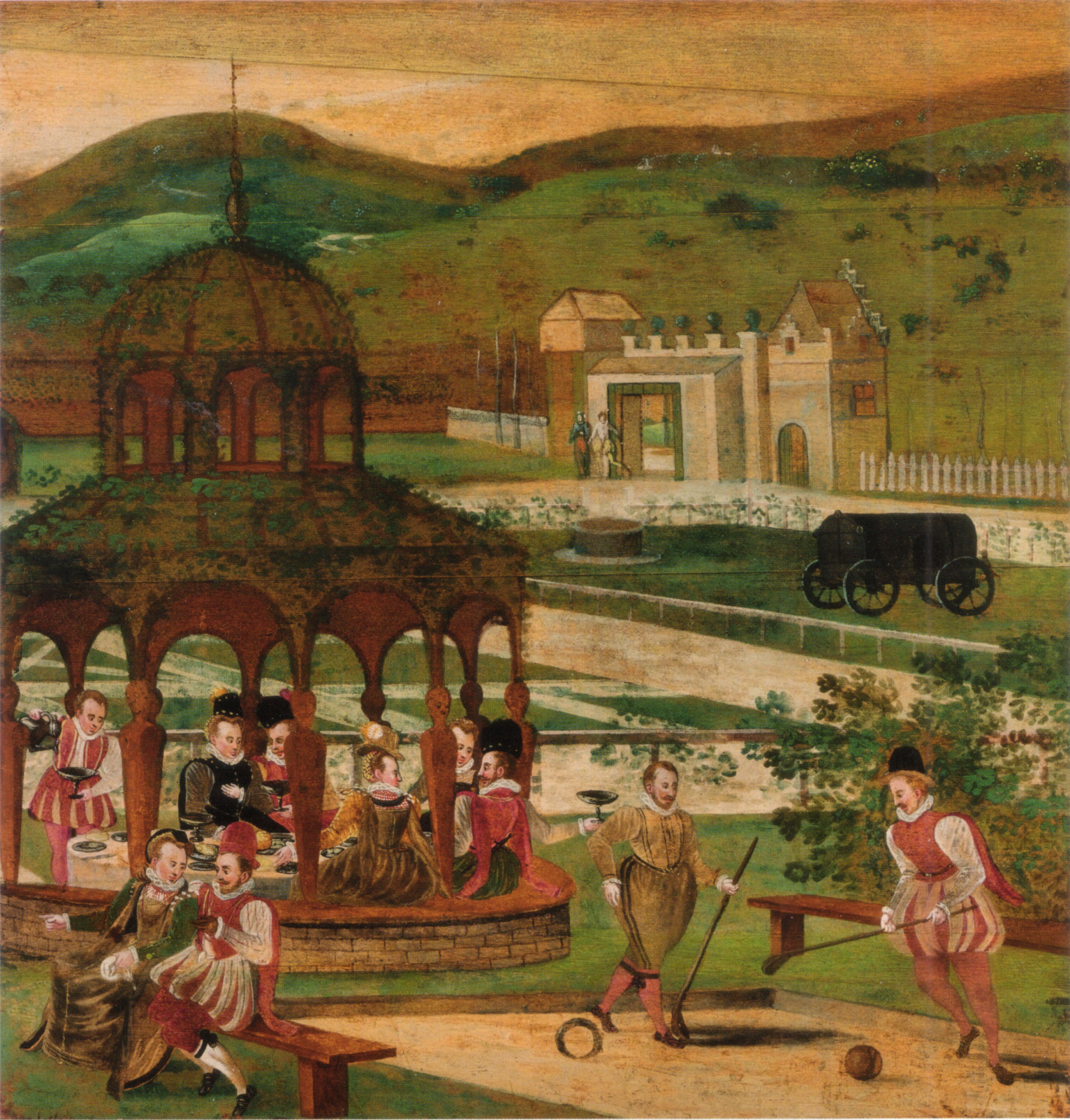
Two gentlemen play trucco while an elegant company dines in a gazebo. English, early 17th century.

Trucco (also called trucks, troco, or lawn billiards) is an Italian and later English lawn game, a form of ground billiards played with heavy balls, large-headed cues sometimes called tacks, a ring (also called the argolis or port), and sometimes an upright pin (the sprigg or king). The game was popular from at least the 17th century to the early 20th century, and was a forerunner of croquet, surviving for a few generations after the introduction of the latter.

== History ==
The oldest name in English seems to be trucks or truck from the Italian trucco and Spanish troco, meaning 'billiard'. The game appears to be derived from jeu de mail and its offshoot pall-mall (the latter having been especially popular in England in the 16th and 17th centuries, as well as in western continental Europe); both were earlier ground billiards games, using mallets and often featuring a hoop target (then usually made of straw).

Trucco was popular as a country-house pastime in the 19th century. Under the name lawn billiards, it appears as an alternative to croquet in English books of games and pastimes of the period, and was also attested in the United States in this period. Trucco was also played at pubs with large lawns, but apparently died out by the time of World War II. The 1884 edition of Enquire Within upon Everything, a concise household-life handbook and topical encyclopedia, suggested that the game was popular enough in England in the late Victorian era that "the balls, cues, &c., are sold by most dealers in croquet implements".

== Contemporary observations ==
An English painting of the early 17th century illustrates two fancily-dressed gentlemen playing trucco in small rectangular court without turf (probably clay, and perhaps 10–12 feet (3.0–3.7 m) wide and of larger but indeterminate length) bounded with wooden boards, using scoop-shaped maces, a ring-shaped target mounted upright on the ground, and a single leather or wooden ball barely small enough to fit through the hoop, and well under 1 foot (0.30 m) in diameter, if the scale in the image can be trusted. By the 19th century, the game in the same country was played in a round and usually unbounded area, often a lawn, and there was a ball for each player.

The late-19th-century version of trucco was described in many editions of Enquire Within (spellings are as in the original):

This is a game that may be played by any number of persons in a field or open space. The implements are wooden balls and long-handled cues at the ends of which are spoonlike ovals of iron. In the centre of the Troco ground is fixed a ring of iron, which moves freely on a pivot .... The wooden ball is lifted from the ground by means of the spoon-ended cue, and thrown towards the ring – the object of the player being to pass the ball through the ring; and he who succeeds in making any given number of points by fairly ringing his ball, or canoning against the other balls, wins the game.

Canons are made by the player striking ... balls successively with his own ball fairly delivered from his spoon. Thus ... a clever player may make a large number of points – five, seven, or more at a stroke: two the first canon, two for a second canon, and three for the ring. This, however, is very seldom accomplished.

Considerable skill is required in throwing the ball, as the ring, turning freely on its pivot, twists round on being struck. To "make the ring," it is necessary, therefore, that the ball be thrown fairly through its centre. But in order to get nearer to it a judicious player will endeavour to make two or three canons, if the balls lie within a convenient distance and at a proper angle to each other.

== Rules and equipment ==
The English rules, as of 1884 (and republished intermittently until at least 1916), called for a circular playing area at least 8 yards (7.3 m) across (often considerably larger), with the rotating-ring port fixed in the center. This was mounted, almost flush with the ground, on a stake (which might be attached to a buried board for additional stability), and was required to turn freely. Each player used a single ball, smooth, spherical, typically made of lignum vitae or boxwood, and weighting 3–5 pounds (1.4–2.3 kg). A ball in-play was manipulated only with a mace (cue), which was long, wooden, and had a curved iron head like a giant spoon. The game did not involve any un-"owned" object balls; every ball in play was that of a player. Unlike some other forms of ground billiards and indeed of trucco itself, the late English game did not involve a pin target, had a turning instead of stationary port, and required not the rolling of balls along the ground, but rather the tossing of them with the maces. Formal competition was presided over by an umpire, who bindingly settled any scoring disputes.

The game required two players, or more but divided into two teams, and was played to a predetermined number of points (typically 15 or 21); whichever player or team reached this score was the victor. The nature of the scoring system would have been conducive to three or more directly competing players (more than two sides), but Enquire Within does not lay out such a variation.

The game began with players outside the circular playing area. The first player to shoot (presumably determined by coin-toss), used the mace to hurl their ball at the target ring, from any position outside the playing circle the chose, hoping to pass the ball through the ring (but to not go very far past it in the event of a miss). "Making one's ring" permitted another shot. Failing to do so ended that player's turn. After this first ball was put into play, players had two legal shots available: shooting for the ring, or shooting to hit an opponent's ball – a cannon shot (also called a carom in billiards terms, or a roquet in the jargon of croquet). Success at either the ring or a cannon permitted another shot; failure to do either ended the turn. Turns alternated between opposing players (or between teams, with teammates within them also rotating). A successful cannon earned 2 points, and a successful ring 3 points, and it was possible though uncommon to score more than three points on a single shot, such as by cannoning off two balls in series, or bouncing off a ball and through the ring, or throwing through the ring then rolling to cannon a ball.

Each ball in play was always left where it lay after a shot (legal or otherwise); there were no circumstances for ball-in-hand play, other than a ball being driven outside the defined playing circle and thus no longer being plain. In that event, the player to whom it belonged could move it to a preferred spot outside the ring at their next turn and play it from there, as with their beginning shot in the game. In team play, teammates were permitted to assist each other – e.g. with advice, or in attempting to use cannons to drive each other's balls closer to the ring for an easier shot on it, rather than knocking opponent balls further away – but no player was permitted within 4 yards of the ring until their own individual ball was in play.

All fouls cost a 1-point penalty. These included: playing the wrong ball; playing out of turn; knocking over the ring; taking more than a single step while executing a toss; or touching a ball "with hand or person" (except outside the playing area before introducing or re-introducing the ball into play).

The full text of the block quotation above had an error in it, besides the misspelling of cannon; it incorrectly suggested that a cannon was successfully driving one's ball into an opponent ball and then into another opponent ball; in a typical two-player game, there were only two balls in play, according to the detailed rules in the same publication, so this three-ball requirement could not have been possible. The quoted material was first published in a preface in another edition, without the detailed rules.

The rules of this and other outdoor games did not appear in either the original 1856 version of Enquire Within or the 1858, 1863, 1865, or 1872 editions; croquet appeared in some editions without trucco, as sometimes did other outdoor games, including lawn tennis, and sometimes indoor billiards games. As the publication came out twice or more annually for much of its print run, but only a few editions have been scanned and made available online, it is unclear in what range of editions trucco appeared (first indexed as "troco", later as "lawn billiards"). It did appear in 1884, 1886, 1894, and 1903; the latest known version in which it appeared was published in 1916.
