= Diogenes (British magazine) =

Satirical magazine

Diogenes, a Light upon many Subjects was a British weekly magazine of humour and satire established in 1853 with Robert Kemp Philp as the proprietor. Issue Number 1 appeared on 1 January 1853. The last issue, Number 137, appeared on 11 August 1855.

== History ==
In January 1853, Diogenes was founded as a direct rival and competitor to the weekly magazine Punch, which was founded in 1841. The first issue was sold on Saturday, 1 January 1853. The price of the newspaper was originally tuppence but was eventually raised to three pence.

Philp was the proprietor of Diogenes and supervisory editor of Watts Phillips, who functioned as sub-editor and provided cartoons under the name The Ragged Philosopher. Literary contributors included Robert Brough, William Brough, Angus Reach, Augustus Mayhew, and George Augustus Henry Sala. Besides Watts Phillips, in the first year the three main illustrators were William McConnell (1833–1867), Charles H. Bennett (1828–1867), and William Newman (1817–1870). Newman, a Roman Catholic, had resigned from Punch in April 1850 on account of its anti-Catholic editorial position. Starting in 1854, Alfred Thompson contributed numerous illustrations.
