= Ground billiards =

Family of European lawn games

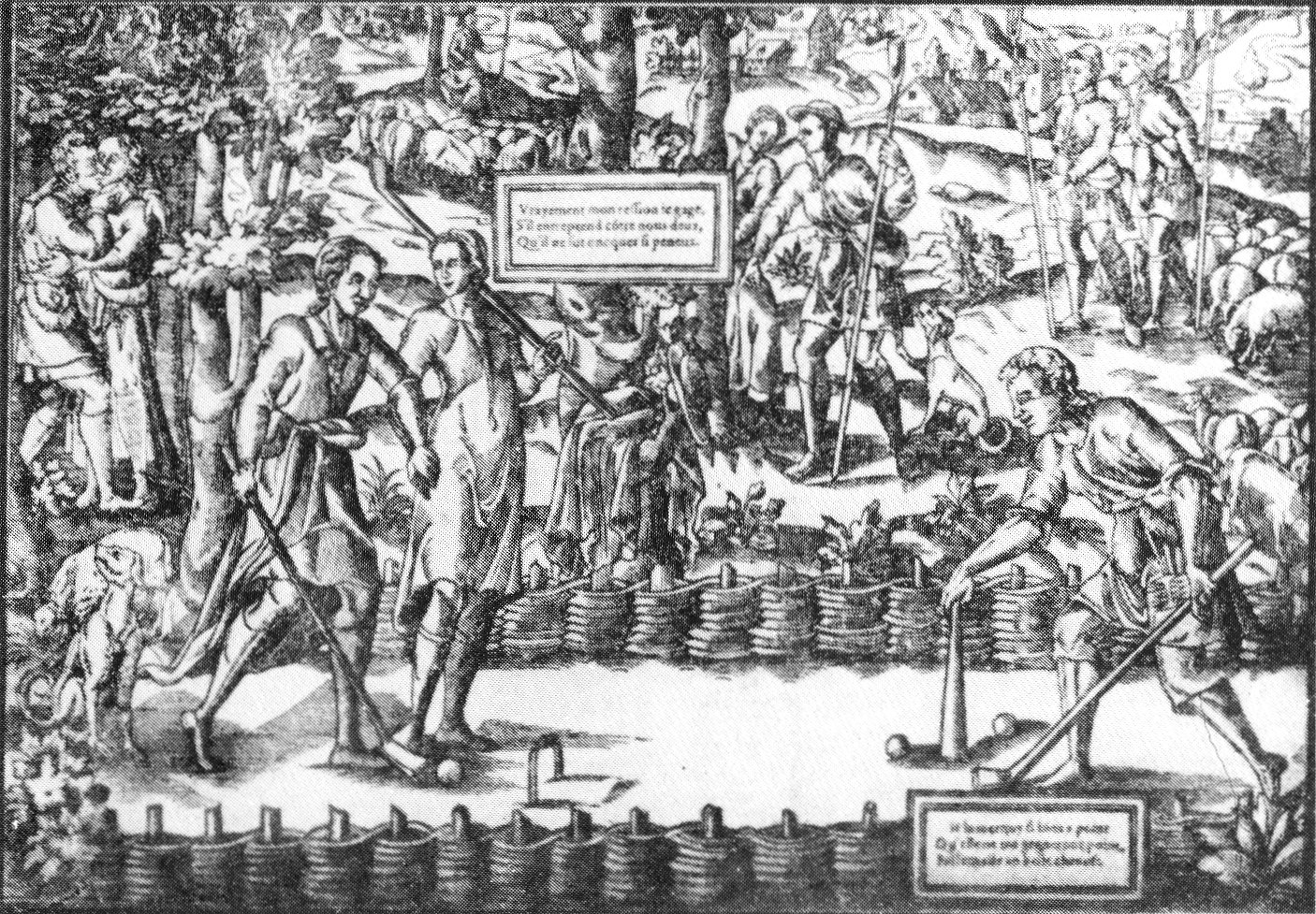
- Ground billiards in 15th-century France (1480 woodcut, based on the Saint-Lô Tapestry). This version uses a port (arch) and conical king pin, is bounded by a wicker railing, and appears to make use of one ball per player, with more than two players.
- First played: 14th–15th century Europe

Characteristics
- Contact: No
- Team members: Single opponents shown in illustrations; doubles or teams mentioned in 1674 indoor rules
- Mixed-sex: Yes
- Type: Outdoor and possibly indoor
- Equipment: Ball, mallet/mace, hoop, king pin
- Venue: Lawn or court

Presence
- Obsolete: Yes

Ground billiards is a modern term for a family of medieval European lawn games, the original names of which are mostly unknown, played with a long-handled mallet (the mace), wooden balls, a hoop (the pass), and an upright skittle or pin (the king). The game, which cue-sports historians have called "the original game of billiards", developed into a variety of modern outdoor and indoor games and sports such as croquet, pool, snooker, and carom billiards. Its relationship to games played on larger fields, such as hockey, golf, and bat-and-ball games, is more speculative. As a broader classification, the term is sometimes applied to games dating back to classical antiquity that are attested via difficult-to-interpret ancient artworks and rare surviving gaming artifacts.

== History ==
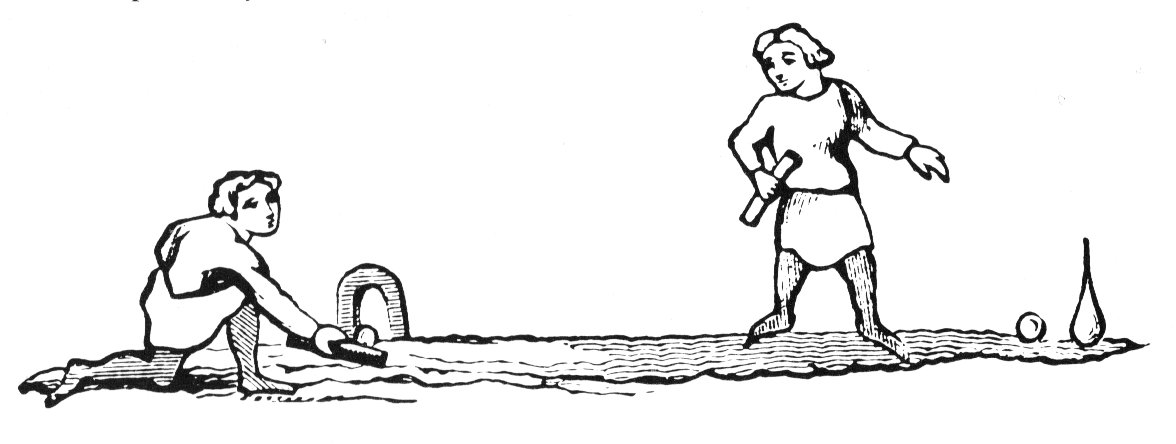
Ground billiards in England, c. 1300s (1801 woodcut reproduction of 14th century image). This variant uses short, crude mallets, the port, and a round-bottomed king pin.

Dating back to at least the 15th century as a tabletop game, and in recognizable form to as early as the 14th, this proto-billiards game appears to have been ancestral to croquet (19th century), trucco (17th century; also known as trucks or lawn billiards), pall-mall (Note: Some words for equipment in these games can be confusingly similar. While the Dutch paal used in kolven and the pallino used in bocce and related games both ultimately derive, as game implements, from the king pin of ground billiards, the words are "false friends", and not etymologically related. Paal, 'stake, stick', is cognate with English pole, both deriving from Latin pālus, 'pole, stake, prop'. Italian pallino, 'little ball, pellet', like the Middle English pall[e] in pall-mall/palle-malle (and the word pellet itself), are from Latin pīla, 'ball', in Late Latin sometimes rendered palla or balla via Frankish (Germanic) influence; cf. etymology of English ball.) (16th century), jeu de mail (15th century), and indoor cue sports (15th century if not earlier – what is usually meant by billiards today). The location of origin is obscure, with various scholars tracing it to medieval France, Italy, Spain, England, Germany, or more than one of these areas. More exotic and earlier origins have also been proposed.

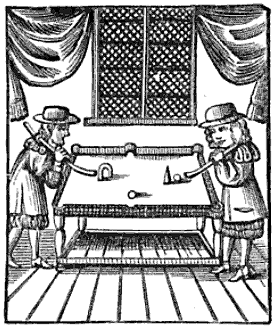
Engraving from Charles Cotton's 1674 book, The Compleat Gamester, showing the same game, including port and king, and finely-developed maces, being played on a 17th-century pocket billiards table

Even in the late 17th to early 18th centuries, indoor billiards was essentially the same game, with smaller equipment and played on a bounded table, with or without pockets. Use of the king pin declined first in most areas, followed by the abandonment of the port arch, though many variants featured both as well as pockets, while the king survived and even multiplied in some cases, leading to such modern cue games as five-pins. Some later stick-and-ball games, including cricket, also evolved multiple pin targets over time. Ground and table billiards were played contemporaneously, and the outdoor version remained known until at least the beginning of the 19th century; derived lawn games like croquet continue to the present day.

The game's relationships to bowling, golf, hockey, and bat-and-ball games are not entirely certain. It is clear that bowling, in its ancestral form of skittles, shares a common origin with ground billiards, as the two game types share both the basic objective, to direct a rolling ball towards one or more targets, and similar equipment, aside from the mace. Some contemporary sources depict the same game being played both with the hand and with a mace, and show a distinctive teardrop-shaped king pin design, with a rounded, wide bottom and a slender top. This pin shape suggests that it may have been the origin of the modern bottom-heavy design of bowling pins and similar skittles of various sizes used in a wide variety of games. A conical king or jack, or sometimes a spherical jack or pallino, as used in modern bowls, boules, bocce, and pétanque, has been employed in lawn-bowling games since at least as early as the 13th century in England; all these games have the same basic objective, to get as close to the jack as possible with one's own ball. Conical king pins are found in depictions and actual surviving game equipment (of carved stone) from Ancient Egypt. Later equipment was typically made of wood, sometimes also with clay, bone, or ivory pieces.

The Dutch game het kolven, a precursor of golf dating to at least the early 13th century, seems to be intermediate between ground billiards on the one hand, and both golf and ice hockey on the other (and its name is etymologically cognate with golf). It was played in a wicker-bounded court during warm weather, and on ice in the winter, like bandy. Players used maces (kolven) very similar to those shown in early ground billiards illustrations. At least one variant of it used holes in the ground, reminiscent of both golf holes and billiards pockets, instead of above-ground targets. The modern version, kolf or kolven, uses a tall, flat-bottomed king pin (paal, 'pole, stake').

Engravings dating back to c. 1300 show a game being played that is an early variant of either ground billiards or one-on-one field hockey (assuming there was any significant difference other than game speed and vigour), sometimes within a bounded area. A similar game has survived to modern times, in the form of box hockey (which uses a flat puck in a confined space, and archways or "mouse holes" cut into wooden barriers, rather than stand-alone arches).

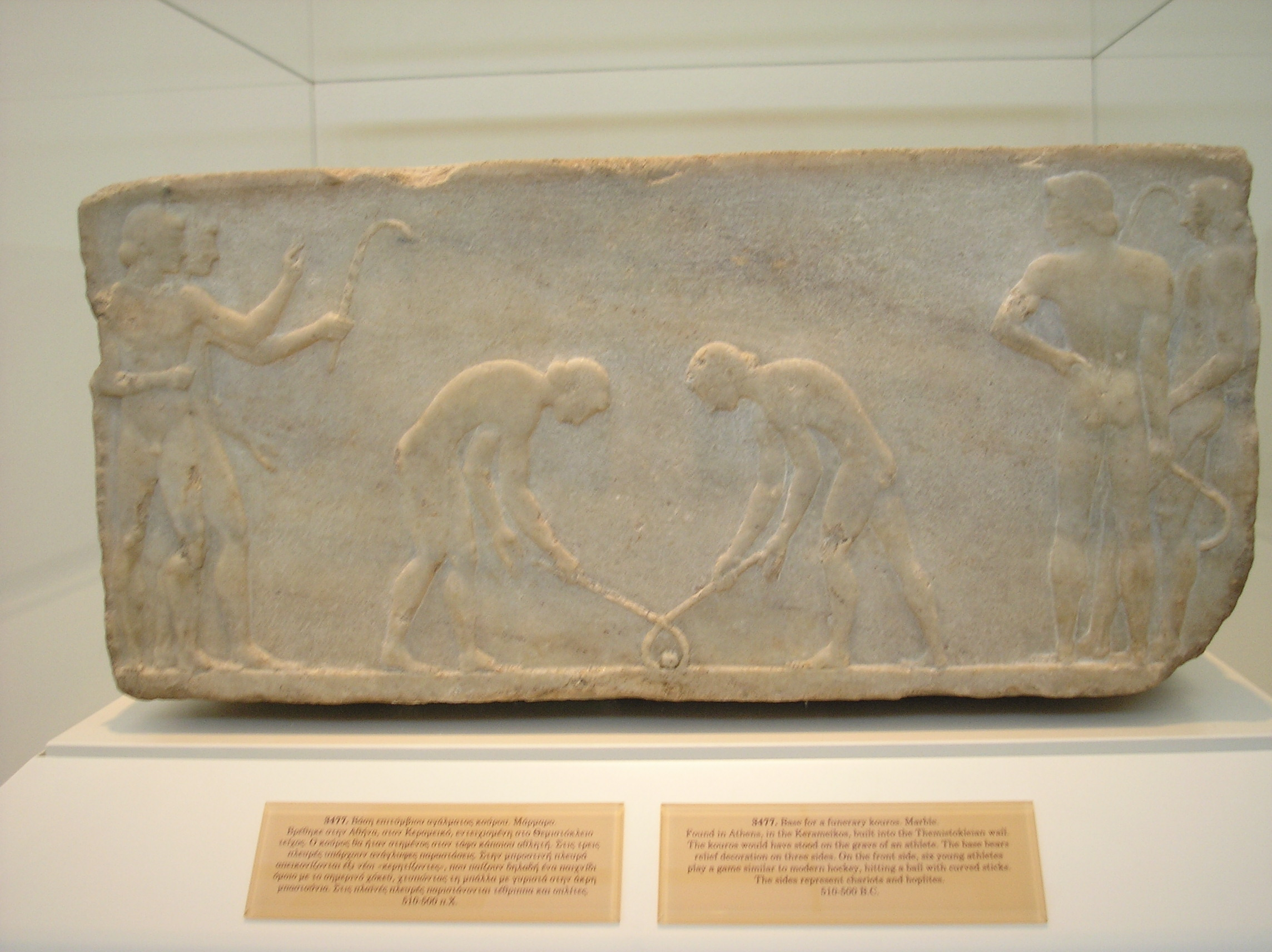
An Ancient Greek game, similar to and possibly ancestral to ground billiards and field hockey (c. 600 BCE)

There are hints that ground billiards may be far more ancient than the Late Medieval period. At least as early as 360 BCE, Romans played a somewhat golf-like game called paganica that could have degenerated to simpler, smaller-scale lawn games during the Dark Ages. Third century BCE Greece has also been proposed. Earlier still, a bas relief dating to c. 600 BCE depicts an ancient Greek ball game, a possible ancestor of both ground billiards and field hockey, which may have been called kerētízein or kerhtízein (κερητίζειν) because it was played with an implement shaped like a horn (kéras, κέρας). (Note: There are clear depictions of the ancient Greek game in period materials, but the identification of it with the name κερητίζειν is disputed; see, e.g.: http://sarantakos.wordpress.com/2010/03/29/keretizein/ (English summary at https://hellenisteukontos.blogspot.com/2010/03/ancient-greek-field-hockey.html).) It appears to be basically the same as the Medieval European activity of c. 1300 CE. An ancient Greek game said (in Leila Dorion's and Julia Shepherd's 1928 History of Bowling and Billiards) to be "analogous to billiards" was reported in Greek writings around 400 BCE, contemporary with the game's play.

Billiards scholars Victor Stein and Paul Rubino conclude in The Billiard Encyclopedia that there is an unbroken chain of game evolution from very widespread prehistoric ball-and-stick games and rituals, through the civilizations of classical antiquity, to modern lawn and cue sports in Europe and Asia. Even polo – a cavalry-training sport with origins among the Iranic peoples of the central Asian steppes and directly attested since at least the Parthian Empire (247 BCE – 224 CE) of Ancient Persia – is essentially the same core game as field hockey or team ground billiards, but played on horseback with a longer cue-mallet. A set of gaming pieces, buried with a child dating to c. 3300 BCE in Egypt, features stone balls, skittles, and an arch (no cue/mace was included in the recovered artifacts). Stein and Rubino, among other researchers, believe that games such as early ball-and-stick activities, chess, and many others were primarily brought into Europe from the Near East and Middle East by returning Crusaders from the 12th century onward, and that the pastimes were kept alive and evolving on that continent principally by the Christian clergy. Ireland has also been proposed as a time and place of origin; the stick-and-ball game hurling (also called camogie, as a women's sport) dates to the 1200s there.

Late medieval ground billiards is seen as the precursor of many later, more familiar outdoor and indoor games, including croquet and its variants, and table-based billiards games including snooker, pool (or pocket billiards, including nine-ball, eight-ball, etc.), pocketless carom billiards varieties, and the hybrid pocket–carom English billiards. Ground billiards is described as "the original game of billiards" by Michael Ian Shamos in The Encyclopedia of Billiards, an assessment echoed word-for-word by Stein and Rubino.

Games played with crook-footed sticks and a ball have been found throughout history around the world. For example, in Inner Mongolia in modern-day China, the Daur people have been playing beikou, a game similar to modern field hockey, for about 1,000 years.

Stein and Rubino also devote considerable historico-cultural analysis to the Ancient Egyptian lawn/court and board games with equipment similar to medieval European lawn billiards and to bat-and-ball games, and they speculate that for the Egyptians there may have been rich religious symbology involved. They note the resemblance of the games' ball, shooting stick, and king pin to the orb, sceptre or ceremonial mace (which originally had a crook at the top like a gaming mace), and crown of imperial regalia, which later were adopted by the pagan Romans and (in modified form) in turn by medieval rulers of Christendom. It is suggestive that games like ground billiards in the medieval Christian world were for centuries primarily the purview of and preserved by the clergy and the nobility, with peasant game-playing suppressed to the extent possible by many rulers, as unproductive.

== Game play and equipment ==
The exact rules of game play, and whether these rules were consistent from region to region, are unknown. English rules recorded in Charles Cotton's The Compleat Gamester (1674), for an indoor version played on a billiards table, indicate that the general offensive goal of the game is to use a club-like cue, called the mace or tack, to drive one's own ball through a hoop, called the pass, port, argolis, or ring, thus earning a chance to shoot at the upright king pin or sprigg, and to use defensive position play to thwart an opponent's ability to do likewise, e.g. by kissing an opposing ball to an unfavorable location (still a key strategy in many cue sports and lawn games). Points were scored for touching the king pin with one's ball without knocking the pin over (which would cost the loss of a point). Games were played to a set number of points, such as five or seven, and could be between two (or sometimes more) individual competitors or doubles teams, each with one ball. Neutral object balls were not mentioned in Cotton's work or depicted in any contemporary illustrations. Cotton's indoor version made use of pockets in the sides of the table as hazards, with additional scoring opportunities, and some outdoor ground-billiards courts may have used golf-style holes for the same purpose.

An outdoor form of the game that survived until the early 20th century was trucco. Its rules were covered in popular works like the Victorian advice book Enquire Within upon Everything, which also called it simply "lawn billiards" (and which covered the related game croquet separately). Trucco, in this well-documented form, was played in a round area at least 8 yards (7.3 m) in diameter by two players (or more, in two teams). The game used large, heavy balls and iron-headed maces like giant spoons which were used to toss rather than roll one's ball toward the port, by this stage a freely rotating metal ring mounted on a stake and almost flush with the ground. Scoring shots included passing one's ball through the port, and striking an opponent's ball with one's own (a cannon or carom shot, in billiards terms, or in croquet called a roquet). Part of the strategy of this form of the game was using such shots to get close enough to the port for a shot at it to be easier (failing to go dead-center would likely result in not just a miss but rotation of the ring to an unpredictable position, or even in knocking the ring down, which was a foul with a penalty). A prior form, illustrated in an early-17th-century English painting, shows a smaller, rectangular court, and only one ball between two players. Some continental European forms did involve a king pin.

The balls, mace, and other equipment for ground-billiards games were probably most commonly made of wood. The Complete Gamester, covering only the indoor variant favored by the wealthy, recommended hardwood such as lignum vitae for maces, and expensive ivory for balls and other equipment, but ivory's fragility would have made it impractical for the larger-scale and more forceful outdoor version of the game. Enquire Within suggested lignum vitae or boxwood for the balls. Early king pins were sometimes made of bone. Clay was also popular for balls in such games (including lawn-bowling varieties). Some illustrations suggest port hoops made of decorative wrought iron, while others are clearly of wood, stone, or another carved substance, and later examples are thin and wiry, similar to modern croquet hoops (wickets). The nature of the mace appears to move from crude to elegant over time, with earlier illustrations showing simple hammer- or crook-like implements, with players stooping, while later woodcuts and tapestries show a long, thin device more like a golf putter, and in basic form very similar to later, and more delicate and ornate maces used for table billiards before leather-tipped straight cues became the norm in those games. Similarly, the nature of the playing court appears to have evolved, beginning as any informal patch of ground, and becoming carefully delimited courts of turf or clay bounded by low (often wicker) barriers. Trucco, as an informal game played mostly at pubs and country houses, could be played anywhere the ground was relatively flat (the conventional Victorian rules simply called for at least 4 yards (3.7 m) from the outer edge of the playing area to the ring on every side). Most woodcuts and other illustrations of ground-billiards games show two players. A few show more (typically waiting and observing on the sidelines), but it is unclear if these represent teams, doubles, individual players in a many-player game, or people waiting their turn.

=== Legacy ===
A mid-20th-century version of ground billiards (aside from the aforementioned box hockey) has been played on a 30 by 60 ft (approximately 9 by 19 m) clay court. This may have been an influence from croquet, as roque, an early-20th-century Olympic variant of croquet, used a court of the same dimensions.

The term "king pin" or "kingpin", which today may refer to essential components of any system, from bosses of organized crime syndicates to the main support bolt in the axle assemblies (trucks) of skateboards, appears to derive from its usage as a key component of ground billiards, early skittle bowling, and related games.

The traditional green of billiards, pool, and snooker cloth represents a green lawn, and the earliest indoor table-top billiards games were played on a patch of turf brought indoors and put in a raised box, an idea first recorded in the court of King Louis XI of France (1461–1483).
