= Enquire Within upon Everything =

Book by Robert Kemp Philp

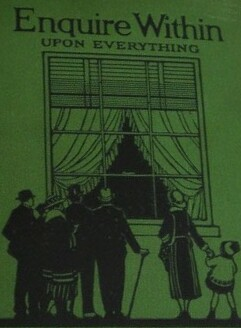
- 116th edition cover
- Editor: Robert Kemp Philp
- Language: English
- Genre: Non-fiction
- Publisher: Houlston and Sons
- Publication date: 1985
- Publication place: United Kingdom

Enquire Within upon Everything is a how-to book, akin to a short encyclopedia for domestic life, first published in 1856 by Houlston and Sons of Paternoster Square in London. The editor was Robert Kemp Philp. It was then continuously reprinted in many new and updated editions as additional information and articles were added (and obsolete material sometimes removed).

== Topics ==
The book was created with the intention of providing encyclopedic information on topics as diverse as etiquette, parlour games, cake recipes, laundry tips, holiday preparation, and first aid: To quote from the editor's introduction:

Whether You Wish to Model a Flower in Wax;
to Study the Rules of Etiquette;
to Serve a Relish for Breakfast or Supper;
to Plan a Dinner for a Large Party or a Small One;
to Cure a Headache;
to Make a Will;
to Get Married;
to Bury a Relative;
Whatever You May Wish to Do, Make, or to Enjoy,
Provided Your Desire has Relation to the Necessities of Domestic Life,
I Hope You will not Fail to "Enquire Within."

Though not rich in such material, Enquire Within also provided the basics of an English-usage style guide, and also preserved examples of regional dialect usage (which it tended to mock as faulty). Several editions between the 1880s and 1910s provide one of the only surviving records of the rules of the English version of trucco, a somewhat croquet-like form of ground billiards. Though some attempt was made to group related topics, in general the organization was chaotic, and required looking up topics in an index, then finding their numbered sections in the main text.

== History ==
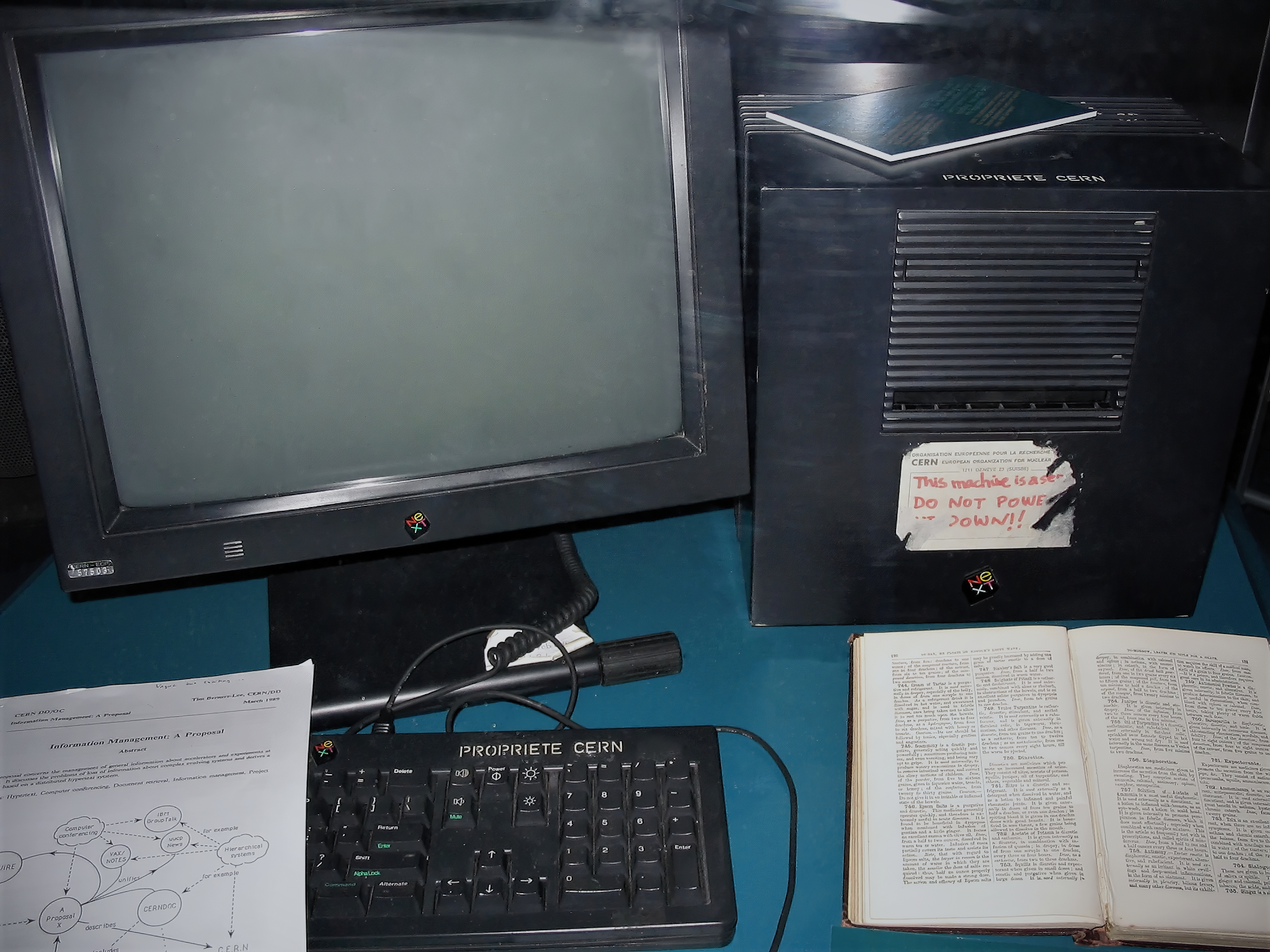
A copy of the book near the NeXTcube used by Tim Berners-Lee as the first Web server on the World Wide Web, on display at Microcosm, the science museum at CERN

The early editions of this book contained 3,000 short pithy descriptions and was one of a set of 20 books. The book was a popular addition to the Victorian (and later post-Victorian) home. By 1862, the book was sold 196,000 times; by the 89th edition, some 1,180,000 copies had been published. With the release of the 113th edition, this number had risen to over 1,500,000 and by 1976 was in its 126th edition. Modernised versions were still in print as late as 1994. Unauthorized reproductions of the first and some subsequent editions, without credit to the original editor and publisher, were made in United States by the New York publisher Garret, Dick & Fitzgerald, under the title Inquire Within for Anything You Want to Know. Later official editions (some time after 1894) were published by Simpkin, Marshall, Hamilton Kent & Co., also of London.

Agatha Christie used Enquire Within upon Everything as an important clue in the Hercule Poirot detective novel, Hallowe'en Party.

In 1980 Tim Berners-Lee named his precursor of the World Wide Web ENQUIRE after this work. A Forbes article quoted Berners-Lee as saying:

When I first began tinkering with a software program that eventually gave rise to the idea of the World Wide Web, I named it Enquire, short for "Enquire Within upon Everything", a musty old book of Victorian advice I noticed as a child in my parents' house outside London. With its title suggestive of magic, the book served as a portal to a world of information, everything from how to remove clothing stains to tips on investing money.
