= Robert Kemp Philp =

English journalist, author, and Chartist (1819-1882)

Robert Kemp Philp (1819–1882) was an English journalist, writer, and Chartist.

== Early life ==
Born at Falmouth on 14 June 1819, he was son of Henry Philp (1793–1836) of Falmouth. His grandfather Robert Kemp Philp (1769–1850), a Wesleyan and then Unitarian minister of Falmouth, was one of the earliest supporters of ragged schools and city missions.

== Chartist ==
On leaving school Philp was placed, in 1835, with a printer at Bristol, and then was a newsvendor in Bath, Somerset. For selling a Sunday newspaper, he was fined, and, on refusing to pay, was condemned to the stocks for two hours. He joined the Chartist movement, and edited a paper called The Regenerator, and, with Henry Vincent, The National Vindicator, a Bath weekly newspaper, which appeared from 1838 to 1842. In 1839 Philp began lecturing as a Chartist, of moderate opinions. After the Newport Rising (November 1840) he collected evidence for the defence of John Frost (d. 1877) [q. v.], and was arrested at Newport, Monmouthshire, on suspicion of complicity, but was released on bail. He joined on the executive committee of the Chartists in 1841.

In the spring of 1842 Philp signed the declaration drawn up by Joseph Sturge, and was appointed a delegate to the conference called by Sturge at Birmingham on 27 December 1842. As a result, Philp was ousted from the Chartist committee by the "physical force" group, led by Feargus O'Connor. He was a member of the national convention which sat in London from 12 April 1842, and is credited with having drawn up the monster petition, signed by 3,300,000 persons, and presented on 2 May, in favour of the confirmation of the charter. Philp was a contributor to The Sentinel from its launch on 7 January 1843.

== Later life ==
In 1845 Philp settled in Great New Street, Fetter Lane, London, as a publisher, and was sub-editor of the People's Journal from 1846 to 1848. He published, on his own account, the Family Friend, successively a monthly, fortnightly, and weekly periodical. He acted as editor from 1849 to 1852. It had an enormous sale. Similar serials followed: the Family Tutor (between 1851 and 1853), the Home Companion (from 1852 to 1856), and the Family Treasury (in 1853–4). He also edited Diogenes, a weekly comic paper (1853–4).

Philp died at 21 Claremont Square, Islington, on 30 November 1882, aged 64, and was buried in a common grave (no.25301) on the eastern side of Highgate Cemetery. He left an only son.

== Works ==
Philp compiled cheap handbooks on the practical topics of daily life. In many cases they were issued in monthly numbers at twopence. The most popular, Enquire Within upon Everything, appeared in 1856; a sixty-fifth edition followed in 1882, and in 1888 the sale had reached a total of 1,039,000 copies. By 1900 it had sold almost 1.3 million and remained in print until 1973 A supplement, The Interview, appeared in 1856; republished as A Journey of Discovery all round our House, London, 1867. Similar compilations were: Notices to Correspondents: Information on all Subjects, collected from Answers given in Journals, 1856, and The Reason Why: a careful Collection of some hundreds of Reasons for Things which, though generally believed, are imperfectly understood (1856, tenth thousand 1857). The last heralded a Reason Why series of volumes dealing with general science (1857, forty-fifth thousand 1867); domestic science (1857, 1869); natural history (1860); history (1859); the Bible (1859); Christian denominations (1860); the garden and farm (1860); and physical geography and geology (1863).

Philp's dictionaries of daily wants (1861), of useful knowledge, 1858–62 (issued in monthly parts), of medical and surgical knowledge, The Best of Everything, and The Lady's Every-day Book, 1873, were all popular. He also published a History of Progress in Great Britain, in sixpenny monthly parts, June 1859 to July 1860, which was reissued in two volumes (1859–60). The portions dealing with The Progress of Agriculture and the Progress of Carriages, Roads ..., were printed separately (London, 1858).

Philp was responsible for many further similar works. He also compiled guides to the Lake district and Wales, and to the Great Northern, the Midland (1873), London and North-Western (1874), London and South-Western (1874), Great Eastern (1875), London, Brighton, and South Coast (1875), and South-Eastern railways (1875). At least five songs by him were set to music, and he wrote a comedy, in two acts, The Successful Candidate (1853). His portrait was in vol. i. of the Family Treasury.
