= Kliek =

Sporting implement

A kliek (pronunciation: cleek) is a heavy, curved bat to play kolf with.

== Literature ==
- Kolven, het plaisir om sig in dezelve te diverteren. Uitgave 2001 van de Kolfclub Utrecht St. Eloyen Gasthuis. (in Dutch)
