= Pall-mall =

Mallet & ball game

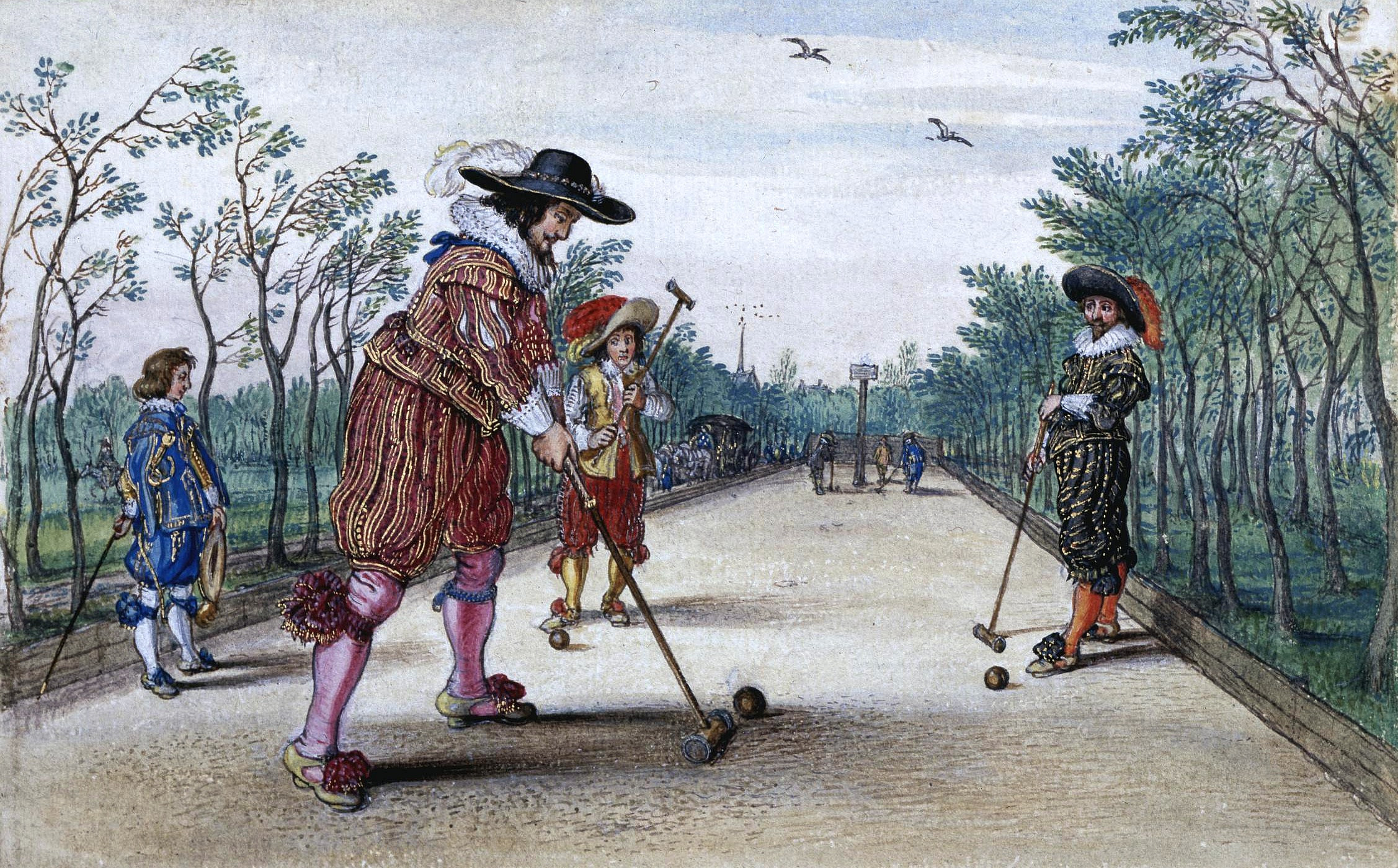
Drawing of a game of "pell-mell" between Frederick V of the Palatinate and Frederick Henry, Prince of Orange, by Adriaen van de Venne, c. 1620–1626.

Pall-mall, paille-maille, palle-maille, pell-mell, or palle-malle (/ˈpælˈmæl/, /ˈpɛlˈmɛl/, also US: /ˈpɔːlˈmɔːl/) is a lawn game (though primarily played on earth surfaces rather than grass) that was mostly played in the 16th and 17th centuries. It is considered a precursor to croquet.

== History ==
Related to Italian trucco (also known as lawn billiards or trucks in English) and similar games, pall-mall is an early modern development from jeu de mail, a French form of ground billiards.

The name comes from the Italian pallamaglio, which literally means 'ball mallet', ultimately derived from Latin palla, meaning 'ball', and malleus meaning 'maul, hammer, or mallet'. An alternative etymology has been suggested, from Middle French pale-mail or 'straw-mallet', in reference to target hoops being made of bound straw.

=== History in Britain ===
It appears that pall mall was introduced from France into Scotland and later to England. The 19th-century historian Henry B. Wheatley states that "pall mall was a popular game in the sixteenth and seventeenth centuries and few large towns were without a mall, or prepared ground, where it could be played; but it has now been so long out of use that no satisfactory account of the game can be found."

Mary, Queen of Scots, reportedly played pall mall at Seton Palace in East Lothian shortly after the murder of David Rizzio in the spring of 1566. King James VI in his 1599 Basilikon Doron mentions "palle maillé" among the "faire and pleasant field-games" suitable for his son Prince Henry.

The author Henry B. Wheatley speculated that the game was introduced to England from Scotland after the accession of James VI in 1603, quoting a statement from Robert Dallington's Method for Travell, that the game had not yet reached England. In the Method for Travell, which Wheatley dated to 1598 but may have been as late as 1605, Dallington marvels that pall-mall was one of the few French pastimes that had not been introduced to England.

The French ambassador Antoine Lefèvre de la Boderie said that Prince Henry (in England) in 1606 played golf, which he compared to "pallemail". One of Prince Henry's biographers, in a work published in 1634, mentioned that he played "gauffe (a play not unlike to Palemaille)". Prince Henry had a court or pitch, a "pell mell", laid out at St James' Fields, north of St James's Palace. It was surfaced with cockle shells crushed into clay or loam.

It is known that sometime around 1630 a Frenchman named John Bonnealle laid out a court for playing pall-mall on the south side of St. James's Square, London, in an area known as St. James's Field (later Pall Mall Field). "A year or two" later, in about 1631, Bonnealle had died and the king's shoemaker, David Mallard or Mallock, had built a house on this land, which he was ordered to demolish by Candlemas Day (around 2 February) 1632.

Evidently, the pall-mall court was rebuilt at this site, as Archibald Lumsden received a grant on 30 September 1635 "for sole furnishing of all the 'Malls,' bowls, scoops, and other necessaries for the game of Pall Mall within his grounds in St. James's Fields, and that such as resort there shall pay him such sums of money as are according to the ancient order of the game."

Lumsden's pall-mall court also appears in the records in September 1660, when his daughter Isabella petitioned for "one of the tenements in St. James's Field, as promised to her father who spent £425 14s in keeping the sport of Pall Mall". Accounts attached to the petition appeared to indicate the money was spent on "bowls, malls and scopes, 1632 to 1635, and in repairs in Pall Mall, when the Queen went thither to lie in of the Lady Mary."

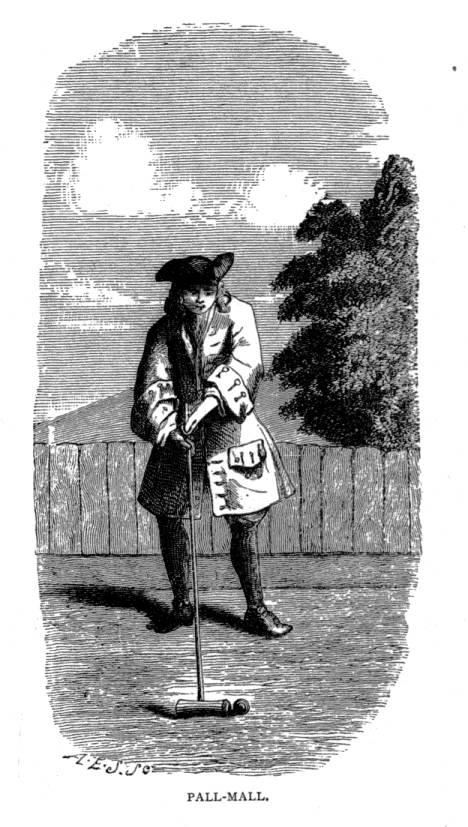
The game illustrated in Old English Sports, Pastimes and Customs, published 1891

Samuel Pepys's diary for 2 April 1661 records that he went "into St. James's Park, where I saw the Duke of York playing at Pelemele, the first time that I ever saw the sport".

There do not appear to be references earlier than 1630 to the game being played in England. The game is mentioned in a 1611 French–English dictionary, but this does not demonstrate that it was actually played in England at that time:

Palemaille : f. A game, wherein a round box bowle is with a mallet strucke through a high arch of yron (standing at either end of an alley one) which he that can do at the fewest blowes, or at the nu[m]ber agreed on, winnes.

— Randle Cotgrave, A Dictionarie of the French and English Tongues, 1611

Cotgrave's description of the long alley-like playing surface with an iron hoop at either end accords well with reports of the game as played in London twenty years later. However, there's little reason to read this as an implication that the game was played in England in 1611, especially given that he is providing an English definition of a French word.

An early 19th-century writer on English games, Joseph Strutt, quotes Cotgrave's description and the association with Restoration royalty:

The game of mall was a fashionable amusement in the reign of Charles the Second, and the walk in Saint James's Park, now called the Mall, received its name from having been appropriated to the purpose of playing at mall, where Charles himself and his courtiers frequently exercised themselves in the practice of this pastime. The denomination mall given to the game, is evidently derived from the mallet or wooden hammer used by the players to strike the ball.

— Joseph Strutt, The Sports and Pastimes of the People of England, 1810

The game was still known in the early nineteenth century, as is proved by its reference in many English dictionaries. In Samuel Johnson's 1828 dictionary, his definition of "Pall mall" clearly describes a game with similarities to modern croquet: "A play in which the ball is struck with a mallet through an iron ring". In his unpublished memoir the writer Oswell Blakeston reports seeing it played at "the only pub that still has a green for this game" in the late 1930s.

== Game play ==
It was played in a long alley with an iron hoop suspended over the ground at the end. The object was to strike a boxwood ball of unknown circumference (a modern croquet ball is normally 3 5/8 inches (9.2 cm) in diameter, which equates to approx 11 2/5 inches (29 cm), in circumference) with a heavy wooden mallet, down the alley and through the hoop with the fewest hits possible. Many references tell us that the ball was about 12 inches (30 cm) in circumference. However, it is known that this is not correct, as a ball of that size would be far, far too heavy to lift to a high height with a small mallet. Note the ball in the engraving. It is thought that the ball was likely in the region of 2 3/4 inches (7 cm) which equates to approx 8.7 inches (22 cm), in circumference) or slightly larger. It differed from trucco especially in its more extreme length of playing area, suggesting a closer relationship to golf than other derivatives of ground billiards.

Pall-mall was popular in Italy, France and Scotland, and spread to England and other parts of Western Europe in the 16th century. The name refers not only to the game, but also to the mallet used and the alley in which it was played. Many cities still have long straight roads or promenades which evolved from the alleys in which the game was played. Such in London are Pall Mall and the Mall, in Hamburg the Palmaille, in Paris the Rue du Mail, Il-Mall in Floriana, the Avenue du Mail in Geneva, and in Utrecht the Maliebaan. When the game fell out of fashion, some of these "pall malls" evolved into shopping areas, hence the modern name of shopping centres in North America—shopping malls—while others evolved into grassed, shady promenades, still called malls today.

== In popular culture ==
- Pall-mall features heavily in Julia Quinn's Regency romance novel The Viscount Who Loved Me and its subsequent second epilogue.
- The second season of the Netflix series Bridgerton, based on Quinn's novel, prominently features a game of pall-mall as an annual tradition for the siblings of the eponymous family. Because of the series' popularity, department store John Lewis reported a 90% spike in the sales of croquet sets, the modern equivalent of pall-mall.

== Sources ==
- Aikman, James (1827), History of Scotland of George Buchanan, vol. 2, Glasgow, pp. 497–498
- Almond, Jordan (January 1995), Dictionary of Word Origins: A History of the Words, Expressions, and Clichés We Use, Carol Publishing Group, ISBN 978-0-8065-1713-1
- Bain, Joseph (1900), Calendar State Papers Scotland: 1563–1603, vol. 2, Edinburgh, p. 558
- Bruce, John, ed. (1862), Calendar of State Papers, Domestic Series, of the Reign of Charles I, 1631–1633
- Cotgrave, Randle (1611), A Dictionarie of the French and English Tongues, London: Adam Islip
- Everett Green, Mary Anne, ed. (1860), Calendar of State Papers, Domestic Series, of the Reign of Charles II, 1660–1661
- Fagan, Louis (1887), 1836–1886. The Reform Club: Its Founders and Architect, B. Quaritch
- Hosack, John (1870), Mary Queen of Scots and her accusers, vol. 1, Edinburgh, p. 542
- Johnson, Samuel; Walker, John; Jameson, Robert S. (1828), A Dictionary of the English Language, vol. 1 (2 ed.), W. Pickering
- James VI & I (1616) [1599], Basilikon Doron, vol. iii
- Jusserand, J. J. (1996) [1901], Les sports et jeux d'exercice dans l'ancienne France, Paris: self-published
- Strutt, Joseph (1810), The Sports and Pastimes of the People of England
- Wheatley, Henry Benjamin (1870), Round about Piccadilly and Pall Mall
- Wheatley, Henry B., ed. (1893), The Diary of Samuel Pepys M.A. F.R.S., London: George Bell & Sons, available at Diary of Samuel Pepys, 2 April 1661.
