= St. Eloy's Hospice =

Guildhall in Utrecht in the Netherlands

Coordinates: 52°05′23″N 5°07′09″E

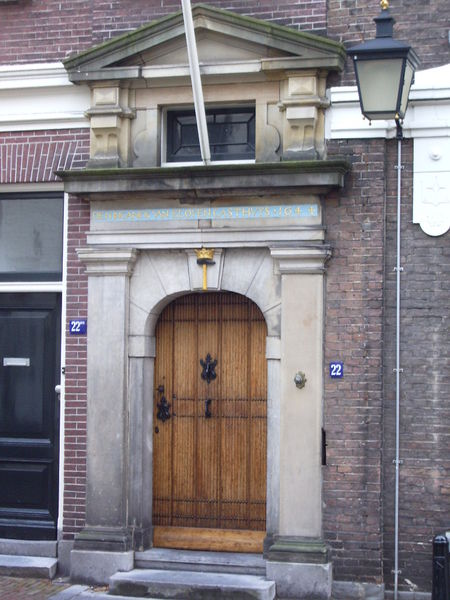
Entrance of St. Eloy's Hospice in Utrecht (1644)

St. Eloy's Hospice is a guildhall in Utrecht in the Netherlands.

Between the Dom tower and the Mariaplaats in Utrecht in The Netherlands there is a unique house that bears the name: St. Eloyen Gasthuis (St. Eloy's Hospice). The house has been occupied by the Smedengilde (guild of smiths) since 1440. According to documents preserved the guild has existed since 1304, but older. The house can be visited free of charge on the second Saturday of September. The fraternity is private nowadays.

== History ==
Associations of craftsmen and tradesmen, called guilds, were founded as early as in the 11th century in the Netherlands, Northern France and England. The blacksmith guild of Utrecht included the regular blacksmiths, the gold and silver smiths, the needle makers, the locksmiths, the weapon smiths, etc. These guilds were formed to provide their members with a decent standard of living by controlling competition, and on the other hand controlling the quality of the products as well. There was a severe training programme and subsequently a controlled career programme: apprentice —> Journeyman —> master.

In 1165 a canal was dug which connected the city of Utrecht with the river Vecht, and Utrecht became a very important town with a sea harbour (the present Muiden harbour) before Amsterdam was founded. Perhaps the most important fact in the guilds history in Utrecht was the so-called "Battle of the Golden Spurs" in 1302, where the French noblemen and their army were beaten by an army of farmers and tradesmen. After their victory this Belgian army marched through the lowlands to Utrecht. They forced the bishop to give up all his worldly powers by the so-called guild-letter of 1304 and installed a city council consisting of representatives of the guilds.

In those days the city of Utrecht (20.000 inhabitants) was divided into four guild-quarters. The guilds possessed political, juridical and military power. That is why everybody had to participate and all inhabitants were obliged to be a member of one of the 21 guilds. The administration of the city was thus organised: Every guild had 2 aldermen. These 42 men nominated 24 persons in the city council. The council nominated 12 sheriffs for administration of justice. The president of these sheriffs was one of the 2 burgomasters. The city council itself nominated a second burgomaster. This system lasted till the emperor Charles V took back all power in Utrecht. In one way the blacksmiths' guild formed an example to the others, especially in the care it lavished upon its members who were old or infirm. A hospice was established on this very spot in Utrecht in 1440. The blacksmiths' hospital was devoted to their patron Saint Eligius (St. Eloy in Dutch).

The very place of this house is also historical. Utrecht, the second oldest town in the Netherlands, was founded in 48 by the Romans (as Traiectum), being the most northern fortress of their emperor. This fortress was situated on the spot where we see now the Dom tower and the Dom cathedral. In the neighbourhood, high sands in et land, were pubs and shops. In 1798 Napoleon abolished the guilds. The blacksmiths' guild however cleverly changed itself into the Blacksmith Trade Organisation and is in this way the only surviving institution of its kind in the Netherlands. In 1817 all the guest houses lost their hospital function, but this house remained and still is a charitable institution which forms an independent existence until today. The governors of the house, called regenten, adapt to the demands of present times, continue charitable work and take care of funding for maintenance of the building, the art collection and completion of the archives.

== Hospice today ==
The members, still divided into apprentices, brothers and regents, meet every week on Monday to talk, have a drink, play cards and play kolf. In this sense it is a social club.

== Charity ==
=== Brothers ===
There must always have been a strong feeling of mutual solidarity in the St. Eloy Guild of Smiths. The members were brothers to each other in more than name alone. They decided to found a hospice where old and poverty-stricken smiths and their widows could be lodged and cared for, thus lightening the burden of their declining years. The hospice was the first of its kind and can be seen as the forerunner of mutual medical insurance and funeral insurance in the Netherlands. In 1440 the Guild bought a property in the Boterstraat in Utrecht, and today, five and a half centuries later, it is still there and is known as St. Eloy's Hospice (St. Eloyen Gasthuis).

=== Adriaan Willemszoon van Dashorst ===
The Guild of Smiths seems to have been a rich guild, mainly in consequence of an inheritance from Brother Adriaan Willemszoon van Dashorst in 1571. A special additional clause in the will allowed for the distribution of bread and some money on Sundays to twenty upright poor guild brothers or other paupers, and that in perpetuity.

=== Charity today ===
The last will of Van Dashorst is still being respected today. Twenty upright poor, selected in consultation with several social services, received till 1962 each quarter a book of coupons which they can exchange at the baker's for one loaf per person per week. Nowadays the poor of Utrecht can still get gifts of the guild.

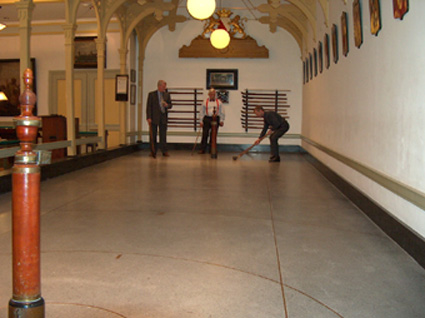
Kolf court in St. Eloy's Hospice in Utrecht

== Kolven ==
The Guild of Smiths is full of traditions. One of them is the attachment of the governing body to 'kolf', a game played with wooden or sajet balls, lapped with felt or leather, and heavy curved bats, called klieken.

The hospice has a kolf court, now roofed over, which is more than 250 years old. Since its last restoration it is a really beautiful sight, with the court marked out in brass inlay in the floor.

By the 18th century, when the kolf court was purchased, kolf (then an outdoor sport) had become so popular that courts were to be found throughout the land. Every little village had one, while a city like Utrecht had as many as twenty (in 1700).

In 1730 the Governors of St. Eloy's Hospice made the decision to buy a court which lay directly behind the hospice, an event that is planned to be commemorated in 2010 following the 280th anniversary.
