= Kolf =

Dutch game

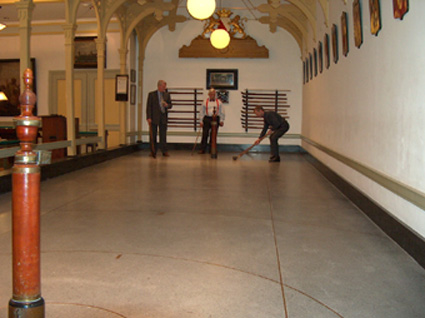
A Kolf court in St. Eloy's Hospice in Utrecht

Kolf (noun) or kolven (verb) is a game originating from the Netherlands. The game is played by four people who hit the ball over a certain distance. The first people to reach their opponents' starting point win. Games can last multiple days. It is often seen as a variant or early version of golf.

== Game ==
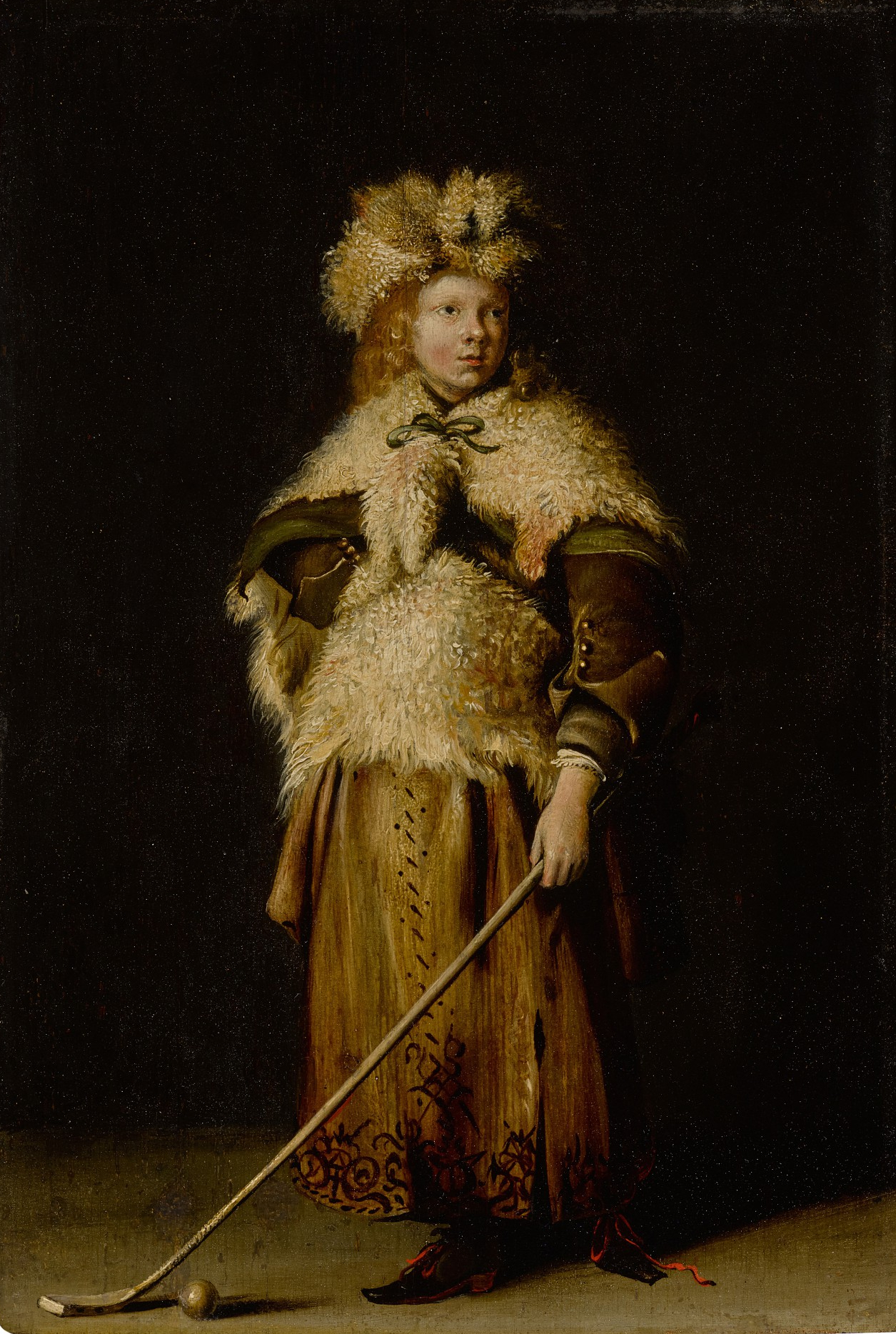
Moses ter Borch holding a kolf stick

Kolf is played on an indoor course measuring 17.5 metres (57 ft) long and 5 metres (16 ft) wide. The course is marked with looping scoring lines and features an ornate wooden post at each end. In modern days a Kolf court is made from a type of plastic which is precisely leveled.

There are three players in a match and each has their own ball. The balls are quite large and are made either of rubber or sajet (wool covered with leather). The rubber balls are the most popular, although they have to be at least 80–100 years old before they are fully mature. The older the rubber gets, the less spring it has; this in turn encourages a better roll which is what is desired in Kolf.

The Kolf club, known as a kliek (the Dutch term for the club), has a very strong wooden shaft and a heavy metal head. Sajet balls and rubber balls require the use of different size clubs; the head on rubber ball club is larger than that used for the sajetball club. This is because the rubber ball is slightly larger and heavier than the sajet ball.

The aim of the game is to hit the ball across the court three times from one end to the other, each time hitting the post at the opposite end. So a player starts at the starting end and aims to hit the post at the scoring end, then reverses play to hit the ball from the scoring end post back to starting end post and finally one more shot across the court from the starting post to the scoring post. The idea is to use just three strokes; one for each length of the court. The posts are set at an angle of 85% towards each other, so that the balls don’t jump when they hit the posts.

In playing the game, the player often makes use of rebounds on the walls of the court, similar to billiards. The closer the ball finishes to the end wall, the higher the player's score. In a tournament, players play a total of 15 games, each game consisting of 3 shots. Usually 5 games are played in succession, the winner being the player with the highest total of points.

Every player is placed in one of five classes according to their skill. Lower classes are sometimes given the advantage of extra points, so they can compete on an even basis with a player from a higher class. Clubs play against each other, and there is also a national championship every year. Since 1966, women play as well.

The method of hitting the ball is different for each player. Players generally crouch low and adopt a wide stance, with the hands quite far apart on the kliek. During the stroke, the head of the kliek never leaves the ground. It is of the utmost importance that the player keeps his body extremely still. No special clothing is worn, and players wear normal street shoes.

Kolf is often played accompanied by jenever or a cigar. There are currently 31 clubs and only 14 courses, compared with the hundreds that existed before. Of the courses still in use, all but one are in the tiny villages of the part of the North Holland province. In the old days, they were invariably attached to cafés or social centres. Less than 1,000 people out of the Netherlands' population of 16 million, about 350 men and 250 women, play Kolf.

== History ==
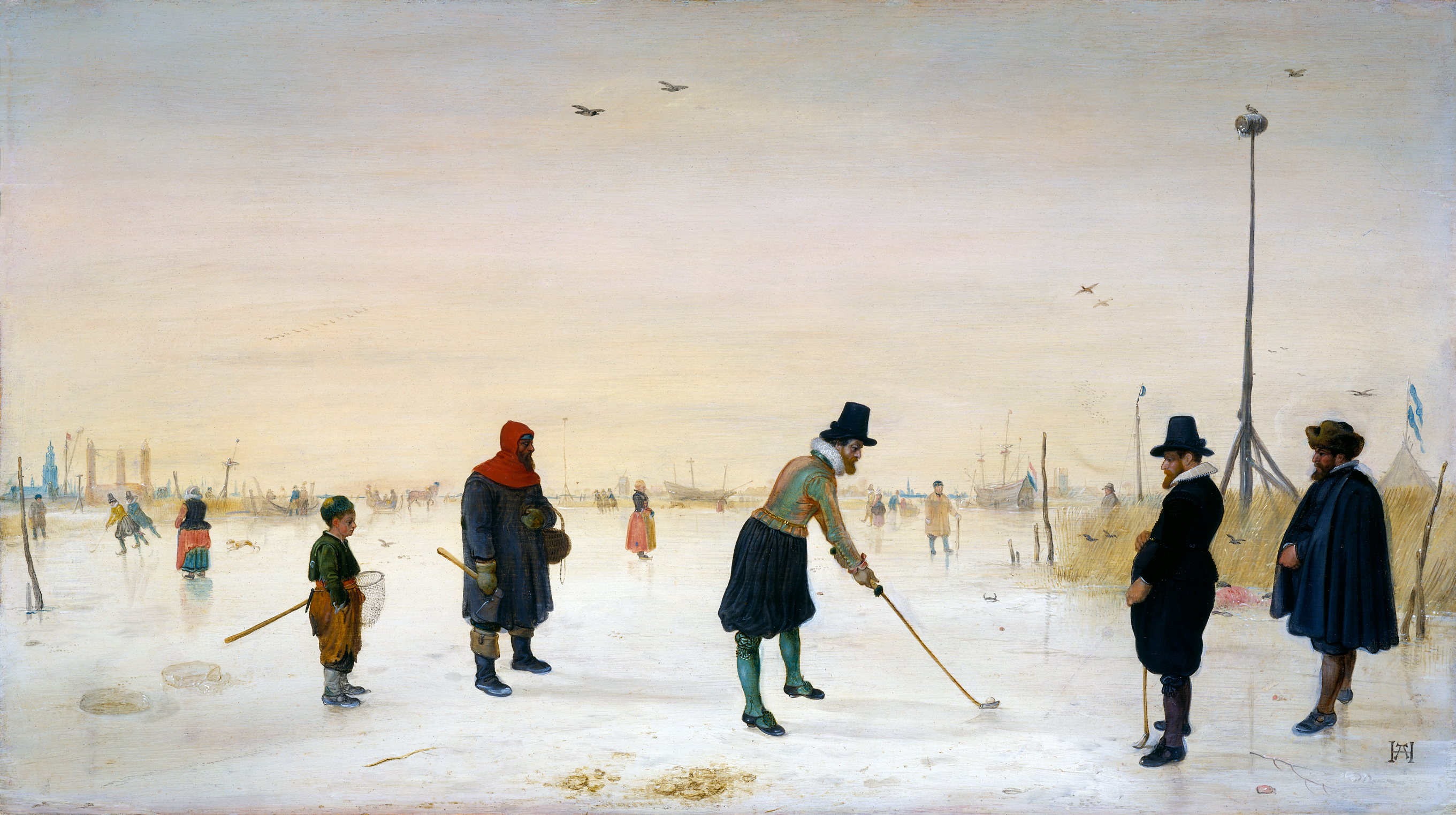
Kolf Players on Ice, Hendrick Avercamp (1625)

The history of kolf reaches beyond reliable written records, though it is believed by many to be tied to the development of golf. Documents as far back as the year 1200 mention four popular games involving both club and ball: chole in Belgium and France, jeu de mail in France, and beugelen and the Klosbaan in the Netherlands.

- Chole was probably the closest to modern golf. It was played with iron-headed clubs and a wooden ball, and the aim was to reach a given target in the minimum number of strokes.
- Jeu de mail was not dissimilar, except that it was played with a metal hammer. It could be played on a course, but the most popular form was mail a la chicane, which went cross country.
- The two Dutch sports, beugelen and the klosbaan, both involved hitting the ball through a narrow gap on the course. Beugelen still survives, in fact, and can be seen in the southern Dutch province of Limburg.

In the interchange of fashion and trade, all these games tended to spill across to neighboring regions. The Netherlands developed its own version of jeu de mail, which it called maliespel, about the same time as the English court set up a mail course on the wide avenue now known as Pall Mail (i.e. pallemaille).

But it was a combination of jeu de mail and chole which seems to have appealed most to the sporting instincts of the Dutch. They called the new game colf, and within a few years they had become a nation of passionate players. The game was played in the streets, in public squares, or anywhere there was sufficient space. Sometimes the players set up a pole which they could use as a target, other times they simply picked a handy local landmark. The winner was the one who reached the chosen point in the minimum number of strokes.

The cost of all this sporting activity, mainly in broken windows, was not welcomed by the authorities. Indeed, the best indication of the sport's widespread popularity is the number of official ordinances which were made against it. In Amsterdam, for instance, colf players were banned from the long and narrow street known as the Nes, under penalty of having their cloth confiscated. In 1456 they were banned from playing around and inside the church at Naarden. In many other cities and towns they were relegated to playing outside municipal limits. In winter, at least, the problem was less severe - when the canals and lakes froze over, many Dutch colf players took to the ice, finding an ideal playing surface and all the space they needed. The game was often featured in frozen river scenes in paintings.

At some time during the Middle Ages, the colf craze seems to have travelled across the North Sea to the Netherlands' neighbouring trading partner, Scotland. While the Scots rightly claim to have invented the modern game of golf, the origins of the game that was to become golf were brought to Scotland by Scots merchants who had traded in the Low Countries. The game was brought to St Andrews from Hanseatic ports where colf was commonly played at the time. The Dutch sport was adapted to local conditions whereby it came to be played on what were termed 'links' in the Scots language. Links is a descriptive term for coastal sandy grasslands. The term has since become almost synonymous with the modern golf course, thanks to the Scots.

Oddly, while Scotland was developing its own interpretation of colf as a spacious outdoor game, which would eventually morph into the modern game of golf, the Dutch were doing exactly the opposite with colf. Instead of playing in the open, more and more were adapting the game to a form that could be played on the old maliespel courses, which mostly adjoined taverns and inns. Increasingly, the courses were roofed over until finally, the new game was entirely played indoors. Thus was born the unique Dutch game of kolf.

From the beginning of the 18th century, the game caught on quickly. Records show that by 1769 there were about 200 courses in Amsterdam alone of which more than 30 were covered. In 1792, there were 350 courses in the whole of the Netherlands, almost half of them covered.

Initially, players used the same sticks as they had for colf, with bails made of tightly-wound wool, covered with leather. However, as kolf developed, a larger ball came into use that was more suitable for the new form of the game, and the sticks became correspondingly heavier.

A major technical breakthrough came when balls made of gutta-percha, an early form of rubber, were introduced. Those balls were larger still, the gutta-percha softer and less resilient than the rubber of today. They were used in addition to the wool-and-leather balls, rather than replacing them.

No one is certain why kolf swiftly began to fade in popularity towards the end of the 19th century. There was competition from newer sports such as soccer and cycling, of course, but a more likely reason seems to be that the cafe owners who operated most of the courses found that they were no longer economical. One by one, the courses fell into disuse, and the space was used otherwise. Now many old cafés' dance floors or billiard tables hide what once was a kolf course.

Of the 14 courses still in use, all but one are in the tiny villages of the northern part of North Holland. The one course found outside North Holland is in Utrecht, in the St. Eloyen Gasthuis (St. Eloy's Hospice). The beautiful course is the oldest in the Netherlands; although it has been restored more than once, its history dates back to 1730. The Gasthuis (or old hospice) is a building owned by the city’s ancient guild of metalsmiths.

An obstacle encountered with a sport as old as kolf is obtaining the proper equipment. There are a few craftsmen who still make the special metal-headed klieks used to play but almost none who manufacture balls of the right material or quality needed for the sport. Fortunately, the manufacture of the surviving equipment is excellent, and the life of both the sticks and balls is long. Most modern players use equipment that has been passed from father to son or friend to friend, or is borrowed from a club. Some players make their own wool-cored balls, or restore old ones which have already given many years' service. Most of the leather balls in use are at least 80 years old, which makes them true sporting antiques; the trouble is that modern rubber balls bounce too much for the kolf course, making for a less traditional experience.
