= Billy McConnell (footballer) =

Irish footballer and cricketer

Personal information
- Full name: William Henry McConnell
- Date of birth: 2 September 1901
- Place of birth: Corbolis, Ireland
- Date of death: 1974 (aged 72–73)
- Place of death: Slough, England
- Height: 5 ft 8 in (1.73 m)
- Position: Left back

Youth career
- 1920–1921: Slough YMCA

Senior career*
Years	Team	Apps	(Gls)
1921–1922	Slough Town		
1922–1923	Arsenal	0	(0)
1924–1928	Reading	142	(1)
- Slough Town

International career
1925–1928	Ireland (IFA)	8	(0)
- * Club domestic league appearances and goals

William Henry McConnell (2 September 1901 – 1974), sometimes known as Pat McConnell, was an Irish professional footballer who made over 140 appearances in the Football League for Reading and was capped by Ireland at international level. He later served as a Football League linesman and played cricket for Berkshire.

== Personal life ==
Born in Corbolis, County Louth, Ireland, McConnell moved to Slough, England at the age of four. After retiring from football, he ran a newsagent in Slough.

== Honours ==
Reading

- Football League Third Division South: 1925–26

Individual

- Reading Hall of Fame
