= Jeu de mail =

Italian historic mallet lawn game

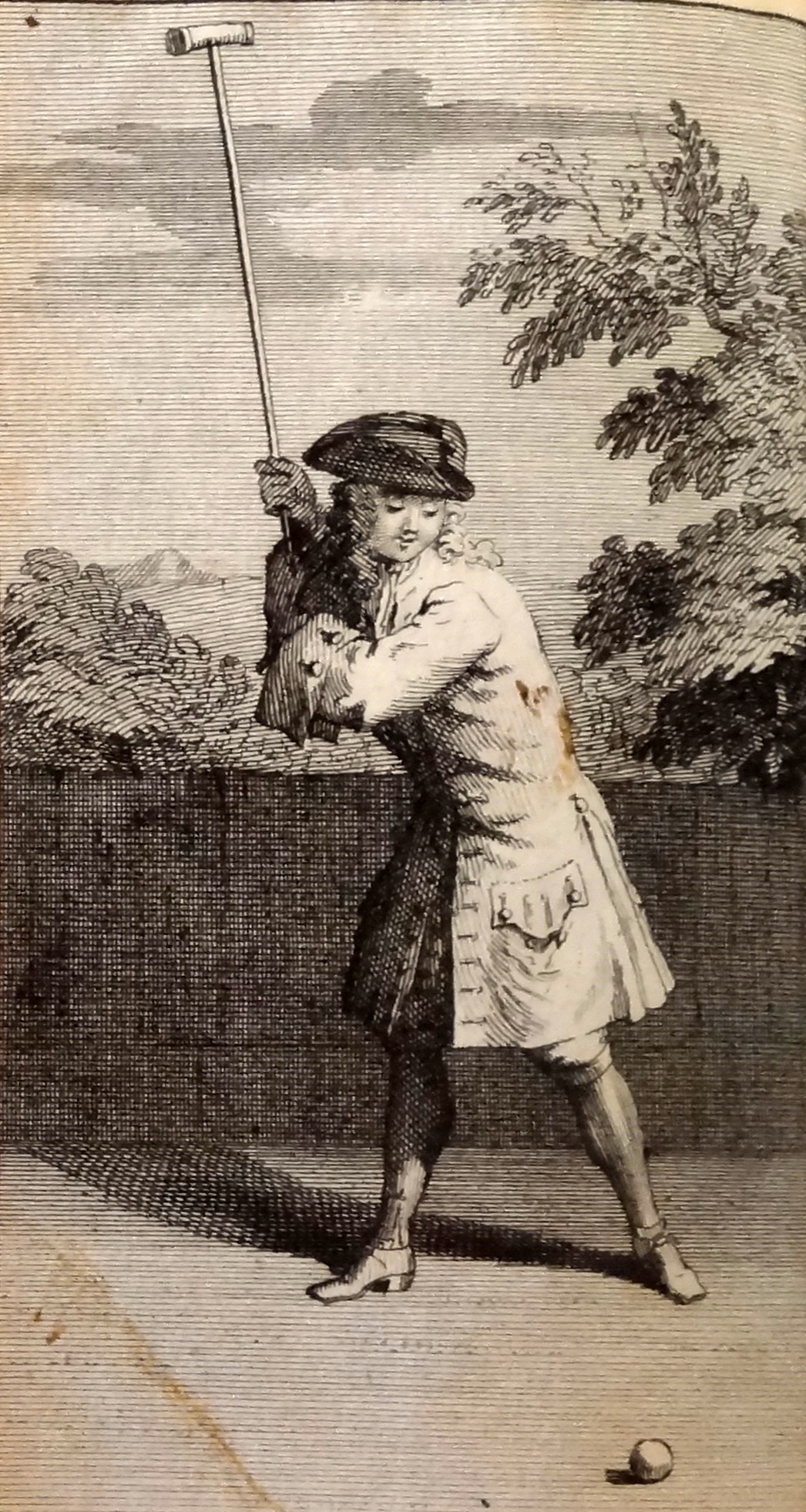
An illustration from Joseph Lauthier's Nouvelles Règles pour le jeu de mail (1717)

Jeu de mail or jeu de maille ('pallamaglio' in Italian, Middle French for 'mallet game', or sometimes interpreted as 'straw game') is an ancient outdoor game, originally from Naples, which gave rise to numerous modern sports, such as golf, croquet, hockey and its variations, and polo. It is a now-obsolete lawn game originating in the Late Middle Ages and mostly played in the Kingdom of Naples and France, surviving in some locales into the 20th century. It is a form of ground billiards, using one or more balls, a stick with a mallet-like head, and usually featuring one or more targets such as hoops or holes. Jeu de mail was ancestral to the games golf, palle-malle and croquet, and (by moving it indoors and playing on a table with smaller equipment), billiards.

== History ==
One of the oldest references to the game of 'pallamaglio', and to its Neapolitan origin, is by Anton Francesco Grazzini, also known as Lasca. The game is also mentioned in a list of Neapolitan popular games in Giordano Bruno's comedy The Candlestick (1582). The game was probably already played in the Kingdom of Naples in the twelfth century. One of the first known written record of jeu de mail is a Renaissance Latin text dating to 1416. The mail in the name probably means 'maul, mallet', from Latin malleus. An alternative meaning of 'straw' has been suggested (Modern French maille), on the basis that the target hoops used in some versions of the game were sometimes made of bound straw.

Quite popular in various forms in the Kingdom of Naples, then in other parts of Italy and France in the Late Middle Ages and Renaissance, the game developed into pall-mall in the early modern period, which spread to Scotland then England; this, in turn, eventually led to croquet.

According to Brantôme, King Henry II of France (ruled 1547–1559) was an excellent player of jeu de mail and jeu de paume (a form of handball that eventually developed into tennis and other racquet sports). Louis XIV (ruled 1661–1715), who hated jeu de paume, was on the other hand enthusiastic about jeu de mail, and the playing court in the gardens of Tuileries Palace was enlarged during his reign.

The game was still played in France, in the areas of Montpellier and Aix-en-Provence, into the early 20th century, before the First World War. An educational institution in Montpellier, Collège Jeu de Mail, still bears the name of this game.

== Game play ==
The game makes use of one or more balls that are generally of boxwood, but higher-quality balls are of medlar. The ball is struck with a long stick with a mallet- or foot-like end, similar to a croquet mallet or golf club, respectively; it is essentially a heavy version of the billiard mace (which eventually developed into the cue stick). Different variants of the game may have differing goals or targets (if any), ranging from croquet-like hoops to golf-like holes in the ground. There are four known named rules variations of the game:

- Chicane ('quarrel', 'quibble') – similar to golf; the winner is the one who reaches a distant goal in the fewest strokes.
- Grand coup ('great blow') – the goal is to launch the ball as far as possible; good players might exceed 200 yards (180 m)
- Rouët ('wheel', modern French: roue) – played with several balls; ancestral to croquet and billiards
- Partie ('party') – a team version.
