= William McConnell (illustrator) =

English illustrator and cartoonist (1833–1867)

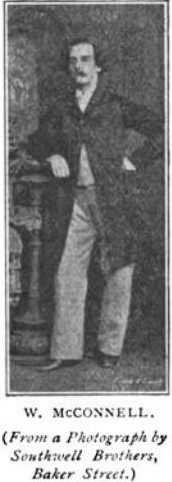
W. McConnell

William McConnell (1833–1867) was an English illustrator and cartoonist. He became known as a young man as a draughtsman on wood of illustrations, he became an official 'Punch' cartoonist in 1852. Suffering from poor health, he was supported in his last days by brother artists, and died of consumption in London on 14 May 1867.

== Works ==
Early works were the illustrations to Oliver Oldfellow's Our School (1857), George Frederick Pardon's The Months (1858), and George Augustus Sala's popular Twice Round the Clock. Upside Down, or Turnover Traits, with verses by Thomas Hood the younger, was published after his death from his initial illustrations.

== Notes ==
Attribution

This article incorporates text from a publication now in the public domain: Lee, Sidney, ed. (1893). "McConnell, William". Dictionary of National Biography. Vol. 35. London: Smith, Elder & Co.
