= Morton Goldberg =

American pool player

Personal information
- Born: December 17, 1916 Rochester, New York, U.S.
- Died: February 22, 1996 (aged 79)

Sport
- Sport: Pool, Billiards

Morton Goldberg (December 17, 1916 – February 22, 1996), also known as Larry Johnson, was an American professional pool player. Born in Rochester, New York, Goldberg beat famous pool players as Minnesota Fats, Irving Crane, and Willie Munson

== Biography ==
Morton Goldberg was born in Rochester, New York in 1916. Goldberg joined the US Army in 1942 when he was 25 years old. At the time of his enlistment, he was the New York State billiard champion, a title he had held for several years, having defeated some of the top players, including Willie Mosconi, Jimmy Caras, Ralph Greenleaf, Irving Crane, and Erwin Rudolph. For much of his service time, he was stationed in Boston. When he wasn't cooking for the troops, he played pool. Goldberg beat famous pool players as Minnesota Fats, Irving Crane, and Willie Mosconi. At the height of five feet two inches, Goldberg overcame his lack of height by becoming extremely adept at using a mechanical bridge.

In Boston, Pfc. Goldberg met Willie Hoppe (the world's champion billiard player) for a second time—Goldberg had lost to Hoppe at an exhibition in Poughkeepsie in 1939. The two provided an exhibition of billiard skill, held at Fort Heath. The match was one between champions, both expert in the game.

== Titles ==
- 1965 Johnston City One Pocket Championship
- 1966 Stardust Open One Pocket Championship
- 1967 Johnston City One Pocket Championship
- 1967 Columbus 14.1 Championship
- 1967 Capital Q 3-Cushion Open
- 1968 Johnston City One Pocket Championship
- 1969 BCA U.S. Open 3-Cushion Championship
- 1970 BCA U.S. Open 3-Cushion Championship
- 1971 Silver Cue 3-Cushion Billiard Open
- 1972 Johnston City One Pocket Championship
- 1972 Johnston City Nine-Ball Championship
- 1972 Johnston City All-Around Championship
- 1973 Stardust Open Eight-Ball Championship
- 1973 Stardust Open All-Around Championship
- 1973 New England 14.1 Championship
- 1975 Hi-Cue 3-Cushion Open
- 1975 Massachusetts One Pocket Championship
- 1976 Challenge 3-Cushion Tournament
- 1976 New England 14.1 Championship
- 1976 US Open 3-Cushion Championship
- 1977 Big Apple 3-Cushion Tournament
- 1978 Las Vegas 3-Cushion Tournament
- 1978 New York 3-Cushion Tournament
- 1980 Billiard News National Open 3-Cushion
- 1985 Resorts International Last Call For 9-Ball Seniors
- 1988 Boston 9-Ball Open
- 1994 New England Pool and Billiards Hall of Fame
- 1999 Billiard Congress of America Hall of Fame
- 2004 One Pocket Hall of Fame
