= Cisero Murphy =

American pool player, born 1935

Cicero Murphy
Personal information
- Born: 1935 Minersville, Pennsylvania, U.S
- Died: 1996

Pool career
- Country: United States
- Turned pro: 1953

Tournament wins
- World Champion: Straight Pool (1965)

Cisero Murphy (1935–1996) was an American professional pool player. Murphy was the first African-American professional pocket billiards player to ever win world and U.S. national titles. He is also one of two players to win the World Straight Pool Championship on his first attempt, the other being Ray Martin who won the title in 1971.

Murphy was capable of running 200 balls, missing a shot, then running another 200. He would do it with one of the more unusual strokes in billiards history, coming to a dead stop at the back of his stroke. Murphy described it as "a one- or two-second hiccup," which allowed him to take a picture of the shot before committing to it. It was so uncommon that billiards fans gave it a name: the "hesitation stroke."

== Career ==
Cisero Murphy grew up in the Bedford-Stuyvesant section of Brooklyn, one of eight children. His father left the family home when Murphy was a child, forcing his mother to go on welfare. At 15, he was a high school dropout. One summer, however, young Cisero began playing pool at the Police Athletic League (PAL), and except for short-term jobs, he continued playing pool for the duration of his life.

He became city champion in 1953 and state champion in 1958. From 1959 to 1964, he was eastern state champion in the PAL. Later in life, Murphy participated in city programs in an effort to help young adults and children, such as Billiards in the Streets, which was sponsored by the Department of Parks and Recreation. He also would visit veterans hospitals, senior citizen homes, and mental hospitals giving trick shot exhibitions and teaching people how to play pool.

He won the New York City championship at age sixteen, and when he was in his twenties, he won the Eastern States 14.1 Championship six straight times. Because he was African American in an era when there were racial tensions in the United States, Murphy was not invited to compete in world title events until 1965 despite his skills as a player. Many other African Americans who were not accepted in the world title events avoided confrontation due to intimidation. Murphy won the Burbank World Invitational 14.1 tournament in 1965, defeating white players such as Joe Balsis, Jimmy Moore, and Luther Lassiter. Pool players picketed outside the front of the now-defunct Commodore Hotel in Midtown Manhattan, which was the site of the 1964 Billiard Room Propriety Association of America tournament, to protest Murphy's exclusion. The next year he competed in the Burbank World Invitational 14.1 tournament against top-flight competition, and was defeated by Luther Lassiter in the finals.

Some people have compared Cisero Murphy to Major League Baseball's Jackie Robinson, breaking the racial barriers (including the baseball color line) in sports. Murphy was inducted into the Billiard Congress of America Hall of Fame 1995. Cisero Murphy at the time the only players in the history of pocket billiards competition to win a world title on his first attempt. He continued to place near the top in straight pool events during the 1960s and during his career, he had high runs over 250 balls.

After taking the title, Murphy was officially in the upper echelon of players. According to Ebony magazine, he earned $8,000 in 1965 and figured to double that number the following year — and he padded his income by giving exhibitions for $150 a day.

In the Flatbush neighborhood of New York City, there is a mural painted of Cisero Murphy shooting pool, along with fellow New Yorkers and baseball players Joe DiMaggio and Mike Piazza and Joseph "Cyclops" Bouie III.

== Titles ==
- 1953 New York 14.1 Championship
- 1959 Eastern States 14.1 Championship
- 1960 Eastern States 14.1 Championship
- 1961 Eastern States 14.1 Championship
- 1962 Eastern States 14.1 Championship
- 1963 Eastern States 14.1 Championship
- 1964 Eastern States 14.1 Championship
- 1965 BRPAA World Straight Pool Championship
- 1966 Stardust Open Straight Pool Championship
- 1969 Maine State 14.1 Championship
- 1972 Maine State 14.1 Championship
- 1973 Michigan State 14.1 Championship
- 1973 U.S. Masters Straight Pool Championship
- 1995 Billiard Congress of America Hall of Fame
