= Luther Lassiter =

American pool player (1918–1988)

Personal information
- Nickname: "Wimpy"
- Born: November 5, 1918 Elizabeth City, North Carolina, U.S.
- Died: October 25, 1988 (aged 69) Elizabeth City

Pool career
- Country: United States
- Turned pro: 1953

Tournament wins
- World Champion: Straight Pool (1963, 1963, 1964, 1966, 1966, 1967, 1967)

Luther Clement Lassiter Jr. (November 5, 1918 – October 25, 1988), nicknamed Wimpy, was an American pool player from Elizabeth City, North Carolina. The winner of seven world pocket billiard championships and numerous other titles, Lassiter is most well known for his wizardry in the game of nine-ball and is widely considered one of the greatest players in history, He was inducted into the Billiard Congress of America's Hall of Fame in 1983. That same year, he was also inducted into the North Carolina Sports Hall of Fame. He was ranked number 9 on the Billiards Digest 50 Greatest Players of the Century.

== Early life ==
In his youth, Lassiter showed signs of uncanny hand-eye coordination, both in the areas of pool and baseball. In sandlot baseball games, Lassiter was an ace pitcher. According to his friends, who affectionately referred to him as "Bud", he was the player everyone wanted on his team. Lassiter's younger brother, Clarence, spoke of his brother's ability to pitch: "Coach was always trying to sign him up. You know, Bud could pitch a ball. But by then, pool had caught him and he didn't care about the athletic end of things. The coach pestered him and pestered him and tried to get him to play, because he had a natural talent for baseball. But he didn't use it; he was trapped by pool."

Queried on the subject of his pitching, Lassiter himself said, "Oh, sure, I played some baseball. In fact, it was at some little old ball game that I once ate twelve hot dogs and drank thirteen Cokes and Orange Crushes, and everybody fell to calling me Wimpy" (after the J. Wellington Wimpy character of the Popeye comic strip who loved to eat hamburgers). Instead of baseball, Lassiter focused on pool, developing his game at City Billiards in Elizabeth City. The owner of the pool room there, a man named Speedy Ives, allowed Lassiter to enter through the back door and to shoot whenever he wanted as long as Lassiter swept the floors and cleaned the pool tables.

As a young man, Lassiter became afflicted with a condition which he termed "the swolls"; it would follow him throughout his life. This was a condition in which Lassiter's lips would puff up and become red and swollen when an attractive member of the opposite sex approached him with affection. This peculiarity first appeared in the early 1940s when Lassiter was in Norfolk, Virginia.

Rudolf "Minnesota Fats" Wanderone remembered his friend's condition well: "[Lassiter's] lips would be all puffed up and at first I thought it was from wiping off the lipstick. But there was nothing he could do about it, so he finally gave up on tomatoes across the board by remaining a bachelor. Evelyn told Wimpy he should fall in love and get married, but Wimpy would always say, 'Bless you, Mrs. Wanderone, but I'm already in love – I'm in love with pool.' And he really was."

== Hustler days ==
During the early 1940s, following his discharge from the Coast Guard, Lassiter's main running buddy was Wanderone. Their town of preference was Norfolk, Virginia, which was known at the time as the highest-rolling place for pool hustlers, card players, and gamblers in general. During these years, Lassiter became the "undisputed king" of the pool hustlers, reportedly winning hundreds of thousands of dollars from gambling on pool games between 1942 and 1948 (including $15,000 in a single week). He often accepted money games involving extraordinary sums, often around $1,000 a game. It was during this time that he developed his confidence and skill necessary to begin competing on the professional level with the greatest pocket-billiard masters of the day, including Willie Mosconi and Irving Crane.

After the sudden decline of the gambling action in Norfolk around 1948, Lassiter was forced to begin competing professionally in pool tournaments held across the country. His first major tournament was the World Straight Pool Championships in 1953 held in San Francisco's Downtown Bowl; the player who knocked him out – and who would go on to win the tournament and then the world title – was Willie Mosconi.

It was also during this time that Lassiter formed a partnership with Don Willis, a player who – while never having won any world titles because he never competed in any of the tournaments – had beaten some of pool's greatest players, including Jimmy Moore, Ralph Greenleaf, and Willie Mosconi, all in straight pool. In 1948, Willis beat Lassiter in nine-ball on Lassiter's home turf, Elizabeth City; it was Lassiter's best game. Indeed, Willis' talent for nine-ball was the primary reason for Lassiter forming a partnership with Willis rather than a rivalry. Together they would go on the road and hustle pool rooms, sometimes winning anywhere from $5,000 to $10,000 over a period of several days.

== Challenge matches ==
In the nineteenth century and up through the mid-1960s, a common way for world billiards titles to change hands was by a challenge match, meaning a challenge was issued to a championship titleholder accompanied by stake money held by a third party. One of Lassiter's successful defences of his title at the World Straight Pool Championship was in 1966 against Cisero Murphy which was one of the last title challenge matches in billiards. At that match Lassiter showed his talent at sharking—that is, performing some act with the intent of distracting the opponent. Reportedly, Murphy was on a great and long run of balls. In response, Lassiter pretended to fall asleep. When Murphy noticed Lassiter sleeping he promptly missed. Lassiter, who was wide awake, jumped out of his chair and ran out the match for the win.

== Later years ==
After his official retirement from pool in 1975, Lassiter continued to play in some low-profile tournaments, but due to years of hard living while on the road and marathon gambling sessions that would last into the early hours of the morning, he often was not able to play quite as well as he had in his younger days. Even so, many pool players during those years claim he was still one of the greatest players alive, and a force to be reckoned with on the pool table. Lassiter did come out of retirement, along with many other pool greats, to compete twice in "The Legendary Stars of Pocket Billiards Tournament", once in January 1982 at Harrah's Marina Hotel and Casino in Atlantic City, and again in 1983, at the Claridge Hotel and Casino, also in Atlantic City. The players who competed in the 1982 tournament were Lassiter, Joe Balsis, Babe Cranfield, Jimmy Moore, U. J. Puckett, Irving Crane, Minnesota Fats, and Willie Mosconi. In 1983, the line-up was the same minus Balsis and Cranfield, and with Jimmy Caras added. These were round-robin tournaments, in which each player would be matched against the others in a single match, with each playing the same number of matches, and receiving a set number of points for each match won. Each match consisted of one seven-ball set, race to four games, one nine-ball set, race to four games, and in the event of a tie, one eight-ball set, best two out of three games. At the 1983 tournament, which was televised on the then-fledgling ESPN network, Luther Lassiter pitched a shutout. He won all six of his matches for 20 points each, amassing a perfect score of 120 points and the first-place prize of $10,000. After Lassiter defeated Willie Mosconi to put the exclamation point on the tournament, commentator for the match Allen Hopkins remarked to co-commentator Chris Berman, "This is no surprise to me; Wimpy's a great nine-ball player. I watched him play, and he looked like the young Wimpy, from years back. He played great. The way he played this tournament he could have beat anybody, including [today's top players]." After defeating U. J. Puckett earlier in the same tournament, Lassiter said in response to Berman's praise of his playing, "Well, I'm the youngest and I'm still lucky."

When another hall of famer, Ed Kelly, was asked who was the toughest player he ever played against, he responded that it depended on the game but that if it was nine-ball, "it would have to be Luther Lassiter .... Wimpy was the best .... He was the best shot-maker that I ever saw."

Luther Lassiter spent his final days in financial trouble, living alone in the house of his childhood in Elizabeth City, on a pension provided by oil tycoon Walter Davis, who was a lifelong friend of Lassiter's. When they were children during the Great Depression, Lassiter would give Davis, who came from a poor farming family, a couple of dollars whenever he needed it, which often meant the difference between eating and not eating. Davis never forgot Lassiter's kindness, and repaid him by taking care of his necessities in his last years. To escape his loneliness, Lassiter would often ride his bicycle a couple of blocks away to the home of his younger brother Clarence and wife Barbara, to and hang out and play with their two sons.

On October 25, 1988, Lassiter died of natural causes in his hometown of Elizabeth City, North Carolina. He was found by his nephew next to his pool table where he had apparently been practicing.

Clarence's wife, Barbara, said after his death: "I knew two or three people in my life who I thought would go to heaven – with no doubt – and [Wimpy] was one of them. He treated everybody like they was supposed to be treated."

== Publications ==
Lassiter authored a two books on the sport:

- The Modern Guide to Pocket Billiards; New York: Fleet Publishing (1964); ISBN 0-8303-0008-2.
- Billiards for Everyone; New York: Grosset & Dunlap (1965); ISBN 0-448-01519-6.

== Titles and achievements ==
- 1954 National Straight Pool Tournament
- 1956 US Pocket Billiards Tournament
- 1958 National Championship Challenge
- 1962 Johnston City Nine-ball Championship
- 1962 Johnston City Straight Pool Championship
- 1962 Johnston City All-Around Championship
- 1963 Johnston City Nine-ball Championship
- 1963 Johnston City Straight Pool Championship
- 1963 Johnston City All-Around Championship
- 1963 BRPAA World Straight Pool Championship
- 1963 BRPAA World Straight Pool Championship
- 1963 Tampa, Florida Straight Pool Championship
- 1963 Tampa, Florida Nine-ball Championship
- 1964 Johnston City Nine-ball Championship
- 1964 Johnston City Straight Pool Championship
- 1964 BRPAA World Straight Pool Championship
- 1966 BRPAA World Straight Pool Championship
- 1966 National Invitational Championship
- 1966 International Invitational Championship
- 1966 BRPAA World Straight Pool Championship
- 1967 Long Beach International Open Tournament
- 1967 Virginia Pocket Billiards Tournament
- 1967 Johnston City Nine-ball Championship
- 1967 Johnston City All-Around Championship
- 1967 BRPAA World Straight Pool Championship
- 1967 BRPAA World Straight Pool Championship
- 1968 Madison Cue Classic Tournament
- 1969 Johnston City One-Pocket Championship
- 1969 Johnston City Nine-ball Championship
- 1969 Johnston City All-Around Championship
- 1969 BCA U.S. Open Straight Pool Championship
- 1969 National Invitational 9-Ball Championship
- 1970 Johnston City Straight Pool Championship
- 1970 U.S. Masters 9-Ball Championship
- 1971 Johnston City Straight Pool Championship
- 1971 Stardust Open Nine-ball Championship
- 1971 Stardust Open All-Around Championship
- 1971 National Billiards News Achievement Award
- 1983 ESPN Legends of Pocket Billiards Tournament
- 1983 North Carolina Sports Hall of Fame
- 1983 Billiard Congress of America Hall of Fame
- 1999 Billiards Digest 9th Greatest Player of the Century
