= Steve Mizerak =

American pool player (1944–2006)

Personal information
- Nickname: "The Miz"
- Born: October 12, 1944 Perth Amboy, New Jersey, U.S.
- Died: May 29, 2006 (aged 61) Boca Raton, Florida, U.S.

Pool career
- Country: United States
- Turned pro: 1964
- Best finish: Quarter finals 1990 WPA World Nine-ball Championship

Tournament wins
- Other titles: 80
- World Champion: Straight Pool (1982, 1983)

Stephen Mizerak Jr. (October 12, 1944 – May 29, 2006) was an American pool player, who was born in Perth Amboy, New Jersey. Mizerak is considered one of the best straight pool players of all time, dominant in the game during the 1970s, winning over 70 tournaments during his career. Mizerak won the World Straight Pool Championship twice, including a record 4 consecutive BCA U.S. Open Straight Pool Championship titles. Nicknamed "the Miz", (Note: Steve Mizerak's nickname "The Miz" does not mean anything. It is basically a shortening of his surname.) he had a high run of 421 balls.

== Career ==
Mizerak, a lefty, began playing pool under the guidance of his father, who for many years had been the New Jersey State Champion. Mizerak's father opened a pool hall in Metuchen. There, Mizerak played billiards for the first time at the age of 4. At the age of 5, Mizerak trained for hours every day before doing his first exhibitions at the age of 6. By the age of 11 he had already run 50 balls at straight pool, and 100 by the age of 13. At 15 he won the Perth Amboy City Championship. The next year he was refused entry into that event; they said he was too good. Numerous observers and players predicted a golden future for Mizerak, and he was already being compared to Willie Mosconi. In 1965, when Mizerak was 20 years, old he qualified for the World Straight Pool Championship, where he shocked the pool world by defeating top players like Irving Crane, Luther Lassiter, and Joe Balsis. The 1960s saw a decline for the World Straight Pool Championship, as the era of the Hustlers in the Johnston City Championship was growing. By this point in his life, Mizerak decided it would not be possible to earn a living playing pool full time and went on to attend Athens College in Athens, Alabama. After some time at Saint Ambrose University in Davenport, Iowa, Mizerak graduated from Athens College with a degree in education, history, and psychology in 1967. He then took a position as a history and geography teacher at a secondary school in Perth Amboy, New Jersey, where he taught for 13 years.

Mizerak became famous outside of pool circles after appearing in a humorous commercial for Miller Lite beer in 1978, in which he executed three complicated shots (which took more than 100 "takes"), then proclaimed that you can "really work up a thirst, even when you're just showing off." Due to his fame as a result of this commercial, in 1980 Mizerak quit his job as a teacher to further promote Miller Lite in billiards demonstrations at trade shows, while continuing on the tournament circuit. He did another dozen or so Miller Lite ads over the next decade.

These advertisements helped popularize pool, and Mizerak himself became well known nationally. He was invited to exhibitions regularly. However, Mizerak struggled in competitions because of his busy schedule of exhibitions promoting Miller Lite. Mizerak by this time had established himself as one of the best players in the world, winning the BCA U.S. Open Straight Pool Championship four years in a row, a record which still stands. In 1979 Mizerak once again proved his dominance by winning the U.S. Open 9-ball Championship, defeating Jim Rempe in the finals and going undefeated in the tournament. In the 1970s Mizerak had 40 professional tournament victories, more that any other player that decade. Due to this Mizerak was inducted into the Billiard Congress of America Hall of Fame in 1980. At the time Mizerak was the youngest player ever to receive this honour.

In the 1980s, Mizerak was still very active as an advertising face, which is why he was able to focus on the actual game to a limited extent. In 1986 he had a guest role in the film The Color of Money. Mizerak won back-to-back World Straight Pool Championship titles in 1982 and 1983, and multiple nine-ball tournaments throughout the 1980s. After that, however, in the 90s weight problems prevented him from winning other big titles, even though he continued to actively play in tournaments and win smaller events. He reached a major final in 1989 and competed in his 5th final of the U.S. Open Straight Pool Championship, although falling short to German champion Oliver Ortmann. In the mid 90s Mizerak had settled in Florida where he founded the senior tour for professional billiards players in 1996. He owned a Florida-based company that sold billiards equipment, ran a billiards parlor in Lake Park, Fla., and wrote instructional books, one of them titled "Just Showin' Off."

== Snooker venture ==
In 1978, Mizerak became the first American-born player to compete in a professional Snooker event. He competed in the 1978 Canadian Open, Mizerak won his first match, including an 81 break, but lost to Tony Knowles by 9 frames to 7.

Mizerak also played in a series of snooker and pool challenge matches from 1974 to 1990 – televised examples of Mizerak playing snooker – against the top snooker players in the world: John Spencer, Steve Davis, Jimmy White, Joe Johnson and Stephen Hendry. The competitions were a best of Snooker & various Pool games; this meant that Mizerak was a slight favourite due to his opponents' unfamiliarity with Pool and his slight knowledge of Snooker.

In 1974, Mizerak competed against John Spencer in Snooker and Straight Pool. He won all 3 frames of Straight Pool and unexpectedly won 2 of the 3 frames in Snooker to win the overall competition.

In 1987, Mizerak competed against Steve Davis, this time in snooker, straight pool and nine-ball. Despite losing heavily to Davis by 4 frames to 1 in snooker, Mizerak won both in straight pool and nine-ball to be the overall winner, which earned him $50,000 for his victory, which was the largest first place prize a pool player had won at the time. In the following years, he competed against Jimmy White in 1988, Joe Johnson in 1989 and Stephen Hendry in 1990. Mizerak again lost against all three opponents in snooker but won both in straight pool and eight-ball, to be undefeated in the overall title.

Mizerak turned professional in 1988 and competed in the World Snooker Championship in 1988 and 1989, but failed to progress beyond the first round of qualifying on both occasions, losing to low-ranked snooker professionals. In 1988, he lost 10 frames to 2 to Anthony Harris, and the following year was beaten by 10 frames to 1 by Mark Rowling, before giving up on his snooker ambitions.

== Later life ==
Mizerak owned and operated pool halls in the West Palm Beach-Lake Park, Florida area during the 1990s and 2000s. He founded the Senior Tour in 1996 for players over 50, which held around 5 or 6 tournaments a year, and offered guaranteed prize money of $25,000 to $50,000. The tour's home was at a billiard hall he opened in Lake Park called Steve Mizerak's Billiards.

Mizerak suffered from obesity during the later part of his adult life, weighing over 400 lbs by the end of his career. He suffered a series of strokes, the first in 2001 at the age of 56, which left him with physical challenges that prevented him from playing pool competitively, subsequently retiring from competition.

In 1999, he was ranked number 6 among the Billiards Digest "50 Greatest Players of the Century" and ranked 2nd "Greatest Living Player of the Century".

== Death ==
Mizerak died on May 29, 2006, at the age of 61, in Boca Raton, Florida, due to complications stemming from gallbladder surgery. He was survived by his wife Karen, two sons, a stepson and two grandchildren.

== Career titles ==
- 1964 New Jersey State 14.1 Championship
- 1966 Indiana State 14.1 Championship
- 1967 New Jersey State 14.1 Championship
- 1967 Hi-Cue Challenge 14.1 Championship
- 1968 New Jersey State 14.1 Championship
- 1969 Salt Lake City 14.1 Championship
- 1969 Stardust Open Straight Pool Championship
- 1968 New Jersey State 14.1 Championship
- 1970 BCA U.S. Open Straight Pool Championship
- 1970 New Jersey State 14.1 Championship
- 1970 U.S. Masters Straight Pool Championship
- 1971 Michigan Open 14.1 Championship
- 1971 BCA U.S. Open Straight Pool Championship
- 1971 U.S. Masters 9-Ball Championship
- 1971 U.S. Masters All-Around Championship
- 1972 New Jersey State 14.1 Championship
- 1972 Michigan Open 14.1 Championship
- 1972 BCA U.S. Open Straight Pool Championship
- 1973 New Jersey State 14.1 Championship
- 1973 Michigan Open 14.1 Championship
- 1973 Kentucky Classic 14.1 Championship
- 1973 BCA U.S. Open Straight Pool Championship
- 1973 Eastern States Classic 14.1 Championship
- 1973 Kingston Invitational 14.1 Championship
- 1973 U.S. Masters 9-Ball Championship
- 1974 New Jersey State 14.1 Championship
- 1974 U.S. Masters Straight Pool Championship
- 1974 Pabst-Brunswick Straight Pool Championship
- 1974 Florida State 14.1 Championship
- 1974 Ohio State 14.1 Championship
- 1974 Snooker-Pool Challenge Match vs. (John Spencer)
- 1974 Billiard News National Open 14.1
- 1975 Pabst-Brunswick Straight Pool Championship
- 1975 Empire State Open 14.1 Championship
- 1976 U.S. Masters Straight Pool Championship
- 1976 Perth Amboy Open 14.1 Championship
- 1976 Empire Billiard Open 9-Ball
- 1976 Hi-Cue Straight Pool Open
- 1976 Billiard News National Open 14.1
- 1977 St Louis Open 9-Ball
- 1977 World Series of Pool
- 1977 New Jersey State Open 9-Ball
- 1977 New York State Open 14.1
- 1978 St Louis Open 9-Ball
- 1978 New York State Open 9-Ball
- 1978 U.S. Masters Straight Pool Championship
- 1978 Michigan Open 9-Ball
- 1979 U.S. Open 9-Ball Championship
- 1980 Baltimore Bullet 9-Ball Invitational
- 1980 England 14.1 Challenge Cup
- 1980 Billiard Congress of America Hall of Fame
- 1980 Eastern State Open 9-Ball
- 1982 PPPA World Straight Pool Championship
- 1982 Eastern State Straight Pool
- 1982 Florida Open 9-Ball
- 1983 PPPA World Straight Pool Championship
- 1983 Houston Red's Open 9-Ball
- 1983 Billiards Digest Players of the Year
- 1986 Cue Garden Open 9-Ball
- 1987 Snooker-Pool Challenge Match vs. (Steve Davis)
- 1988 Snooker-Pool Challenge Match vs. (Jimmy White)
- 1988 U.S. Invitational 14.1 Championship
- 1989 Florida Open 9-Ball
- 1989 Lexington Mini Open 9-Ball
- 1989 Snooker-Pool Challenge Match vs. (Joe Johnson)
- 1990 Snooker-Pool Challenge Match vs. (Stephen Hendry)
- 1991 Southern California Open 9-Ball
- 1997 Senior Tour Grand Casino Classic
- 1997 Florida State 9-Ball
- 1998 Camel 9-Ball Shootout Scotch Doubles - with (Jeanette Lee)
- 1999 Camel 9-Ball Shootout Scotch Doubles - with (Ming Ng)
- 1999 Billiards Digest 2nd Greatest Living Player of the Century

== Filmography ==
- 1978 Miller Lite Beer Commercial
- 1980 The Baltimore Bullet
- 1984 Late Night with David Letterman
- 1986 The Color of Money
- 1989 Pool The Masters Way
- 1994 Pocket Billiards Fundamentals To Fantasticks
- 2000 The Art of Billiards

== Notes ==
Preceded by Allen Hopkins	US Open Nine-ball Champion; 1979	Succeeded by Jim Rempe
