= Maturo =

Maturo is a surname. Notable people with the surname include:

- August Maturo (born 2007), American actor
- Joseph A. Maturo Jr. (born c. 1951), American politician
- James Maturo (c. 1878–?), American billiards champion
- Roberto Drago Maturo (born 1951), Peruvian footballer and manager

== See also ==
- Maduro
