= Frank Taberski =

American pool player (1889–1941)

Personal information
- Nickname: "The Gray Fox"
- Born: 1889 Schenectady, New York, U.S.
- Died: 1941 (aged 51–52)

Pool career
- Country: United States
- Turned pro: 1915

Tournament wins
- World Champion: Straight Pool 14x

Frank Taberski (1889–1941) was an American professional pocket billiards player from Schenectady, New York. Nicknamed "the Gray Fox," he won 14 world titles.

== Early life ==
Taberski was born in 1889, and first made a living by selling milk door to door. He began practicing pool at 13 years of age, playing 30 minutes a day when his working hours were over.

== Career ==
In 1915, at age 26, he turned pro after attending the New York City pocket billiards championship.

In 1916, he became world champion by defeating Johnny Layton. Also in 1916, he retained his title by defeating Ralph Greenleaf. In 1917, he retained his title again by defeating James Maturo.

By 1918, he had won 10 consecutive challenge matches. Following those victories, Taberski temporarily retired that same year.

He returned to pocket billiards in 1925 and regained the world title from Greenleaf who held it over 10 challenge matches in a row.

His highest straight pool run is 238.

== Death and legacy ==
Taberski died in 1941. He was 52. Taberski was inducted into the Billiard Congress of America Hall of Fame in 1975.

His son Harold Taberski was also a pool player.

== Titles & achievements ==
- 1916 World Straight Pool Championship
- 1916 World Straight Pool Championship
- 1916 World Straight Pool Championship
- 1917 World Straight Pool Championship
- 1917 World Straight Pool Championship
- 1917 World Straight Pool Championship
- 1917 World Straight Pool Championship
- 1917 World Straight Pool Championship
- 1917 World Straight Pool Championship
- 1918 World Straight Pool Championship
- 1921 14.1 Record High Run. 200 Consecutive Balls
- 1925 National Straight Pool Championship
- 1927 NBAA World Straight Pool Championship
- 1927 NBAA World Straight Pool Championship
- 1928 NBAA World Straight Pool Championship
- 1928 NBAA World Straight Pool Championship
- 1975 Billiard Congress of America Hall of Fame

Preceded by Johnny Layton	World Straight Pool Champion (Pre-WPA); 1916-1918	Vacant Title next held by Ralph Greenleaf
Preceded by Ralph Greenleaf	World Straight Pool Champion (Pre-WPA); 1925-1926	Vacant Title next held by Ralph Greenleaf
Preceded by Ralph Greenleaf	World Straight Pool Champion (Pre-WPA); 1927-1928	Succeeded by Ralph Greenleaf
