= Larry Lisciotti =

American pool player (born 1946)

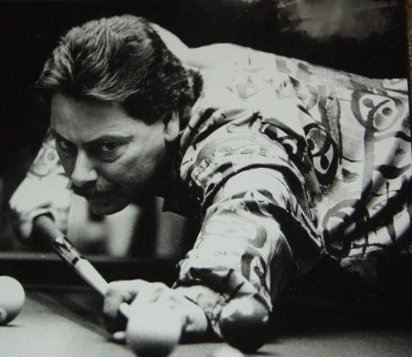

Personal information
- Nickname: "The Prince of Pool"
- Born: 26 December 1946 Keene, New Hampshire, U.S.
- Died: 9 February 2004 (aged 57)

Pool career
- Country: United States

Tournament wins
- World Champion: Straight Pool (1976)

Larry Lisciotti (December 26, 1946 – February 9, 2004), nicknamed "the Prince of Pool", was an American pool player and road hustler from Keene, New Hampshire.

== Early days ==
Lisciotti had eaten up the local action before he graduated from high school, but as soon as he obtained a high school diploma, he hit the road. He remembered it as the best time of his life, as there were times when he spent only US$6 on a motel room, but won thousands of dollars in a local tavern.

As a road player in the early 1970s in Charlotte, North Carolina, Lisciotti was playing nine-ball with an unknown entity for $15,000 for six-ahead (meaning one player had to score six games ahead, instead of a race to six) in order to win the money. Out of the corner of his eye, he saw a black, shiny object pointing directly at his head as he was getting ready to shoot the nine-ball in the pocket. He missed the shot, as the bullet flew over his head. It happened five more times, each time Lisciotti was getting ready to shoot a game-winning shot. After missing six consecutive nine-ball shots in a row, Lisciotti had had enough and said, "If he's going to kill me, let him!" He fired the last nine-ball in the pocket with authority, but thankfully only heard a clicking sound as the gunman ran out of bullets.

== Professional career ==
Lisciotti defeated Rich Riggie in a 14.1 challenge match at Gold Crown Billiards in New London, Connecticut in 1971. Behind by 150 points, Lisciotti rallied with a run of 113 to win the match, 1000–908, before a packed house of spectators.

In 1976, at the Tournament of Champions, Tom Jennings, the winner of the BCA U.S. Open Straight Pool Championship, held by the Billiard Congress of America, agreed to battle it out with Lisciotti for the top spot. The two players played straight pool, 1,000-point catch-up at 200 points per block for five nights, in a much publicized winner-take-all $10,000 challenge match. The last night, Lisciotti made a 125-ball run to bring his score to 999, one point away from victory. Tension in the air, Jennings made a 57 ball run trying to catch Lisciotti, but undercut a break ball, allowing Lisciotti to pocket one ball for the win.

The September 1976 issue of Hustler Magazine profiled Lisciotti's life as a professional player and gambler. The article was written by Jay Levin, entitled, "Larry Lisciotti, Pool Hustler".

== Death ==
Lisciotti died of cancer in 2004.

== Titles ==
- 1974 Scarborough Open 14.1 Championship
- 1974 Family Billiards 14.1 Open
- 1976 Sunshine State Open 9-Ball
- 1976 PPPA World Straight Pool Championship
- 1980 Atlantic City 9-Ball Invitational
- 1988 Connecticut Open 9-Ball
- 1990 Ocean State 14.1 Open
- 1991 Stamford Open 9-Ball
- 1994 Stamford Open 9-Ball

== Filmography ==
Billiards: The Basics and the Best, Key Media Aspen Studio, featuring Larry Lisciotti, Mike Sigel, Jimmy Mataya, and Jim Rempe.
