= World Straight Pool Championship =

Annual pool competition in the United States

The World Straight Pool Championship is a top-level competition for straight pool, also known as "14.1 continuous".

== History ==
In 1910, Jerome Keough invented straight pool as a way to increase the challenge over previous continuous games. Soon after the new rules were adopted for world championship play. The championship was the most prestigious pool tournament until the late 20th century, when the game of Nine-ball surpassed straight pool as the most prominent game for professional players. Other straight pool tournaments which are still held annually such as the American 14.1 Straight Pool Championship and the European Pool Championship 14.1, have gained prominence in recent years.

In 1948, Ruth McGinnis became the first woman to enter the event. On August 6, 1978, Jean Balukas became the first woman to qualify to play in the men's division of the event (she had also qualified in the women's division.) The event was held on August 12 of that year at the Biltmore Hotel located at 43rd Street and Madison Avenue in New York City.

The event was revived in 2006, in part to restore straight pool's popularity in the United States. The World Straight Pool Championship was sanctioned by the World Pool-Billiard Association (WPA) in 2006, 2007, 2008, and 2010. The tournament continued unsanctioned from 2011 to 2019.

Ralph Greenleaf and Willie Mosconi are the most successful players having both won the tournament on 19 occasions. The oldest player to win the tournament is Irving Crane at 59 years old at the time of his victory. The youngest player to win the tournament is Ralph Greenleaf at 20 years old at the time of his first victory.

== Format ==
In the most recent format of the tournament, all 64 players are divided into 8 groups where they play in round-robin format. Each match in this round is a race to 100 points. The leading 4 players in each group proceed to the next round.

The games of the last-32 round are played in double-elimination format until 16 players remain. Matches are extended to races to 150 points.

The games in the last-16 round are played in single-elimination format, and matches are extended, to races to 200 points. The finals match is further extended to a race to 300 points (with a half-hour break occurring when a player reaches 150).

== Winners ==
Sanctioned World Championship events

No sanctioning body (1912 to 1920)
NBAA – National Billiard Association of America (1921 to 1940)
BAA – Billiard Association of America (1941 to 1947)
BCA – Billiard Congress of America (1948 to 1974)
BRPAA – Billiard Room Proprietors Association of America (1963 to 1969)
PPPA – Professional Pool Players Association (1976 to 1986)
PBA – Professional Billiards Association (1988 to 1990)
WPA – World Pool-Billiards Association (2006 to 2010)

=== World Straight Pool Championship ===
Year	Winner	Runner-up
1912	(United States) Edward Ralph	(United States) James Maturo
1912	(United States) Edward Ralph	(Cuba) Alfredo De Oro
1912	(Cuba) Alfredo De Oro	(United States) Edward Ralph
1912	(Cuba) Alfredo De Oro	(United States) Frank Sherman
1913	(Cuba) Alfredo De Oro	(United States) James Maturo
1913	(Cuba) Alfredo De Oro	(United States) Thomas Hueston
1913	(United States) Bennie Allen	(Cuba) Alfredo De Oro
1913	(United States) Bennie Allen	(United States) Charles Weston
1914	(United States) Bennie Allen	(United States) James Maturo
1914	(United States) Bennie Allen	(United States) Edward Ralph
1914	(United States) Bennie Allen	(United States) Ray Pratt
1914	(United States) Bennie Allen	(United States) James Maturo
1916	(United States) Emmett Blankenship	(United States) Johnny Layton
1916	(United States) Johnny Layton	(United States) Emmett Blankenship
1916	(United States) Frank Taberski	(United States) Johnny Layton
1916	(United States) Frank Taberski	(United States) Ralph Greenleaf
1916	(United States) Frank Taberski	(United States) Edward Ralph
1917	(United States) Frank Taberski	(United States) James Maturo
1917	(United States) Frank Taberski	(United States) Louis Kreuter
1917	(United States) Frank Taberski	(United States) Bennie Allen
1917	(United States) Frank Taberski	(United States) Larry Stoutenberg
1917	(United States) Frank Taberski	(United States) Joseph Concannon
1917	(United States) Frank Taberski	(United States) Louis Kreuter
1918	(United States) Frank Taberski	(United States) Ralph Greenleaf
1919	(United States) Ralph Greenleaf	(United States) Bennie Allen
1920	(United States) Ralph Greenleaf	(United States) Arthur Woods
1921	(United States) Ralph Greenleaf	(United States) Arthur Woods
1922	(United States) Ralph Greenleaf	(United States) Thomas Hueston
1922	(United States) Ralph Greenleaf	(United States) Walter Franklin
1922	(United States) Ralph Greenleaf	(United States) Bennie Allen
1922	(United States) Ralph Greenleaf	(United States) Arthur Church
1923	(United States) Ralph Greenleaf	(United States) Thomas Hueston
1924	(United States) Ralph Greenleaf	(United States) Bennie Allen
1926	(United States) Ralph Greenleaf	(United States) Erwin Rudolph
1927	(United States) Erwin Rudolph	(United States) Ralph Greenleaf
1927	(United States) Erwin Rudolph	(United States) Harry Oswald
1927	(United States) Thomas Hueston	(United States) Erwin Rudolph
1927	(United States) Frank Taberski	(United States) Thomas Hueston
1927	(United States) Frank Taberski	(United States) Pasquale Natalie
1928	(United States) Frank Taberski	(United States) Arthur Woods
1928	(United States) Ralph Greenleaf	(United States) Andrew Jean
1928	(United States) Frank Taberski	(United States) Ralph Greenleaf
1929	(United States) Ralph Greenleaf	(United States) Erwin Rudolph
1930	(United States) Erwin Rudolph	(United States) Ralph Greenleaf
1931	(United States) Ralph Greenleaf	(United States) George Kelly
1932	(United States) Ralph Greenleaf	(United States) Jimmy Caras
1933	(United States) Ralph Greenleaf	(United States) Andrew Ponzi
1933	(United States) Erwin Rudolph	(United States) Andrew Ponzi
1934	(United States) Andrew Ponzi	(United States) Erwin Rudolph
1935	(United States) Jimmy Caras	(United States) Erwin Rudolph
1936	(United States) Jimmy Caras	(United States) Erwin Rudolph
1937	(United States) Ralph Greenleaf	(United States) Andrew Ponzi
1937	(United States) Ralph Greenleaf	(United States) Irving Crane
1938	(United States) Jimmy Caras	(United States) Andrew Ponzi
1940	(United States) Andrew Ponzi	(United States) Jimmy Caras
1941	(United States) Willie Mosconi	(United States) Andrew Ponzi
1941	(United States) Erwin Rudolph	(United States) Irving Crane
1942	(United States) Irving Crane	(United States) Erwin Rudolph
1942	(United States) Willie Mosconi	(United States) Andrew Ponzi
1943	(United States) Andrew Ponzi	(United States) Willie Mosconi
1943	(United States) Andrew Ponzi	(United States) Irving Crane
1944	(United States) Willie Mosconi	(United States) Andrew Ponzi
1945	(United States) Willie Mosconi	(United States) Ralph Greenleaf
1946	(United States) Willie Mosconi	(United States) Jimmy Caras
1946	(United States) Willie Mosconi	(United States) Irving Crane
1946	(United States) Irving Crane	(United States) Willie Mosconi
1947	(United States) Willie Mosconi	(United States) Irving Crane
1947	(United States) Willie Mosconi	(United States) Jimmy Caras
1948	(United States) Willie Mosconi	(United States) Andrew Ponzi
1949	(United States) Jimmy Caras	(United States) Willie Mosconi
1950	(United States) Willie Mosconi	(United States) Irving Crane
1951	(United States) Willie Mosconi	(United States) Irving Crane
1952	(United States) Willie Mosconi	(United States) Irving Crane
1953	(United States) Willie Mosconi	(United States) Joseph Procita
1954	(United States) Willie Mosconi	(United States) Joseph Procita
1955	(United States) Irving Crane	(United States) Willie Mosconi
1955	(United States) Willie Mosconi	(United States) Irving Crane
1956	(United States) Willie Mosconi	(United States) Jimmy Caras
1956	(United States) Willie Mosconi	(United States) Irving Crane
1963	(United States) Luther Lassiter	(United States) Jimmy Moore
1964	(United States) Luther Lassiter	(United States) Arthur Cranfield
1964	(United States) Arthur Cranfield	(United States) Luther Lassiter
1965	(United States) Cisero Murphy	(United States) Luther Lassiter
1965	(United States) Joe Balsis	(United States) Jimmy Moore
1966	(United States) Luther Lassiter	(United States) Cisero Murphy
1966	(United States) Joe Balsis	(United States) Willie Mosconi
1966	(United States) Luther Lassiter	(United States) Cisero Murphy
1967	(United States) Luther Lassiter	(United States) Jack Breit
1968	(United States) Irving Crane	(United States) Luther Lassiter
1969	(United States) Ed Kelly	(United States) Cisero Murphy
1970	(United States) Irving Crane	(United States) Steve Mizerak
1971	(United States) Ray Martin	(United States) Joe Balsis
1972	(United States) Irving Crane	(United States) Lou Butera
1973	(United States) Lou Butera	(United States) Irving Crane
1974	(United States) Ray Martin	(United States) Allen Hopkins
1976	(United States) Larry Lisciotti	(United States) Steve Mizerak
1977	(United States) Allen Hopkins	(United States) Peter Margo
1978	(United States) Ray Martin	(United States) Allen Hopkins
1979	(United States) Mike Sigel	(United States) Joe Balsis
1980	(United States) Nick Varner	(United States) Mike Sigel
1981	(United States) Mike Sigel	(United States) Nick Varner
1982	(United States) Steve Mizerak	(United States) Danny DiLiberto
1983	(United States) Steve Mizerak	(United States) Jimmy Fusco
1986	(United States) Nick Varner	(United States) Allen Hopkins
1988	(United States) Mike Sigel	(United States) Allen Hopkins
1990	(United States) Bobby Hunter	(United States) Ray Martin
Not held from 1991 to 2005
2006	(Germany) Thorsten Hohmann	(Germany) Thomas Engert
2007	(Germany) Oliver Ortmann	(Netherlands) Huidji See
2008	(Netherlands) Niels Feijen	(Philippines) Francisco Bustamante
2010	(Germany) Oliver Ortmann	(Finland) Mika Immonen

== Top performers ==
Rank	Name	Nationality	Winner
1	Ralph Greenleaf	United States	19
1	Willie Mosconi	United States	19
2	Frank Taberski	United States	14
3	Luther Lassiter	United States	7
4	Irving Crane	United States	6
4	Bennie Allen	United States	6
5	Erwin Rudolph	United States	5
5	Jimmy Caras	United States	5
6	Andrew Ponzi	United States	4
6	Alfredo de Oro	Cuba	4
7	Mike Sigel	United States	3
7	Ray Martin	United States	3
7	Joe Balsis	United States	3
8	Edward Ralph	United States	2
8	Nick Varner	United States	2
8	Oliver Ortmann	Germany	2
8	Steve Mizerak	United States	2

- In the event of identical records, players are sorted in alphabetical order by first name.

== Dragon 14.1 Tournament ==
In 2009, Dragon Promotions created the Dragon 14.1 Tournament, later known as the World 14.1 Tournament.

No sanctioning body (2009 to 2019)

Year	Winner	Runner-up
2009	(France) Stephan Cohen	(Finland) Mika Immonen
2011	(Germany) Thorsten Hohmann	(United States) Mike Davis
2012	(United States) John Schmidt	(Philippines) Efren Reyes
2013	(Germany) Thorsten Hohmann (2)	(United Kingdom) Darren Appleton
2014	(United Kingdom) Darren Appleton	(United States) Shane Van Boening
2015	(Germany) Thorsten Hohmann (3)	(United Kingdom) Darren Appleton
2016	(Finland) Mika Immonen	(United States) Earl Strickland
2017	(Philippines) Lee Vann Corteza	(Germany) Thorsten Hohmann
2018	(Germany) Thorsten Hohmann (4)	(United States) Tony Robles
2019	(United States) Shane Van Boening	(United States) Corey Deuel
