= Billiard Congress of America Hall of Fame =

Sports honor

This is the list of people inducted into the Billiard Congress of America's hall of fame to honor outstanding people who, through their competitive skills and dedication, have enriched the sport and industry. Two categories have been established in the Billiard Congress of America's Hall of Fame. The "Greatest Player" category is awarded for outstanding players who must be 40 years of age or older, have been active professionals for at least 20 years and have recorded significant achievements in national or international competition recognized by the BCA. The "Meritorious Service" category (•) is awarded for those who have made lasting, memorable and important contributions to the game or the billiards industry.

The year of induction is listed after the name.

== 1960s ==
- Ralph Greenleaf (1966)
- Willie Hoppe (1966)
- Charles C. Peterson (1966) •
- Welker Cochran (1967)
- Alfredo de Oro (1967)
- Ben Nartzik (1967) •
- Jake Schaefer Sr. (1968)
- Jake Schaefer Jr. (1968)
- Willie Mosconi (1968)
- Herman Rambow (1969) •

== 1970s ==
- Harold Worst (1970)
- John Hyatt (1971) •
- Johnny Layton (1974)
- Frank Taberski (1975)
- Jimmy Caras (1977)
- Irving Crane (1978)

== 1980s ==
- Steve Mizerak (1980)
- Dorothy Wise (1981)
- Joe Balsis (1982)
- Luther Lassiter (1983)
- Rudolph Wanderone (1984) •
- Jean Balukas (1985)
- Lou Butera (1986)
- Erwin Rudolph (1987)
- Andrew Ponzi (1988)
- Mike Sigel (1989)

== 1990s ==
- John Brunswick (1990) •
- Walter Tevis (1991) •
- Nick Varner (1992)
- Michael Phelan (1993) •
- Eddie Taylor (1993)
- Ray Martin (1994)
- Jimmy Moore (1994)
- Cisero Murphy (1995)
- Dallas West (1996)
- Arthur Cranfield (1997)
- Ruth McGinnis (1997)
- Larry Johnson (1999)

== 2000s ==
- Buddy Hall (2000)
- Robert Byrne (2001) •
- Raymond Ceulemans (2001)
- LoreeJon Ogonowski-Brown (2002)
- Jim Rempe (2002)
- Eddie Kelly (2003)
- Efren Reyes (2003)
- Ewa Laurance (2004)
- George Balabushka (2004) •
- Mike Massey (2005) •
- Robin Dodson (2005)
- Earl Strickland (2006)
- Sang Lee (2007)
- Allen Hopkins (2008)
- Pat Fleming (2008) •
- Johnny Archer (2009)
- Allison Fisher (2009)

== 2010s ==
- Francisco Bustamante (2010)
- Terry Bell (2010) •
- Larry Hubbart (2010) •
- Ralf Souquet (2011)
- Danny DiLiberto (2011)
- Karen Corr (2012)
- Jeanette Lee (2013)
- Barry Hearn (2013) •
- Jose Parica (2014)
- Mika Immonen (2014)
- Oliver Ortmann (2014)
- Charles Ursitti (2015) •
- Rodney Morris (2016)
- Belinda Calhoun (2016)
- Tom Rossman (2017) •
- Darren Appleton (2017)
- Gerda Hofstatter (2018)
- Kim Davenport (2018)
- Greg Sullivan (2019) •
- Paul Jansco (2019) •
- George Jansco (2019) •
- Alex Pagulayan (2019)

== 2020s ==
- Kelly Fisher (2020)
- Thorsten Hohmann (2021)
- Jerry Briesath (2022) •
- Dennis Orcollo (2022)
- Niels Feijen (2023)
- Mark Griffin (2024) •
- Michael Panozzo (2024) •
- Shane Van Boening (2024)
- Carlo Biado (2025)
- Corey Deuel (2026)
- Barry Behrman •(2026)
- Billy Incardona •(2026)
