= Dorothy Wise =

American pool player (1914–1995)

Personal information
- Nickname: "Cool Hand" Dorothy
- Nationality: American
- Born: Dorothy Eleanor Maxfield; December 13, 1914 Spokane, Washington, U.S.
- Died: April 12, 1995 (aged 80) Spokane, Washington, U.S.
- Spouse: Jimmy Wise

Sport
- Country: United States
- Sport: Pool
- Updated on December 24, 2025

Dorothy Wise (née Dorothy Eleanor Maxfield; December 13, 1914 – April 12, 1995) was an American professional pool player. She was born in Spokane, Washington. When she first started playing pool professionally, there were very few national tournaments for women. She won many local and state tournaments, so she called herself the world champion. The first national tournament for women happened in 1967. She won and kept winning for the next five years. She lost the title in 1972. She played in the final against 13-year-old Jean Balukas.

She became a member of the Billiard Congress of America Hall of Fame in 1981. She was the first woman to be made a member.

Dorothy learned to play pool from her husband, Jimmy Wise. He managed billiard parlors (where people play pool) in several cities around the western United States. He watched Dorothy win the first national championship in 1967, but died later that year.

Wise died of dementia in Spokane on April 12, 1995.

== Titles & Achievements ==
- 1967 California State 14.1 Championship
- 1967 BCA U.S. Open Straight Pool Championship
- 1968 BCA U.S. Open Straight Pool Championship
- 1969 BCA U.S. Open Straight Pool Championship
- 1970 BCA U.S. Open Straight Pool Championship
- 1971 BCA U.S. Open Straight Pool Championship
- 1971 National Billiard News Achievement Award
- 1980 WPBA Hall of Fame
- 1981 Billiard Congress of America Hall of Fame
