= Ruth McGinnis =

American pool player (1910–1974)

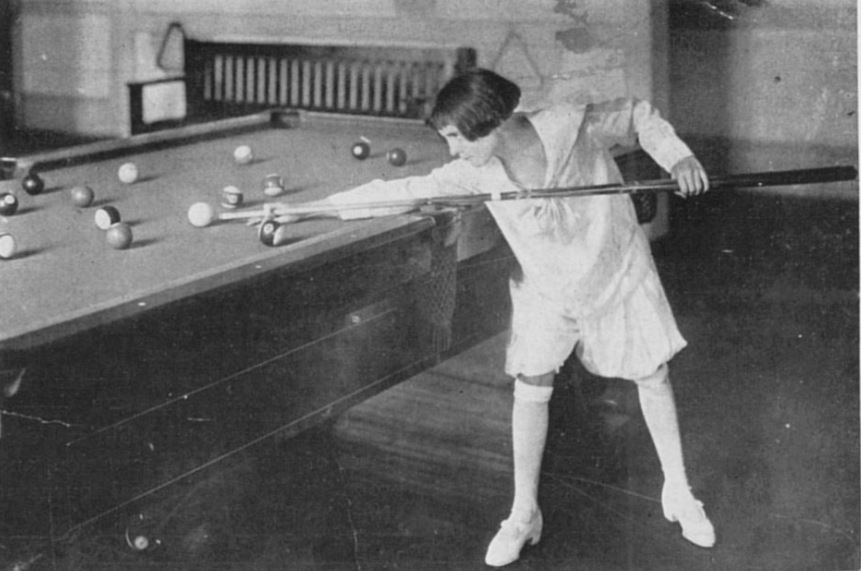
- McGinnis (circa 1924)

Personal information
- Nickname: Lefty
- Born: 1910 Honesdale, Pennsylvania, U.S.
- Died: May 16, 1974 (aged 64); Honesdale, Pennsylvania, U.S. Honesdale

Pool career
- Country: United States

Ruth McGinnis (1910 – May 16, 1974) was an American straight pool player, who is considered one of the greatest female pool players of all time.

== Early life ==
Ruth McGinnis was born in 1910 in Honesdale, Pennsylvania to Thomas and Margaret McGinnis. She was one of three sisters, and her father was a former boat captain and barber. She began playing pool at the age of 7, on pool tables in her father's barbershop on South Main Street in Honesdale. She was a prodigious player and began receiving local and national press coverage in the late 1910s. In 1922, at the age of eleven, McGinnis played Willie Mosconi in a Philadelphia pool hall exhibition match, though the contest was stopped by police as local laws prohibited minors from being in pool halls. She also played exhibition matches against Ralph Greenleaf in 1924, and was described in The Tribune as Greenleaf's protégé.

She was the captain of the varsity high school basketball team that won the Pennsylvania state championship in 1928. McGinnis scored 36 points in one game, and 341 across the 15 games in the series.

McGinnis studied to become a physical education teacher at East Stroudsbourg State Teachers College, where she also participated in a number of sports and served as a lifeguard, reportedly saving a man from drowning. She graduated in 1932, though it was difficult to find work due to the Great Depression.

== Pool career ==
After graduating from Stroudsburg, McGinnis participated in a national billiards tour program, "Better Billiards," sponsored by the National Billiard Association of America and Brunswick Billiards, and typically traveled around 28,000 miles a year. The tour was led by her former competitor, Willie Mosconi.

In 1933, Babe Didrikson, recently returned from the 1932 Summer Olympics, challenged McGinnis to a billiards competition. The pair competed in Manhattan in January 1933, with McGinnis beating Didrikson 400–62 in a six-day match. In the 1930s, she also helped create the movie Behind the Eight-Ball with Paul Douglas.

In 1942, McGinnis participated in the New York State championship, becoming the first woman to compete in a men's tournament. In 1948, she became the first woman to enter the World Straight Pool Championship.

McGinnish was widely considered the World Women's Champion in the 1930s and 1940s, despite the lack of professional tournaments for women. She played primarily in exhibition contests, rather than high paying tournaments, and had a 97% win rate and a high run of 128.

== Later life ==
McGinnis retired from the billiards profession in 1954, and went on to teach developmentally delayed students at the S.A. Douglas School in Philadelphia in the 1960s.

In 1974, at the age of 64, she died of cancer at Wayne County Memorial Hospital.

McGinnis was posthumously inducted into the Women's Professional Billiards Association Hall of Fame in 1976, and into the Billiard Congress of America Hall of Fame in 1997.

A marker commemorating McGinnis has been erected in Honesdale, Pennsylvania in 2016 by the Pennsylvania Historical and Museum Commission.
