= Andrew Ponzi =

American pool player

Personal information
- Born: 20 January 1903 Philadelphia, Pennsylvania, U.S.
- Died: 11 April 1950 (aged 47) Philadelphia, Pennsylvania, U.S.

Pool career
- Country: United States
- Turned pro: 1919
- Pool games: Straight Pool

Tournament wins
- World Champion: Four-time straight pool world champion

Andrew Ponzi (January 20, 1903 – April 11, 1950) was an American pool player and world champion.

== Biography ==
Andrew Ponzi was born Andrew D'Allesandro in Philadelphia, Pennsylvania. As a boy, he injured his right hand as a result of a trolley mishap. He went on to improve it by practicing pool.

At 16, D'Allesandro was already a skilled player who won numerous money matches. By that time, the infamous swindler, Charles Ponzi, was in the press. Thus friends gave him the nickname Ponzi.

In 1934, Ponzi won his first world pool title by defeating Erwin Rudolph.

Ponzi won the world title again in 1940 by besting Jimmy Caras.

In 1943, Ponzi won his third world championship, subduing Willie Mosconi. He won the world title for the fourth and final time by defeating Irving Crane that same year.

He suffered a heart attack while participating in a tournament in 1950. He died two weeks later at age 47.

Ponzi was inducted in the Billiard Congress of America Hall of Fame in 1988.
