= Alfredo de Oro =

Cuban pool player (1863–1948)

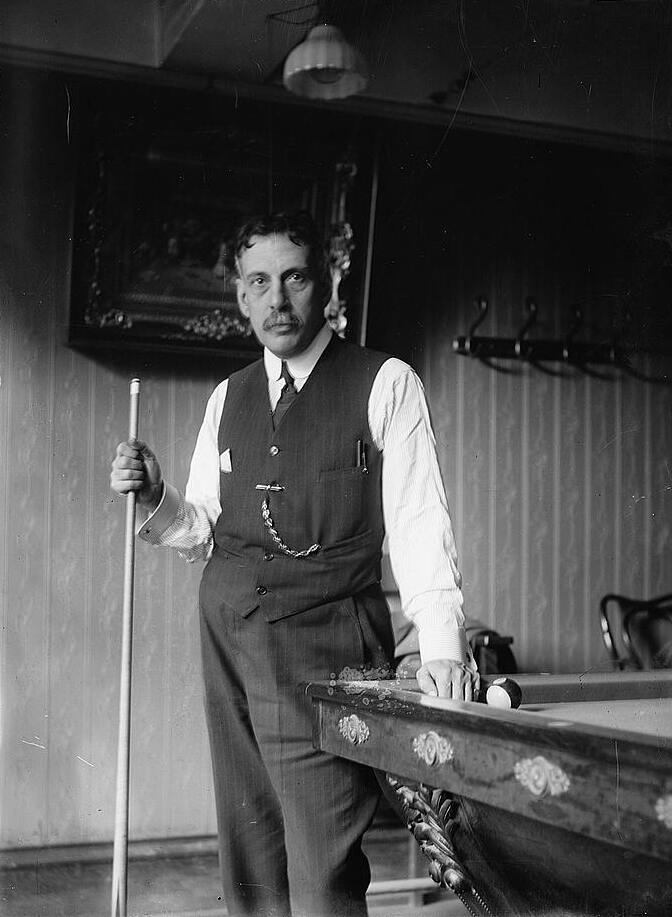
- de Oro in 1912

Personal information
- Born: 28 April 1863 Manzanillo, Cuba
- Died: 23 April 1948 (aged 84) United States

Pool career
- Country: Cuba
- Turned pro: 1887

Tournament wins
- World Champion: Continuous Pool 29x, Three-Cushion Billiards 20x, Straight Pool 4x, Fifteen-ball Pool

Alfredo de Oro (28 April 1863 – 23 April 1948) was a Cuban professional carom billiards and pool player who several times held the world title in both three-cushion billiards and straight pool simultaneously. He was posthumously inducted into the Billiard Congress of America's Hall of Fame in 1967, the first non-American to receive the honor. He was ranked number 4 on the Billiards Digest 50 Greatest Players of the Century.

== Biography ==
He was born 28 April 1863, in Manzanillo, Cuba.

His first public appearance as a professional was in the World Fifteen-ball Pool Championship, held in New York, February 1887. He won the World Continuous Pool Championship in a match against Jerome R. Keogh in New York, November 1910, making the highest recorded run of 81. In 1912 he was defeated in pocket billiards by James Maturo of Denver, Colorado, in Philadelphia by a score of 150 to 136. In 1914 he defeated Charles R. Morin in three-cushion billiards for the World Championship. De Oro was inducted into the BCA Hall of Fame in 1967.

He has been a winner of World Championships in multiple disciplines winning the World Continuous Pool Championship twenty nine time and the World Three-cushion Championship on twenty occasions.

=== Family ===
His son Alfredo de Oro Jr. was an amateur billiard player in turn, making it to the final round of the 1931 National Association of Amateur Billiard Players Championship (defeated by soon-to-be-pro Edward Lee).

== Career titles ==
- World Fifteen-ball Pool Championship (1887)
- World Continuous Pool Championship (1889–1893, 1896, 1898–1901, 1904–1905, 1908, 1910–1911)
- World Straight Pool Championship (1912–1913)
- World Three-cushion Championship (1908–1911, 1913–1919)

== In popular culture ==
Damon Runyon referenced Oro in his short story "Madame La Gimp", showing his name to be widely known in 1920s New York:

"Well, when I step in I see the judge miss a shot anybody can make blindfolded, but as soon as I give him the office I wish to speak to him, the judge hauls off and belts in every ball on the table, bingity-bing, the last shot being a bank that will make Al de Oro stop and think, because when it comes to pool, the old judge is just naturally a curly wolf."
