= Vicki Paski =

American pool player

Personal information
- Nickname: Diamond Vic
- Born: 16 October 1955 (age 70)
- Website: vickipaski.com

Pool career
- Country: United States
- Pool games: Eight-ball, Nine-ball, 14.1

Vicki Paski (born 16 October 1955) is a pool player from the United States and member of the Women's Professional Billiard Association Hall of Fame.

== Biography ==
Vicki Paski was born on 16 October 1955. She started playing pool whilst studying for a degree in business at Lansing Community College, when she took the course "Pocket Billiards 101." She continued to practice at the club where the course was held, called the Velvet Rail, and won her first tournament at the age of 18. Paski was one of the attendees at the inaugural meeting of the Women's Professional Billiard Association (WPBA) in 1976.

Her playing career included reaching two world championship finals. She was the 1979 World Nine-ball Runner-up and 1981 World 14.1 Runner-up.

Paski served as President of the WPBA, and in 1987 became the first woman pool analyst for ESPN. Her playing nickname is Diamond Vic.

She became a member of the Women's Professional Billiard Association Hall of Fame, for Meritorious Service, in 2005, and was inducted into the Greater Lansing Area Sports Hall of Fame in 2011.

== Ttitles & Achievements ==
- 1976 BCA National Amateur Championship
- 1980 All-American Trick Shot Championship
- 1982 BCA National Nine-ball Championship
- 1982 BCA National Team Eight-ball Championship
- 1982 Pool & Billiard Magazine Player of the Year
- 1983 BCA National Team Eight-ball Championship
- 2005 WPBA Hall of Fame
- 2011 Greater Lansing Area Sports Hall of Fame
