= James Maturo =

Billiards player (1878–??)

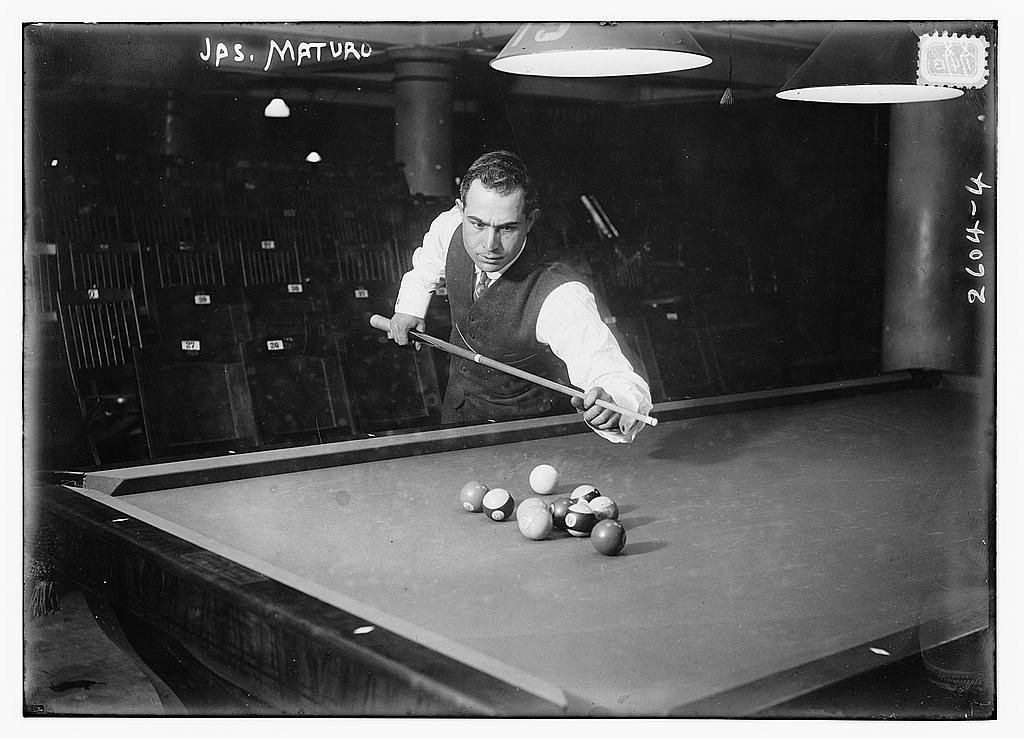

James Maturo was a 5 time World Straight Pool Championship finalist.

== Biography ==
He was born in 1878. In 1912 he defeated Alfredo de Oro by a score of 150 to 136 in Philadelphia, to play Edward Ralph in the world final match. In 1917 he was matched against Frank Taberski of Schenectady, New York in a championship match.
