= Ray Martin (pool player) =

American pool player (born 1935)

Personal information
- Nickname: "Cool Cat"
- Born: February 26, 1935 (age 91) Paterson, New Jersey, U.S.

Pool career
- Country: United States
- Best finish: Quarter finals 1994 WPA World Nine-ball Championship

Tournament wins
- World Champion: Straight Pool (1971, 1974, 1978)

Ray Martin (born February 26, 1935) is an American professional pool player, nicknamed "Cool Cat". He acquired his nickname when he calmly won a world title in 1971 in California when during the event an earthquake was in progress.

== Professional career ==
He held the World Champion title in straight pool in 1971, 1974 and 1978.

In 1994, Martin was inducted into the Billiard Congress of America's Hall of Fame.

He is a winner of three World Straight Pool Championship titles. He has also won several nine-ball tournaments, including the 1980 Lake Tahoe Invitational, the 1981 King of the Hill Pool Championship, and the 1983 Music City Open. He finished 4th and 5th, respectively in the 1992 and 1993 BCA US Opens. From 1989 to 1991 he served as a contributing editor and wrote the Nine-Ball Safeties column for The Snap Magazine.

== Titles & Achievements ==
- 1968 New Jersey State 14.1 Tournament
- 1970 New York State 14.1 Tournament
- 1971 BCA World Straight Pool Championship
- 1971 National Billiard Player of the Year
- 1972 New Jersey State 14.1 Tournament
- 1974 BCA World Straight Pool Championship
- 1978 Connecticut State 14.1 Tournament
- 1978 PPPA World Straight Pool Championship
- 1980 Atlantic City Invitational 14.1
- 1980 Lake Tahoe Invitational All-Around
- 1981 King of the Hill Pool Championship
- 1983 Music City Open 9-Ball
- 1983 Florida 9-Ball Championship
- 1992 Florida International 9-Ball Classic
- 1993 Florida Open 9-Ball
- 1994 Palm Harbour Open 9-Ball
- 1994 Billiard Congress of America Hall of Fame
- 1995 Fat Cat's 9-Ball Tournament

== Books ==
- The 99 Critical Shots in Pool (1977). Co-authored with Rosser Reeves
