= Rudolf Wanderone =

American pool player (1913–1996)

- Born: Rudolf Walter Wanderon Jr. January 19, 1913; New York City, U.S.
- Died: January 15, 1996 (aged 82); Nashville, Tennessee, U.S.
- Other names: Minnesota Fats; New York Fats; Broadway Fats; Chicago Fats; Double-Smart; Triple-Smart Fats
- Occupation: Professional pool player
- Spouse(s): Evelyn Graff, Theresa Bell

Rudolf Walter Wanderone (né Rudolf Walter Wanderon Jr.; January 19, 1913 – January 15, 1996), commonly known as Minnesota Fats, was an American professional pool player. Although he never won a major pool tournament as "Fats", he was at one time perhaps the most publicly recognized pool player in the United States—not only as a player, but also as an entertainer. Wanderone was inducted in 1984 into the Billiard Congress of America Hall of Fame for his decades-long public promotion of pool. In 2026 Wanderone was awarded entertainer by Best in Billiards awards that celebrated America's 250 years.

Wanderone began playing at a young age in New York City. As a teenager, he became a traveling pool hustler. Later, in his thirties, he moved to Du Quoin, Illinois, where he met and married Evelyn, who became his first wife. She was a waitress at a steakhouse, The Perfection Club. They married two months after they met. During World War II, he hustled servicemen in Norfolk, Virginia. With the end of the war, Wanderone returned to Illinois and entered semi-retirement.

Wanderone, who was sometimes known by the nickname "New York Fats" in his role as a pool player, adopted the name "Minnesota Fats" from the character of that name in the 1961 film The Hustler, claiming that the character, played by Jackie Gleason, was based upon him.

He parlayed the association with the film into his own book deals and television appearances, including a series of matches with rival Willie Mosconi. Later in life, Wanderone divorced Evelyn and moved to Nashville, Tennessee, where he married his second wife, Theresa, with whom he remained until his death.

== Early life and career ==
Wanderone was born in New York City to Rudolf Walter Wanderon and his wife, Rose (née Rosa Burgin); both Swiss immigrants who married in New York. One of three siblings (he had two sisters), Rudolf Jr. was born in 1913, but sometimes hinted he was born earlier, even as early as 1900.

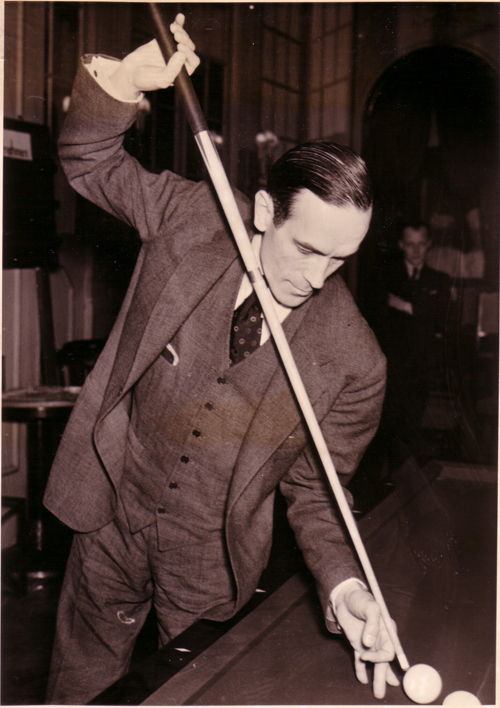
Wanderone's first billiards teacher, the German champion Erich Hagenlocher

Known as "Rudy" to friends and family, Wanderone started playing pool as a child while living in Washington Heights, Manhattan. In 1923, he traveled with his father to Europe, where he received training from German balkline billiards champion Erich Hagenlocher. His first prominent match was in 1926, when he competed against former nine-ball champion "Cowboy" Weston; Wanderone won, handily. Wanderone left school in the eighth grade and became a traveling pool hustler, spending much of the 1920s playing at a pool hall called Cranfield's in New York City, where he received his first nickname after beating another hustler known as "Smart Henry". The intensity of their competition led Wanderone's friend Titanic Thompson to dub Wanderone "Double-Smart". By the mid-1930s, during the Great Depression, Wanderone had become a manager of a pool hall, owned by a friend, in Anacostia, southeast Washington, D.C. He had acquired more notoriety and nicknames, including "Triple-Smart Fats", "New York Fats", "Broadway Fats", and "Chicago Fats", attracting action from other hustlers, including the then-unknown Luther "Wimpy" Lassiter.

In 1941, Wanderone and friend Jimmy Castras arrived in southern Illinois—a major hustling center on a fast track to televised tournament play—and settled in Du Quoin, Illinois, where he continued hustling. Eventually, he met Evelyn Inez Graff; they married two months to the day later, on May 7, 1941. Following their wedding, the Wanderones settled in Dowell, Illinois, where they lived a quiet life, residing at 611 South Street. In 1942, the couple moved to Norfolk, Virginia. Norfolk had become a key mustering point for American soldiers, as well as a shipbuilding center. The growing population led to an enormous interest in gambling; Wanderone, in partnership with fellow hustler Lassiter, quickly recognized the financial possibilities. Following World War II, however, the action soon "dried up", and the Wanderones returned to Little Egypt, Illinois. Throughout the 1950s, Wanderone was in semi-retirement, making only occasional hustling trips to New York City.

== "Minnesota Fats" ==
In 1961, the film version of Walter Tevis's 1959 novel The Hustler was released. The film tells the story of a pool shark named "Fast Eddie" Felson and his quest to beat the greatest pool player in America, "Minnesota Fats". World Champion Willie Mosconi served as a technical advisor and trick shot stunt man for the film. Wanderone almost immediately dropped his "New York Fats" nickname, adopted the name "Minnesota Fats", and began spreading the story that the character was based on him. Tevis denied this for the rest of his life. However, upon examining the novel's original manuscript, competitive pool player Derek Kirunchyk (an employee of Eastern Kentucky University, to which Tevis had donated it) discovered that Tevis had originally given the character the nickname "New York", then struck this through and replaced it with "Minnesota", lending credence to Fats' claim that he was the inspiration for the character; journalist and billiards historian R. A. Dyer subsequently examined the manuscript as well and discovered that Tevis had done this multiple times.

Promotional poster for The Player (1971) starring Wanderone as "Fats".

Wanderone's notoriety as "Minnesota Fats" led to a job as executive vice-president of billiard table manufacturer Rozel Industries, playing exhibition matches and giving demonstrations. Rozel, in 1965, published Fats' first book: Minnesota "Fats" Book of Billiards. On January 17, 1965, he appeared on the television game show What's My Line?, successfully stumping the panel.

In 1966, he wrote his autobiography, The Bank Shot, and Other Great Robberies, with Sports Illustrated journalist Tom Fox. His first television game show, Minnesota Fats Hustles the Pros, debuted in 1967, featuring "Fats" playing against other pro players.

In 1967 he completed and published an instructional paperback, Minnesota Fats on Pool, which was reprinted through 1976 in large-quantity editions, was then reissued as a hardcover in 1993, and remains to this day commonly available.

The next year, on January 24, 1968, Fats was a guest on The Joey Bishop Show. By 1970, Celebrity Billiards with Minnesota Fats, another short-lived television game show series, featured Fats playing against celebrity guests such as Sid Caesar.

In a feature film titled The Player (produced in December 1970, in Baton Rouge, Louisiana), Fats played himself as "Minnesota Fats" and was featured prominently on the promotional poster. The screenplay was written and directed by Thomas DeMartini, also starred pool pro Jack Colavita, and had a limited release in 1971 by International Cinema. That same year Fats was a guest on both The Tonight Show Starring Johnny Carson (September 21, 1971), on which he hustled Carson out of US$1, and the British David Frost Show (October 13, 1971). His fame as "Fats" had already made it difficult for Fats to hustle effectively, so he relied more and more on exhibition games for income.

By 1979, Fats was well known enough to play himself as a celebrity guest star on a season 2 episode of the popular television detective drama Vega$ titled "the Usurper". The episode featured "Fats" and pro Jimmy Mataya playing one another in a game of pool. In 1980, while visiting a one-mile stretch of St. Louis, Fats had to double his order of autographed pictures after he was stopped thirty-seven times. During this trip he was beaten by Michael Boulton 4 out of 10 times in games of pool.

== Rivalry with Willie Mosconi ==
Fats enjoyed promoting a feud with world champion Mosconi over how to present pool—either as a rough-and-tumble gambling game (Fats) or as a genteel pastime and art form (Mosconi). Mosconi's widow, Flora, said of the rivalry, "My husband hated Minnesota Fats because he felt that [Wanderone] was always hurting the image of the game instead of helping it." Fats would state smugly, "I may have 'given away' a few games to deserving competitors, but I have never lost a real money game since I was old enough to spell 'Weeli Mesconi'." The two competed on Valentine's Day (February 14), 1978 in a televised match on ABC's Wide World of Sports. With almost 11 million viewers, the game was the second-highest-rated episode of the show for that year, behind only the Muhammad Ali vs. Leon Spinks rematch. The game was held at New York's Waldorf Astoria Hotel and was announced by Howard Cosell. Although Fats lost the game, he won the audience with his banter and with his joking manner. Mosconi, on the other hand, was reportedly perceived as cold.

"Fats" lost a number of rematches to Mosconi in the following years. However, in the nationally broadcast Resorts International Shoot-Out of October 1984—Fats' last notable television appearance—he finally turned the tables on his rival. The event began with a trick shot competition among four players—Fats, Mosconi, Steve Mizerak, and Allen Hopkins.

Next, Hopkins and Fats played against Mosconi and Mizerak in doubles seven-ball, then nine-ball. Fats and Mosconi ultimately played a one-on-one game of seven-ball; Fats won the match. During the exhibition, a very quiet and genteel Mosconi blocked Fats' rough-and-tumble banter by wearing ear plugs; yet that failed to stop Fats from putting on a show for his fans. In an interview, Fats was asked about his strategy to defeat Mosconi and replied that he had thought to himself, "I'll make [the 7 ball] on the break and end it... then I'll help carry Willie out on a stretcher."

== Later life ==
The Billiard Congress of America in 1984 inducted Fats into its Hall of Fame for "Meritorious Service" in recognition of his contributions to helping popularize the game of pool. In 1984, Fats abandoned his wife, Evelyn; they divorced a year later.

Fats moved into the Hermitage Hotel in downtown Nashville, Tennessee, in 1985, remaining there for several years. In 1992, while undergoing surgery for a knee injury, he survived a massive heart attack. In 1993, he met and married his second wife, Teresa Talley Bell. He lived in Bell's Nashville house until his death on January 15, 1996, four days shy of his 83rd birthday, although some sources, including The New York Times, erroneously gave the date of his death as January 18.

Fats had no known children. Singer Etta James said she believed that he was her biological father, having reportedly been told that by her mother as well as by others who knew her mother and whom James described as "people who were there and should know". However, there is no published evidence of such a relationship. James and Fats are only known to have met once, in 1987.

In her autobiography, Rage to Survive, James recounted their meeting, writing that Fats neither confirmed nor denied his paternity. According to James, he told her that he did not recall the details of his life at the time of her conception well enough to know whether he could have been the father.

The epitaph on his tombstone reads: "Beat every living creature on Earth. 'St. Peter, rack 'em up. — Fats'".

== Personal character ==
Fats was known for ostentation, self-aggrandizement, tall tales, fast talk, and entertaining banter. He was even publicly recognized by famed boaster Muhammad Ali as better at boasting. His critical biographer, R.A. Dyer, documents that Fats completely fabricated a "here-by-fate" tale about a car wreck which brought the player to Little Egypt; it was a tale that Fats encouraged to be spread and further embellished in his autobiography to lend an air of the mystical to his public persona. He made false claims about beating Willie Mosconi so frequently that Mosconi filed a slander lawsuit, to little avail.

According to Dyer, Fats was notorious for nonstop chatter on subjects about which he knew little, or stories about himself. At the beginning of his first television match against Mosconi, Fats claimed: "I've never lost [a game] for money in my life; beat everyone that ever lived." Yet, as Dyer concedes, "Pool hustlers are, by nature, liars. And by this measure, Minnesota Fats was just a very, very good pool hustler."

Fats was a lover of animals and was reported to have had dozens of cats and dogs simultaneously, and to have devoted a lot of time to finding homes for strays. "I'm crazy about every living creature", he wrote in The Bank Shot. "It doesn't matter what it happens to be. I even love insects; in fact, I wouldn't swat a fly or a mosquito for a whole barrel of gold."

Remembered well for his turns of phrase and his puns, Fats once wrote, "If you happened to drive from Mobile to Dowell [Illinois] with a carload of pool hustlers, you would get bit so hard and so often that you would need a malaria vaccine and a new bankroll as well", a reference not only to the area's notorious mosquitos but also to the predatory nature of hustlers. Fats is remembered for saying on his way out a pool room door, "Boys, the only difference between me and everybody else is that everybody else drives around in a Volkswagen, and Minnesota Fats drives around in a Duesenberg." Fats would go virtually anywhere to help promote the game, and he was a crowd pleaser.

Fats owned various limousines throughout his career. He once toured the country in a colorful Lincoln limousine with his extended moniker painted along the side panels in translucent paint, changing colors as it moved with the reflections from the sun: "Minnesota Fats, King of Pool". His 1980 Cadillac Fleetwood limousine was later in the Nashville auto museum, until the facility closed.

Fats was notorious for his spontaneous wit. When he was named the "uncrowned king" of pool because he never got actively involved in tournament circles (owing to being too busy hustling), his reply: "You judge a king by the size of his wallet and his palace. You can leave the crown in the toilet."
