= Joe Balsis =

American pool player, born 1921

Personal information
- Nickname: "The Meatman"
- Born: 1921 Minersville, Pennsylvania, U.S
- Died: January 2, 1995 (aged 73–74)

Pool career
- Country: United States
- Turned pro: 1964

Tournament wins
- World Champion: Straight Pool (1965, 1965, 1966)

Joseph Balsis (1921 – January 2, 1995), nicknamed "the Meatman", was an American professional pool player, who was inducted into the Billiard Congress of America's Hall of Fame in 1982.

== Career ==
=== Early life ===
Joe grew up playing in the billiard room of his father, John, whose business was in the sale of meat. At an early, Balsis was deemed skilled enough by age 11 to play exhibition matches against professional players including Andrew Ponzi and Erwin Rudolph. When in his teens, he won four consecutive annual junior titles, then left the game and joined the Coast Guard as a boat machinist for several years during pool's temporary decline. In 1944, he took up competition again, winning the Armed Services Champion title.

=== Professional career ===
Balsis rejoined the game in 1964 Balsis, where he began to compete professionally. The following year, he won the World Straight Pool Championship twice and once in 1966. He won the Johnston City All-Around Championship, in 1966. Balsis would then win back-to-back titles at both the 1968 and 1969 Stardust Open All-Around Championship as well as the All Japan Championship in 1969. Between 1966 and 1975 Balsis reached the final of the BCA U.S. Open Straight Pool Championship on five occasions, where he would win twice (1968 & 1974).

== Titles ==
- 1965 BRPAA World Straight Pool Championship
- 1965 BRPAA World Straight Pool Championship
- 1965 National Billiards News Achievement Award
- 1966 Johnston City Straight Pool Championship
- 1966 Johnston City All-Around Championship
- 1966 BRPAA World Straight Pool Championship
- 1966 U.S. Invitation Pocket Billiard Championship
- 1967 Culver City Straight Pool Invitational
- 1967 Eastern States Straight Pool Championship
- 1968 Stardust Open Straight Pool Championship
- 1968 Stardust Open All-Around Championship
- 1968 U.S. Masters Straight Pool Championship
- 1968 U.S. Open Straight Pool Championship
- 1969 Stardust Open 9-Ball Championship
- 1969 Stardust Open All-Around Championship
- 1969 All Japan Championship 14.1
- 1969 All Japan Championship All-Around
- 1971 Stardust Open Straight Pool Championship
- 1974 U.S. Open Straight Pool Championship
- 1982 Billiard Congress of America Hall of Fame
