= U.S. Open Straight Pool Championship =

Pool tournament

The U.S. Open Straight Pool Championship was a pool tournament held in the United States, and one of the few featuring the discipline of straight pool. After being dormant for sixteen years, the event was resurrected in 2016, but has only been held sporadically since.

== Winners ==
Year	Winner
1966	(United States) Irving Crane
1967	(United States) Jimmy Caras
1968	(United States) Joe Balsis
1969	(United States) Luther Lassiter
1970	(United States) Steve Mizerak
1971	(United States) Steve Mizerak
1972	(United States) Steve Mizerak
1973	(United States) Steve Mizerak
1974	(United States) Joe Balsis
1975	(United States) Dallas West
1976	(United States) Tom Jennings
1977	(United States) Tom Jennings
1983	(United States) Dallas West
1989	(Germany) Oliver Ortmann
1992	(United States) Mike Sigel
1993	(Germany) Oliver Ortmann
2000	(Germany) Ralf Souquet
2016	(Philippines) Dennis Orcollo
2017	(Philippines) Lee Vann Corteza
2019	(United States) Shane Van Boening
