= Erwin Rudolph =

American pool player (1893–1957)

Personal information
- Born: 30 December 1893 Cleveland, Ohio, U.S.
- Died: 19 May 1957 (aged 63)

Pool career
- Country: United States

Tournament wins
- World Champion: Straight Pool (1927, 1927, 1930, 1933, 1941)

Erwin Rudolph (December 30, 1893 – May 19, 1957) was an American pocket billiards player from Cleveland, Ohio and a five-time world champion. One of his great feats was running 125 points in 32 minutes (now eclipsed).

== Biography ==
Rudolph was born on December 30, 1893, in Cleveland, Ohio. He gained national recognition in 1926 when he won the world pocket billiard title, besting Ralph Greenleaf, who held it for six years. Rudolph won the championship again in 1933, a third time in that same year and for the fourth and final time in 1941. His best run in straight pool was 277. He then went to work for the Brunswick-Balke-Collender Company. Rudolph died on May 19, 1957, in Sayre, Pennsylvania.

== Legacy ==
Rudolph was inducted to the Billiard Congress of America Hall of Fame in 1987.
