= Jimmy Caras =

American pool player

Personal information
- Born: 17 December 1908 Scranton, Pennsylvania, US
- Died: 3 December 2002 (aged 93)

Pool career
- Country: United States

Tournament wins
- World Champion: Straight Pool (1935, 1936, 1938, 1938, 1949)

James Caras (17 December 1908 – 3 December 2002) was an American professional pool player, most well known for winning five World Straight Pool Championship titles between 1935 and 1949.

After a 12-year hiatus, Caras would return to cue sports, and win the BCA U.S. Open Straight Pool Championship in 1967 at the age of 58. Caras would be inducted into the Billiard Congress of America Hall of Fame in 1977.

Caras is also known for inventing trick shots, as well as producing books, such as Pocket billiard fundamentals and trick shots made easy in 1969. and Trick and Fancy Shots in Pocket Billiards in 1966.

== Titles and other honors ==
- 1935 NBAA World Straight Pool Championship
- 1936 NBAA World Straight Pool Championship
- 1938 NBAA World Straight Pool Championship
- 1938 NBAA World Straight Pool Championship
- 1949 BCA World Straight Pool Championship
- 1967 BCA U.S. Open Straight Pool Championship
- 1967 Billiard Congress of America Hall of Fame
- 1967 National Billiards News Achievement Award
- 1976 Delaware Sports Hall of Fame induction
- 1979 Pennsylvania Sports Hall of Fame induction
