= Ralph Greenleaf =

American pool player (1899–1950)

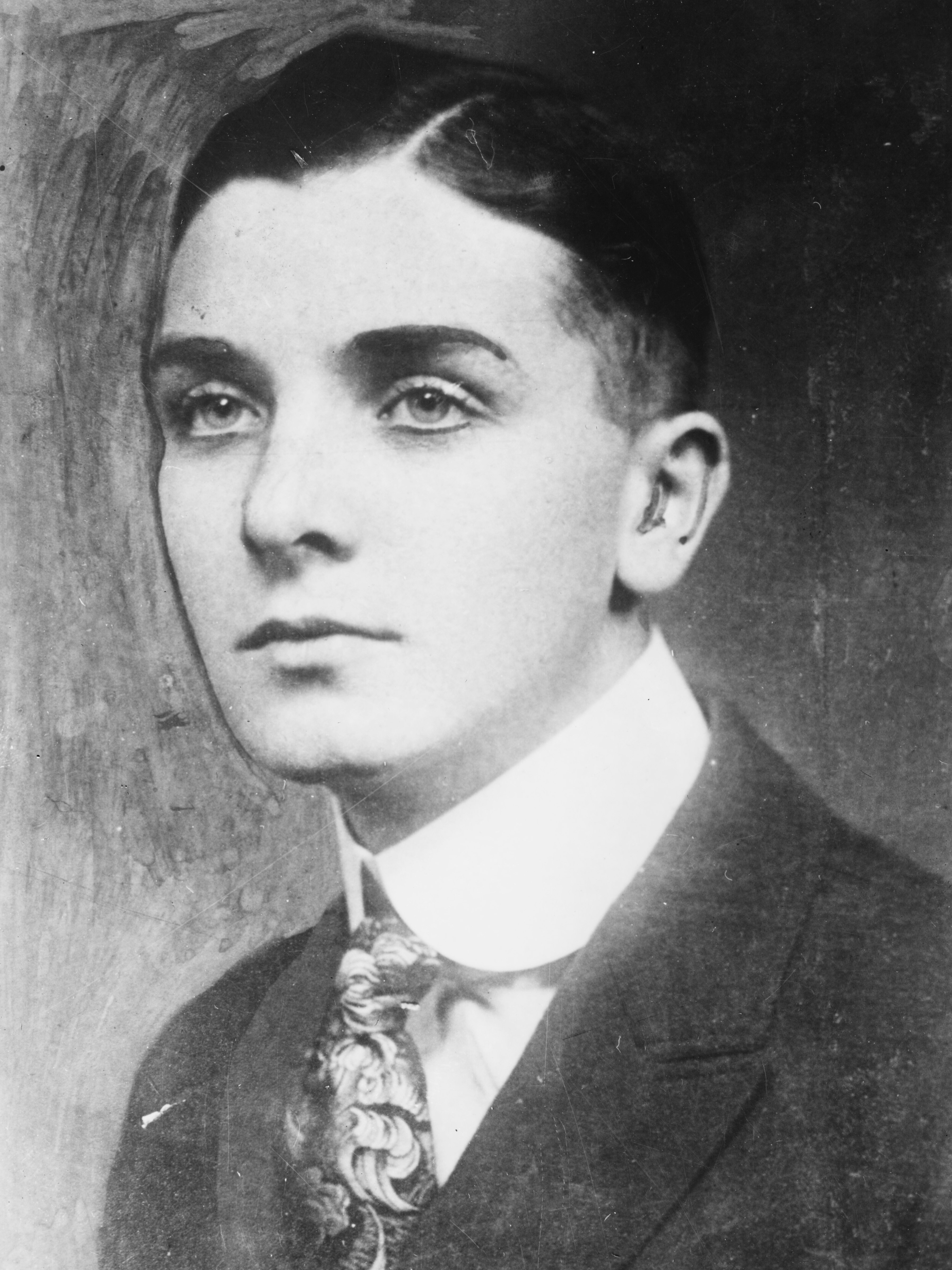
- Greenleaf c. 1920

Personal information
- Born: 3 November 1899 Monmouth, Illinois, U.S.
- Died: 15 March 1950 (aged 50) Philadelphia, Pennsylvania, U.S.

Pool career
- Country: United States
- Turned pro: 1916

Tournament wins
- World Champion: Straight Pool 19x

Ralph Greenleaf (November 3, 1899 – March 15, 1950) was an American professional pool and carom billiards player. Greenleaf is widely considered one of the greatest pool players of all time. Between the years 1919 and 1938, he won the World Straight Pool Championship nineteen times.

His obituary in The New York Times said of Greenleaf, in March 1950: "What Babe Ruth did for baseball, Dempsey did for fighting, Tilden did for tennis...Greenleaf did for pocket billiards."

The championships of his era were contested in the game of 14.1 continuous ("straight pool"), but varied in format from contest to contest and were not annual events. Championships were challenge matches between two players often played over several days to relatively high numbers (1,500 points for example).

He was one of the first three members inducted into the Billiard Congress of America's Hall of Fame, in 1966. He was ranked number 3 on the Billiards Digest 50 Greatest Players of the Century.

== Biography ==
Greenleaf married vaudeville actress Amelia Ruth Parker, a Eurasian known by the stage names "Princess Nai Tai Tai" and "The Oriental Nightingale", with whom he toured, performing trick shot demonstrations when not competing.

In a pool championship match, Greenleaf was a fierce competitor, winning his first world title in 1919, as well as others, off and on, through 1937. His only unbeatable enemy was considered the bottle, though even his worst bouts rarely seemed to interfere with his performance. In 1942, he came in third place, behind Willie Hoppe and Welker Cochran in the World Three-Cushion Championship.

During this era, the press used euphemisms like "playboy" for sports idols and other public figures who, like Greenleaf, suffered from severe alcoholism. In 1935, the media reported that Greenleaf "fell off the wagon" when he vanished just before a crucial tournament in New York and woke up in Oklahoma under arrest as a vagrant. In order for him to be released, he had to prove to the constable his identity by walking across the street to a pool hall located in front of the jailhouse in Okmulgee by running 87 balls consecutively. Another distinction of this era in the 1930s is that pool games were traditionally played on billiards tables that were 5 feet by 10 feet, as opposed to today's professional standards which have tables that are 4.5 ft × 9 ft, and the (often clay or ivory) balls were bigger than today's synthetic plastic and resin pool balls.

Greenleaf had a hobby that he took seriously which was raising turkeys and chickens at his farm on the Chesapeake Bay in Maryland, in which he made a profit. His last championship title was in 1937 when he defeated Irving Crane by a score of 125 to minus one.

He died suddenly at the age of 50 from acute internal hemorrhage in the waiting room of a hospital in Philadelphia. He had been ill for several days, but had refused to seek medical treatment by going to a hospital because of an upcoming match he was to have played in New York, scheduled several days after he passed.

== Titles & achievements ==
- 1919 14.1 Record High Run. 155 Consecutive Balls
- 1919 World Straight Pool Championship
- 1920 World Straight Pool Championship
- 1921 NBAA World Straight Pool Championship
- 1921 NBAA World Straight Pool Championship
- 1922 NBAA World Straight Pool Championship
- 1922 NBAA World Straight Pool Championship
- 1922 NBAA World Straight Pool Championship
- 1922 NBAA World Straight Pool Championship
- 1922 14.1 Record High Run. 206 Consecutive Balls
- 1923 NBAA World Straight Pool Championship
- 1924 National Straight Pool Championship
- 1924 NBAA World Straight Pool Championship
- 1926 NBAA World Straight Pool Championship
- 1928 National Straight Pool Championship
- 1928 NBAA World Straight Pool Championship
- 1929 NBAA World Straight Pool Championship
- 1931 NBAA World Straight Pool Championship
- 1932 NBAA World Straight Pool Championship
- 1933 NBAA World Straight Pool Championship
- 1937 NBAA World Straight Pool Championship
- 1937 NBAA World Straight Pool Championship
- 1937 NBAA World Straight Pool Championship
- 1966 Billiard Congress of America Hall of Fame
