= Johnston City, Illinois =

Johnston City
- City
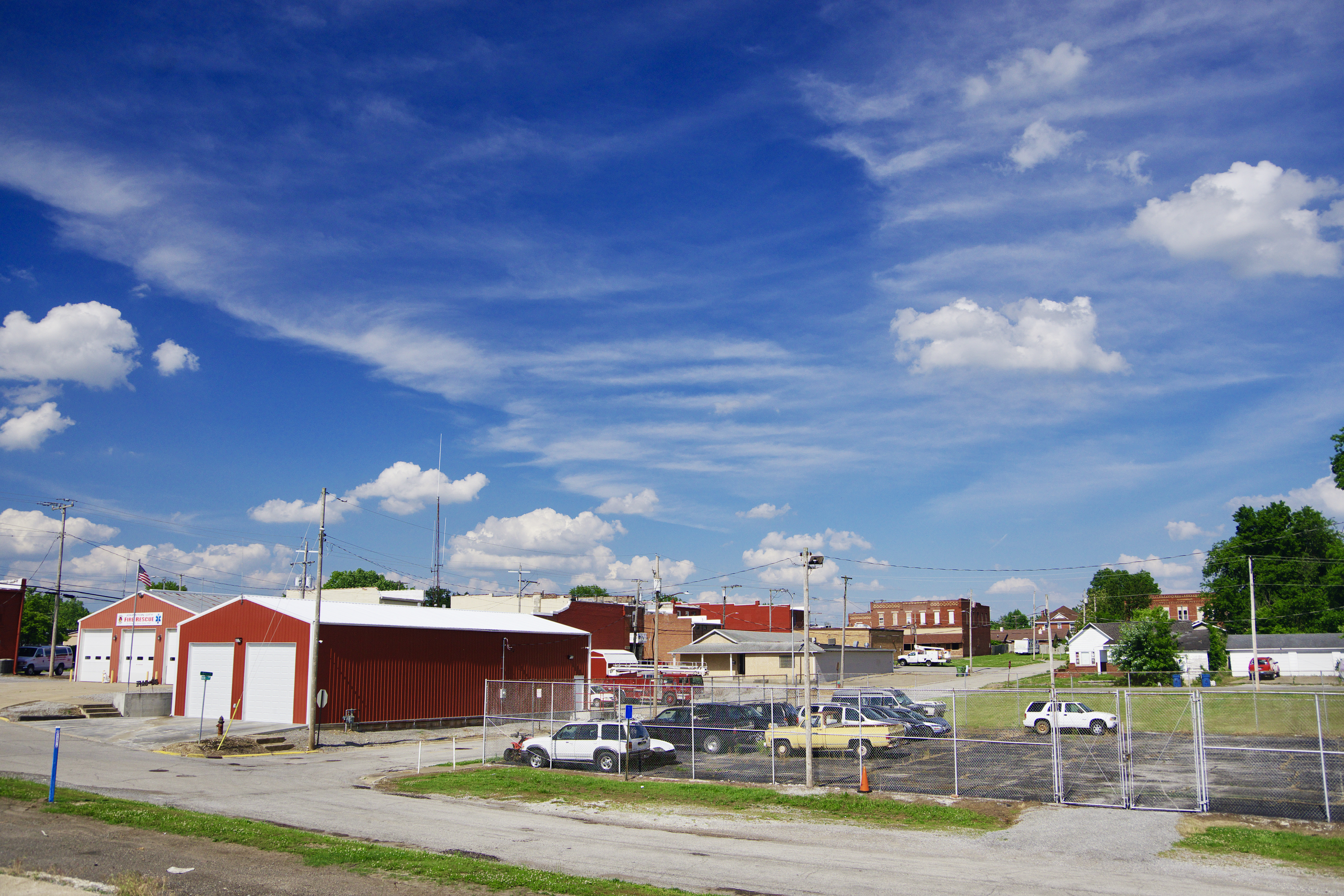
- Johnston City

- Location of Johnston City in Williamson County, Illinois.
- Coordinates: 37°49′17″N 88°55′44″W
- Country: United States
- State: Illinois
- County: Williamson

Area
  - Total: 2.17 sq mi (5.63 km^{2})
  - Land: 2.12 sq mi (5.48 km^{2})
  - Water: 0.058 sq mi (0.15 km^{2})
- Elevation: 440 ft (130 m)

Population (2020)
  - Total: 3,384
  - Density: 1,599.2/sq mi (617.47/km^{2})
- Time zone: UTC-6 (CST)
  - Summer (DST): UTC-5 (CDT)
- ZIP Code: 62951
- Area code: 618
- FIPS code: 17-38544
- GNIS feature ID: 2395475

Johnston City is a city in Williamson County, Illinois, United States. The population was 3,348 at the 2020 census. This was a center of coal mining in the early 20th century, having a peak of population in the 1920s. The mining jobs attracted many immigrants from Europe.

== History ==
Johnston City was founded in 1894 as a stop along the Chicago, Paducah and Memphis Railroad (later part of the Chicago and Eastern Illinois), and named for the contracting firm that constructed the railroad.

The eastern part of the city was originally known as Jeffersonville. It was surveyed in 1853. During the American Civil War it was a prosperous village. The post office was established in 1852 under the name Lake Creek. It was moved to Johnston City in 1903 but it was not until several years after that that Jeffersonville was fully amalgamated into Johnston City.

In the late 19th and early 20th centuries, a number of immigrant miners from Italy, Wales and other areas arrived to work in the coal mines. There were tensions among the different ethnic groups, especially when miners went out on strike for better wages and conditions.

On June 10, 1915, the city was the site of the lynching of Joe Strando, an Italian immigrant miner from Sicily, by a mob of 300 American men. He was taken from the jail where he was held as a suspect in the murder of Edward Chapman, a wealthy local citizen, and wounding of his daughter. Sicilians were outraged and gathered reinforcements; Americans were arrayed against them. The governor sent in three companies of militia to suppress violence. Six years later, immigrant Settino de Santis confessed to the murder of Chapman, saying that the man was accidentally shot while visiting at the home of mine foreman Ben Schull. De Santis and two other men shot at Schull in retaliation for having been fired. De Santis confessed before he was executed in another capital case.

With the decline of mining, the number of jobs fell. By 1940 the city's population was just under 4,000. For 2015 the US Census estimated the population at 3500.

In the 1960s a decline in coal miners occurred due to safety standards in the coal mines.

== Geography ==
According to the 2010 census, Johnston City has a total area of 2.12 square miles (5.49 km^{2}), of which 2.06 square miles (5.34 km^{2}) (or 97.17%) is land and 0.06 square miles (0.16 km^{2}) (or 2.83%) is water.

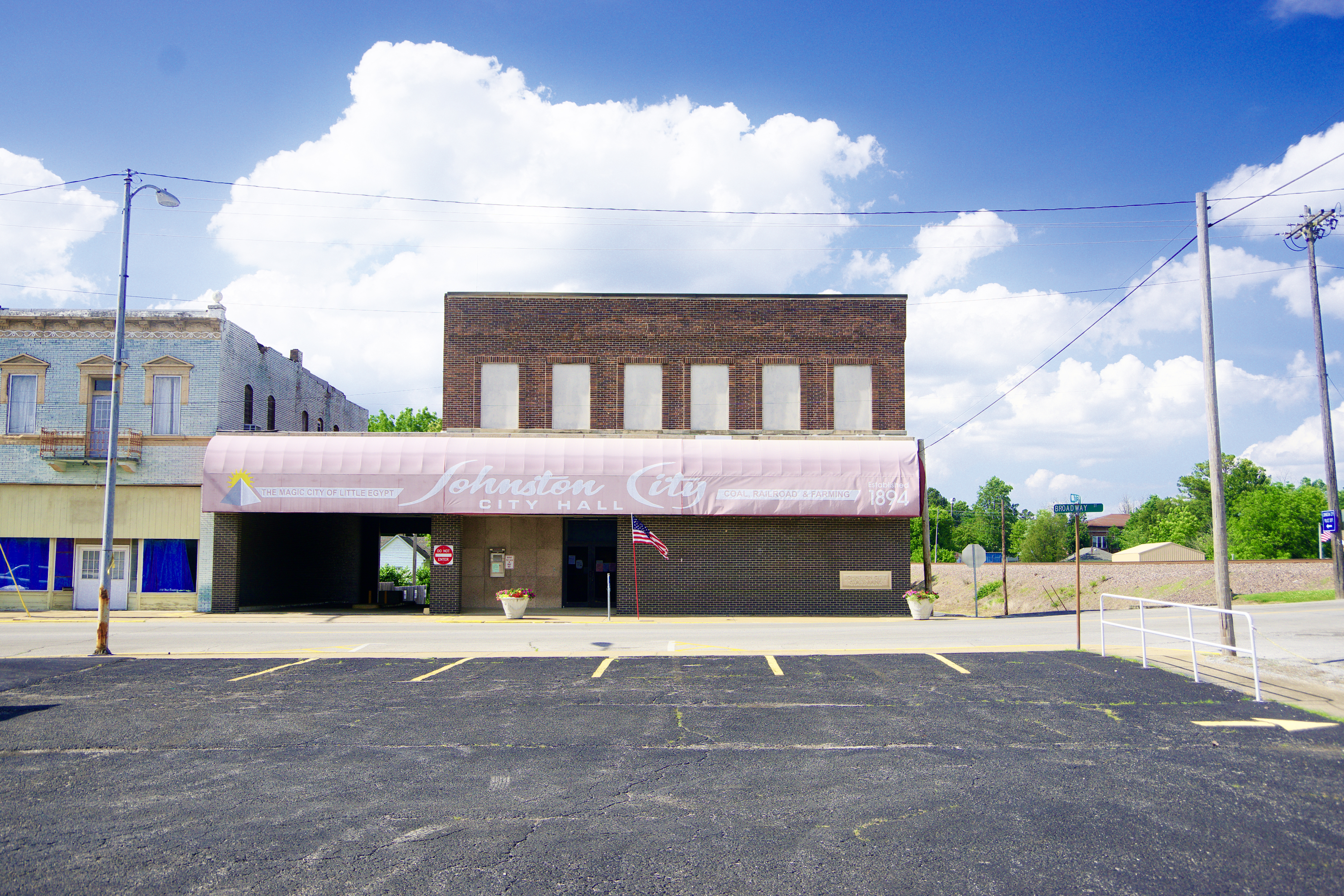
Johnston City Hall

== Demographics ==
Historical population
| Census | Pop. | Note | %± |
|---|---|---|---|
| 1900 | 787 | | — |
| 1910 | 3,248 | | 312.7% |
| 1920 | 7,137 | | 119.7% |
| 1930 | 5,945 | | −16.7% |
| 1940 | 5,418 | | −8.9% |
| 1950 | 4,479 | | −17.3% |
| 1960 | 3,891 | | −13.1% |
| 1970 | 3,982 | | 2.3% |
| 1980 | 3,873 | | −2.7% |
| 1990 | 3,706 | | −4.3% |
| 2000 | 3,557 | | −4.0% |
| 2010 | 3,565 | | 0.2% |
| 2020 | 3,384 | | −5.1% |
U.S. Census

=== 2020 census ===
As of the 2020 census, Johnston City had a population of 3,384. The median age was 40.9 years. 23.3% of residents were under the age of 18 and 18.9% of residents were 65 years of age or older. For every 100 females there were 93.4 males, and for every 100 females age 18 and over there were 88.7 males age 18 and over.

0.0% of residents lived in urban areas, while 100.0% lived in rural areas.

There were 1,475 households in Johnston City, of which 29.0% had children under the age of 18 living in them. Of all households, 38.8% were married-couple households, 19.3% were households with a male householder and no spouse or partner present, and 33.7% were households with a female householder and no spouse or partner present. About 33.8% of all households were made up of individuals and 16.8% had someone living alone who was 65 years of age or older.

There were 1,678 housing units, of which 12.1% were vacant. The homeowner vacancy rate was 4.4% and the rental vacancy rate was 13.9%.

Racial composition as of the 2020 census
| Race | Number | Percent |
|---|---|---|
| White | 3,068 | 90.7% |
| Black or African American | 35 | 1.0% |
| American Indian and Alaska Native | 11 | 0.3% |
| Asian | 2 | 0.1% |
| Native Hawaiian and Other Pacific Islander | 0 | 0.0% |
| Some other race | 24 | 0.7% |
| Two or more races | 244 | 7.2% |
| Hispanic or Latino (of any race) | 93 | 2.7% |

=== 2000 census ===
As of the census of 2000, there were 3,557 people, 1,560 households, and 1,010 families residing in the city. The population density was 1,820.9 inhabitants per square mile (703.1/km^{2}). There were 1,745 housing units at an average density of 893.3 per square mile (344.9/km^{2}). The racial makeup of the city was 99.07% White, 0.11% African American, 0.14% Native American, 0.06% Asian, 0.08% from other races, and 0.53% from two or more races. Hispanic or Latino of any race were 1.07% of the population.

There were 1,560 households, out of which 27.9% had children under the age of 18 living with them, 47.8% were married couples living together, 13.5% had a female householder with no husband present, and 35.2% were non-families. 31.8% of all households were made up of individuals, and 17.4% had someone living alone who was 65 years of age or older. The average household size was 2.28 and the average family size was 2.86.

In the city, the population was spread out, with 22.8% under the age of 18, 7.9% from 18 to 24, 27.1% from 25 to 44, 23.5% from 45 to 64, and 18.7% who were 65 years of age or older. The median age was 39 years. For every 100 females, there were 85.5 males. For every 100 females age 18 and over, there were 81.1 males.

The median income for a household in the city was $25,143, and the median income for a family was $32,363. Males had a median income of $30,038 versus $16,853 for females. The per capita income for the city was $12,764. About 19.6% of families and 22.5% of the population were below the poverty line, including 26.9% of those under age 18 and 17.1% of those age 65 or over.
