= Irving Crane =

American pool player (1913–2002)

Personal information
- Nickname: "The Deacon"
- Born: 13 November 1913 Livonia, New York, U.S.
- Died: 17 November 2001 (aged 88)

Pool career
- Country: United States
- Turned pro: 1937

Tournament wins
- World Champion: Straight Pool (1942, 1946, 1955, 1968, 1970, 1972)

Irving Crane (November 13, 1913 – November 17, 2001), nicknamed "the Deacon", was an American pool player from Livonia, New York, and ranks among the stellar players in the history of the sport. Widely considered one of the greatest pool players of all time, and a member of the Billiard Congress of America Hall of Fame, he is best known for his mastery in the game of straight pool (14.1 continuous) at which he won numerous championships, including six World Straight Pool Championship titles.

== Early life ==
Crane's fascination with billiards started at age 11, sparked by play on a toy pool table his brother received as a Christmas gift. When he showed interest and ability, his father Scott Crane, a trial lawyer and sportsman, and his mother, a high school teacher, soon replaced their dining room table with a 4' by 8' pool table. He soon ventured out of the home to practice a couple days each week at Olympic Billiards, a room that was part of a bowling alley in Scottsville, a suburb of Rochester, New York. Crane stated in 1998: "Other kids, you know they'd play for twenty minutes or half an hour and they'd say, 'let's do something else.' I could play all day and never get enough. I couldn't wait to get home from school to play."

Crane's status as a wunderkind was quickly evident; although he was entirely self-taught, at 14 he ran 89 balls in straight pool at a local pool room, calling each shot in advance, as is mandatory in straight pool. Following this feat, his parents replaced the smaller table with a full size tournament table. Over the next ten years some of the best players of the era, including Willie Hoppe and Andrew Ponzi, came to practice with the promising champion. Despite consistent play throughout his teenage years, Crane did not enter any tournaments until he was 23 years old.

In February 1939, at age 26, Crane ran 150 balls and out against his opponent in an exhibition straight pool match on a difficult 5' by 10' table in Layton, Utah. While this was impressive in and of itself, at the crowd's urging, he continued his run, ultimately pocketing 309 consecutive setting an official record at the time.

== World titles ==
This coup was soon followed by his first world title in 1942. Over the following three decades, Crane won almost two dozen major championships, including the World Straight Pool Championship in 1942, 1946, 1955, 1968, 1970 and 1972, the Ballantine International Championship in 1965, the International Roundrobin championship in 1968, and the World Series of Pool in 1978. Of these triumphs, his win at the 1966 BCA U.S. Open Straight Pool Championship is one of the most celebrated, him running 150 and out in the finals, never letting his opponent back to the table after an early safety battle; an accomplishment that has never been equalled in the tournament. Crane also holds the record for the most runner-up finishes at the World Straight Pool Championship on 13 occasions.

Despite his mastery and world renown, Crane found it hard to make a living solely playing pool, and in 1957 began working as a Cadillac salesman at Valley Cadillac Inc. 333 East Avenue in Rochester, New York. He continued there for 17 years. According to Crane's daughter, at Rochester's annual auto show his dealership's exhibit featured a pool table at which Crane would run balls while answering questions. "Working" for a living was purely a choice of survival. In an interview with Sports Illustrated in 1969, Crane said, "If I had to make a choice between selling cars and playing pool, I'd choose pool... The only time I've ever been really happy is when I was at a pool table."

Described as a "tall, lean man with the imperial bearing of the headmaster of Eton," Crane earned the appellation "the Deacon" because of his gentlemanly ways, his very cautious approach to the game and his impeccable dress, never approaching a pool table except in a conservative suit. Los Angeles Times sports columnist Jim Murray once said Crane "would make Henry Fonda look furtive." Highlighting Crane's both cautious approach and mastery, Mike Sigel, one of pool's most illustrious players, reportedly asked Crane to play one day when Sigel was a young player. Crane assented and after Sigel broke, Crane ran 200 balls and then played a safety.

== Later life ==
In an interview with the Los Angeles Times, Crane's wife of 64 years, Althea, stated, "A lot of people, if it was a hot day and there was no air conditioning, they'd take off their coat to play. But not Irving Crane." Rudolph Wanderone, a.k.a. Minnesota Fats, once opined, "Irv Crane would have been the only guy to notice the horse under Lady Godiva," while professional rival Willie Mosconi who had criticized Crane for his cautious style, stated in his 1993 autobiography, Willie's Game, that "Crane wouldn't take a shot unless his grandmother could make it."

Crane was inducted into the Billiard Congress of America's hall of fame in 1978. In 1999, Crane was ranked as number eight on Billiard Digest's fifty greatest players of the century. In his entry there, he is lauded as having been, along with Mosconi, the "best in the world, flat out" between 1941 and 1956.

In 1980, Crane retired from professional play. He stopped playing entirely in about 1996. On November 17, 2001, at age 88, four days after entering a nursing home, Crane died of natural causes. He was survived by his wife Althea, son Irving, daughter Sandra, three grandchildren, and eight great-grandchildren.

== Career titles ==
- 1939 14.1 Record High Run. 309 Consecutive Balls
- 1942 BAA World Straight Pool Championship
- 1946 BAA World Straight Pool Championship
- 1950 U.S. National Straight Pool Championship
- 1952 Eastern States 3-Cushion Championship
- 1955 BCA World Straight Pool Championship
- 1963 Tournament of Champions
- 1963 U.S. Masters Straight Pool Championship
- 1965 Stardust Open Straight Pool Championship
- 1965 Schaeffer Straight Pool Classic
- 1965 Ballatine Invitational Championship
- 1966 BCA U.S. Open Straight Pool Championship
- 1967 Johnston City Straight Pool Championship
- 1968 BRPAA World Straight Pool Championship
- 1968 Stardust Open Nine-Ball Championship
- 1968 International Pocket Billiard Championship
- 1968 National Billiards News Achievement Award
- 1970 BCA World Straight Pool Championship
- 1970 Salt City Championship
- 1970 National Billiards News Achievement Award
- 1972 BCA World Straight Pool Championship
- 1975 Masters Classic 14.1 Championship
- 1978 World Series of Pool
- 1978 Billiard Congress of America Hall of Fame
- 1999 Billiards Digest 4th Greatest Living Player of the Century
