= Masako Katsura =

Japanese billiards player (1913–1995)

- Katsura lining up a shot at the 1954 World Three-Cushion Billiards tournament in Buenos Aires

Personal information
- Native name: 桂 マサ子
- Nickname: Katsy
- Nationality: Japanese
- Citizenship: American
- Born: 7 March 1913 Tokyo City, Empire of Japan
- Died: 20 December 1995 (aged 82) Japan
- Occupation: Professional carom billiards player
- Spouse: Vernon Greenleaf (m. 1950; died 1967)

Sport
- Country: Japan
- Sport: carom billiards
- Turned pro: 1947
- Coached by: Tomio Kobashi; Kinrey Matsuyama
- Retired: 1961

Masako Katsura (桂 マサ子, Katsura Masako;; 7 March 1913 – 20 December 1995), nicknamed "Katsy" and sometimes called the "First Lady of Billiards", was a Japanese carom billiards player who was most active in the 1950s. She was the first woman to compete and place among the best in the male-dominated world of professional billiards. First learning the game from her brother-in-law and then under the tutelage of Japanese champion Kinrey Matsuyama, Katsura became Japan's only female professional player. In competition in Japan, she took second place in the country's national three-cushion billiards championship three times. In exhibition she was noted for running 10,000 points at the game of straight rail.

After marrying a U.S. Army non-commissioned officer in 1950, Katsura emigrated to the United States in 1951. There she was invited to play in the 1952 U.S.-sponsored World Three-Cushion Championship, ultimately taking seventh place at that competition. Katsura was the first woman ever to be included in any world billiards tournament. Her fame cemented, Katsura went on an exhibition tour of the United States with eight-time world champion Welker Cochran, and later with 51-time world champion Willie Hoppe. In 1953 and 1954, she again competed for the world three-cushion crown, taking fifth and fourth places respectively.

Little was seen of Katsura for the next few years. She made 30 exhibition appearances in 1958, and went on a one-week exhibition engagement the following year with Harold Worst, but did not compete in any professional tournaments. In 1959, she made two television appearances on ABC's You Asked for It, and one on the CBS primetime television hit What's My Line? Katsura returned to competition in 1961, playing a challenge match for the World Three-Cushion title against Worst, then reigning world champion, and was defeated by him. Katsura disappeared from the sport thereafter, only making a brief impromptu appearance in 1976. She moved back to Japan around 1990 and died in 1995.

== Life and career ==
=== Early years ===
I practice before parlor open every day for two hours. Every day I practice, Soon I play with many men. Men want to beat me. I play men, six, seven hours a day. Men no like, they do not beat me. If I hit no good, my brother-in-law, after billiard parlor closed, say this shot no good. This shot bad, I make good. He tells me. Not so many good woman players in Japan. I have sister. Very good. Same stroke.

— Masako Katsura, from an interview by Jimmy Cannon, excerpted in Byrne's Advanced Technique in Pool and Billiards (1990)

Masako Katsura was born on 7 March 1913 in Tokyo. Little is known about Katsura's childhood in Japan. Katsura had three sisters and a brother. Their father died when Katsura was 12 years old and she went to live with her elder sister and her sister's husband, Tomio Kobashi, who owned a billiard parlor. By 13 she was spending time in her brother-in-law's billiard room, and by 14 she was working as a billiard attendant there. Kobashi was a fine player and taught Katsura the fundamentals of various carom billiards games. Katsura also had a billiard table at home, bought by her family after she showed intense interest in the sport. Katsura practiced diligently, and began competing against Japanese men and beating them. At just 15, Katsura won the women's championship straight rail tournament of Japan. "Then I turned professional and began touring with a sister all over Japan, China and Formosa", said Katsura in a 1959 interview. Katsura's two younger sisters, Noriko and Tadako, also won the women's straight rail championship in other years.

In 1937, Katsura met Kinrey Matsuyama, who had won Japan's national three-cushion championship multiple times. Matsuyama was also U.S. national champion in 1934, was the runner-up three other times and had four second-place finishes in world competition at 18.2 balkline prior to World War II. Matsuyama was impressed with Katsura and began teaching her top level play. By 1947, Katsura was a long-established billiard star in Japan—the country's only female professional player.

=== Marriage and titles in Japan ===
During 1947 Katsura caught the eye of American serviceman Vernon Greenleaf (no relation to the pool and carom billiards champion Ralph Greenleaf), a master sergeant in the U.S. Army's Quartermaster Corps who had been in the armed services for 22 years. Katsura and Greenleaf first met in a Tokyo service club where she was giving billiard exhibitions. Greenleaf began taking lessons from Katsura and was quickly smitten with her. They were married on 30 November 1950, but never had any children.

At the time of their marriage Katsura already boasted two second-place finishes at Japan's national three-cushion championship; one from the year prior to their wedding. She claimed the runner-up spot for a third time the year of her marriage. About that time she accomplished the lofty feat of scoring 10,000 contiguous points at straight rail in an exhibition by nursing the balls around the table 27 times over about 4 1/2 hours. She stopped at 10,000 points only because it was a benchmark round number. In later years she said that her high run in three-cushion billiards (number of points scored consecutively in a single inning) was 19.

=== Immigration to the U.S. ===
In 1951 Greenleaf was transferred to a U.S. post from Haneda Air Base in Tokyo. He and Katsura, who spoke little English, set sail for the United States on the USS Breckinridge, debarking in San Francisco at the end of December 1951, just a few months before the 1952 World Three-Cushion Billiards tournament was scheduled to begin in that city on 6 March. Katsura had been conditionally invited to play at the world championship after Cochran, whose billiard parlor was hosting the tournament, had heard of her brilliance from Matsuyama. Cochran was an 8-time world champion having won the world crown at three-cushion billiards in 1933, 1935, 1937, 1938, 1944 and 1945, and at 18.2 balkline, in 1927 and 1934. Cochran sent his son, W. R. (Dick) Cochran, a naval officer stationed in Japan, to investigate and received back a glowing report that said (possibly to Cochran's annoyance), "this girl is better than you are!" Though the decision was ultimately in the hands of the Billiard Congress of America as tournament sponsor, they gave Cochran the option to invite her.

After Katsura arrived in the U.S., she gave a private exhibition for Cochran, who wanted to make sure she was as good as reported before finalizing the invitation. At that meeting she clicked off runs of 300 and 400 at straight rail, made in the words of Cochran "almost unbelievable shots" after switching to balkline, and showed high competence at three-cushion, consistently scoring. Cochran made the invite "final" and stated: "She's the most marvelous thing I ever saw... She's liable to beat anybody, even Willie Hoppe... I could not see any weak spots... She's going to give lots of those players fits." As a warm-up for the competition Katsura gave a number of billiard exhibitions during February 1952.

== 1952 World Three-Cushion Billiards tournament ==
=== First woman to compete for a world title ===
If you eliminate three cushion, I don't think you could find five people in the world who could beat her. Her best games are straight rail and balkline, but she'll be the three cushion champion of the world in time. She has one of the best strokes I've ever seen, and she shoots as well left-handed as right-handed.

— Welker Cochran, quoted in Byrne's Advanced Technique in Pool and Billiards (1990)

Katsura's participation in the 1952 World Three-Cushion Billiards title marked the first time that a woman had competed for any world billiards title. This was only ten years after Ruth McGinnis became the first woman to have ever been invited to play in any men's professional billiard championship (the New York State Championship of 1942). The defending champion was the then 64-year-old internationally renowned Willie Hoppe, who would retire later that year with 51 world titles to his name between 1906 and 1952 in three forms of carom billiards, three-cushion, (four sub-disciplines of) balkline and cushion caroms. Before the tournament, speculation had it that when Hoppe met Katsura in the championship in the race to 50 points format, he would defeat her with Katsura still needing at least 40. After seeing her play, Hoppe said "she has a fine stroke and can make shots with either hand. I look forward to playing with her." The public was fascinated by the novelty of a woman player. Life magazine reported that "San Franciscans who did not know a cue from a cucumber crowded in to see her... Katy [sic]... stole the show."

=== Tournament roster ===
The 10 champions slated to play in the round robin format tournament were Katsura, her mentor, Matsuyama, favorite and defending champion Willie Hoppe, Mexican champion Joe Chamaco, Herb Hardt of Chicago, New York's Art Rubin, Los Angeles' Joe Procita, Ray Kilgore of San Francisco, Jay Bozeman of Vallejo and Binghamton's Irving Crane. The championship between the invitees was to take place at Cochran's 924 Club, with 45 total games to be played (each player to play every other once) over the 17-day tournament ending on 22 March 1952. The tournament was reported to have "The greatest billiard field since before World War II". First place earned a $2,000 purse (today $24,200), plus thousands in exhibition fees. Following behind to eight places were prizes of $1,000, $700, $500, $350, $300, $250 and $250 respectively.

=== Detail of play ===
On the second day of the competition, 7 March 1952, Katsura drew Irving Crane for her first match. They made quite a contrast as Crane was the tallest player at the tourney, while Katsura was described by reporter Curley Grieve of the San Francisco Examiner as "so small and doll-like she looks like a figurine in her flowing, gold-satin gown." Crane's main discipline was straight pool, at which he won numerous championships, including six world titles. The match was close, but Crane prevailed 50 to 42 in 57 innings. On 10 March, Katsura defeated Herb Hardt 50 to 42 in 58 innings. Katsura was significantly behind at one point but counted 15 points in five innings to take the lead. On 11 March, she lost to Chamaco, 50 to 35, but the following day Katsura upset Procita 50–43 in 63 innings, with runs of six, five and four. "Spectators exclaimed 'brilliant' and 'sensational' at some of her shots."

On 14 March, Katsura faced the undefeated Hoppe, losing 50 to 31 in 36 innings. Though Hoppe was a darling of the public, the crowd of more than 500 spectators was clearly rooting for Katsura throughout. The next day she faced her mentor, Matsuyama, considered the contender with the best shot at beating Hoppe. Matsuyama edged out his protégé with a close 50 to 48 finish in 51 innings. By the 21st inning Matsuyama held a 29–21 lead. Katsura battled back, the score 43–42 in her favor by inning 33, but Matsuyama ran three in the 46th inning, and Katsura could not close the gap. Mentor and protégé alike posted high runs of six in the match.

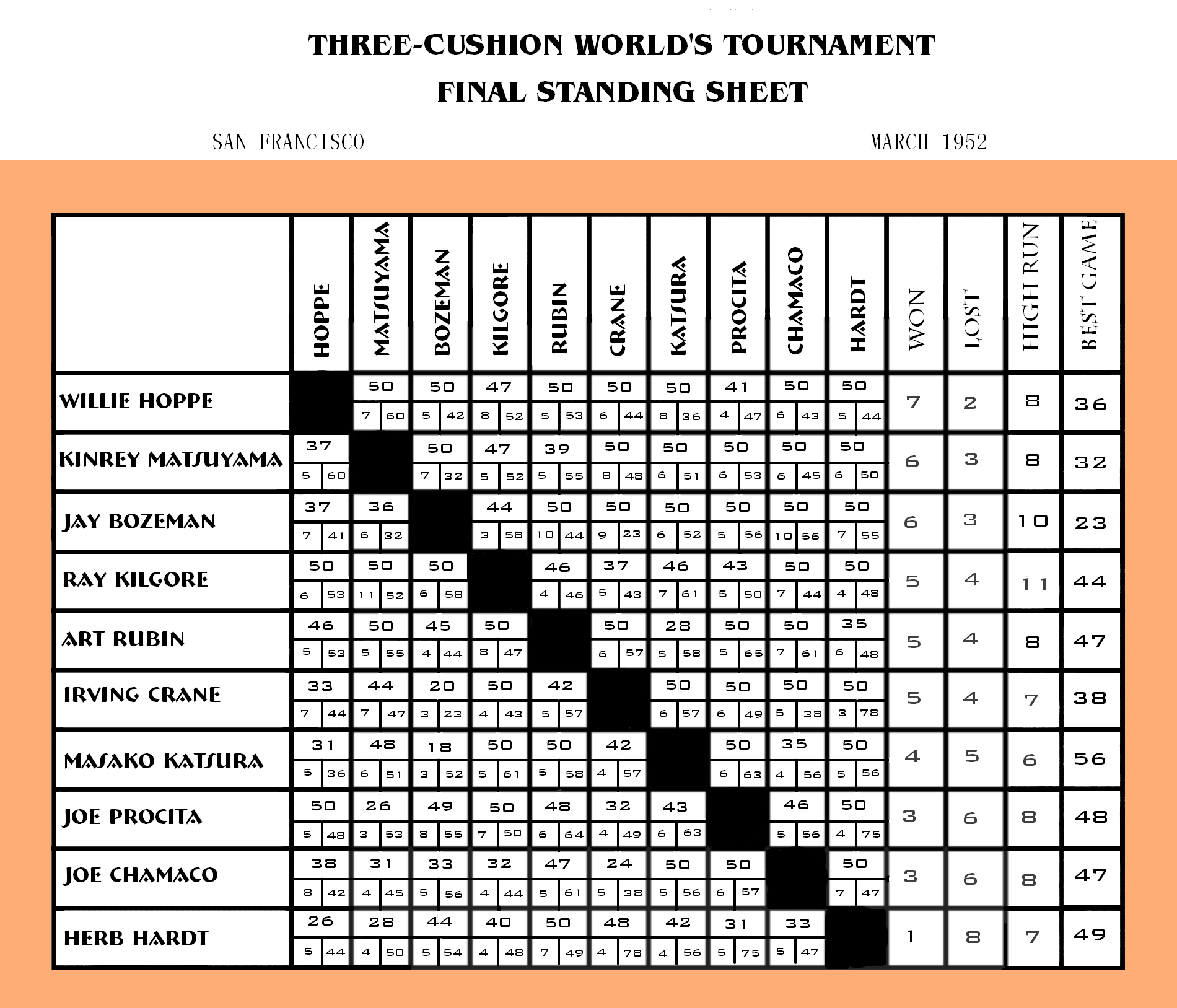
Chart recording final standings for the 1952 World Three-Cushion tournament. The form emulates that of the original handwritten chart used at the tournament. The three numbers in each box are read as follows: the top number is the points scored by the player; at bottom right is the number of innings; at bottom left is the player's high run.

On 18 March Katsura trounced Art Rubin 50–28 in 58 innings. but was handed a worse defeat in her next match on 20 March, losing to Bozeman 50 to 18 in 52 innings. In her last match on 21 March, Katsura pulled off a 50–46 win against Kilgore in 61 innings. This was the biggest upset of the tournament. Kilgore, the "Giant Killer", was the only player other than Matsuyama who was considered to have a fighting chance at dethroning Hoppe. Between this win and her earlier win over Procita, Katsura had beaten the only two players in the tournament that had won their matches against Hoppe. That evening a separate exhibition match between Katsura and Kilgore was featured on KRON-TV, with commentary provided by Cochran. The next day the tournament concluded with Hoppe repeating as champion as he had so many times before. Katsura took seventh place, ahead of Procita at eighth place, Chamaco at ninth and Rubin at tenth. Above her were Crane at sixth, Rubin at fifth, Kilgore at fourth, Bozeman at third and Matsuyama as runner-up.

Following the competition, Jay Bozeman, said "We've found it hard to believe that a woman could actually step into the best billiard championship in the world and hold her own. Miss Katsura is one of the finest players I've faced in a world's tournament", while Welker Cochran, five-time holder of the Billiards World Crown, predicted: "Given another two or three years of American competition and she will be the world's champion.... Masako has opened a new field for women. Her presence has made the game attractive to women for the first time. She has the power of a man and strokes beautifully. Her maneuvers with the cue ball are fantastic. All she needs is a bit more experience and she will be unbeatable."

== Exhibition tours ==
Masako Katsura was the greatest thing that ever happened in the whole history of billiards... maybe the greatest thing that ever happened period. For a woman to compete on absolutely equal terms with men... and a cute, feminine woman, at that... why, it's never been done before or since. She was not competing against just any men, understand, she was competing against the greatest players in the world. She was a sensation. People who had never heard of billiards before stood in line around the block for tickets to see her perform.

— Danny McGoorty, as quoted in Robert Byrne's McGoorty: A Pool Room Hustler (1972)

Soon after the 1952 championship, Cochran announced he was coming out of a seven-year retirement to play an exhibition tour with Katsura. "Millions of fans want to see this charming first lady of billiards" he said, "now some of them can." The duo previewed their tour with a three-day engagement at the Garden City Parlor in San Jose starting on 18 April 1952. Thereafter, they planned stops in Kansas City (2–3 May); Chicago (5–11 May); Detroit in mid-May; and on to tentative stops in Cleveland, Buffalo, Boston, Philadelphia, Dallas, San Diego, Los Angeles and Long Beach. The format was to be a 100-point straight-rail match, followed by a 50-point three-cushion game played under tournament conditions with trick or "fancy" shots to follow. Katsura stated prior to departing: "I hope my tour will convince women that billiards is not only a man's game. Women can play just as well as men."

Billiards champion Tex Zimmerman (Cochran's partner in the 924 Club) and well known pool hustler Danny McGoorty had a hand in organizing the tour. In preparation, they played up Katsura's exoticness and her physical attractiveness. Tex Zimmerman's wife sewed tight-fitting kimono for Katsura, slit up the side, which she wore during her exhibitions with high heels. Katsura was a tiny woman, weighing between 88 and 96 pounds. and standing 5 feet tall—just about the height of a standard cue stick. McGoorty later mused: "Masako was cute! She was thirty-nine years old but she looked twenty-nine. She hopped around that table on her high heels, giving the fans a little smile, and everybody loved her."

It was Katsura's playing ability, though, rather than her other charms, that made her a phenomenon. When Cochran returned from his tour with Katsura he told McGoorty, who was a world class player in his own right, "you will have trouble with her." When they finally got a chance to play, the match drew crowds. "They could have sold seats in the toilet!" McGoorty exclaimed. After the match, McGoorty confirmed Cochran's prediction:

I had trouble with her. I played hard and I threw her all the dirtiest stuff I knew, and I was lucky to win five out of the ten games. If you had the slightest idea of easing up on her because she was only a cute little girl, you were dead. She would murder you. I found out damn quick you could not leave her an open shot. If you did she would take those balls away from you and stick them right up your pooper. The killer instinct—that broad had it, and never mind the little smile.

A number of pre-booked stops on the tour suffered from lack of attendance. Cochran was very bitter about it. NEA sports editor, Harry Grayson indicated that the game was in general decline, and said that Cochran "traces the decline of championship and exhibition billiards to manufacturers taking the stars off the payroll during the depression." In a previous exhibition tour by Cochran and Hoppe in 1945, they had sold out in 13 cities. Despite some lackluster stops, upon her return to California, Katsura continued to play exhibition matches with the game's greats. Katsura and Kilgore put on a week-long exhibition in San Francisco in January 1953, where they seesawed back and forth. On 12 January, Katsura beat Kilgore in their first match with runs of seven and ten, but lost to him in their second. The total points scored by the two at that time was 349 for Katsura to Kilgore's 379.

Katsura started another exhibition series with Cochran at his club in February 1953 and, tuning up for the 1953 world tournament, to start on 26 March, went on a nationwide tour with Willie Hoppe in the latter part of February 1953. The 30-day tour of the northeastern U.S. included Chicago, Boston and other locations. Her husband accompanied her to provide translation. In their multiple-day exhibition match in Chicago, it was reported in the midst that Katsura had unsurprisingly won only one out of four matches against Hoppe, often pegged as the greatest player of all time.

== 1953–1954 ==
=== 1953 World Three-Cushion tournament ===
With Hoppe retired as of 1952, there was excitement over who would take the 1953 world three-cushion crown, to be held in Chicago at the Chicago Town Club in the Sheraton Hotel. Eleven competitors were slated to play, many repeats of the prior year, including Chamaco, Katsura, Matsuyama, Bozeman, Kilgore, Procita and Rubin. New to the field were Harold Worst of Grand Rapids, Hollywood's John Fitzpatrick, Mel Lundberg of Minneapolis and Ezequiel Navarra of Argentina. Navarra was considered the favorite by experts, having won championships that year in Cuba, Colombia, Peru and Argentina and having just come off an exhibition tour with Cochran in which Navarra averaged a formidable 1.16, scoring 1,295 three-cushions in 1,120 innings over the length of the tour.

In Katsura's first match she defeated Lundberg 50–44, in 71 innings. Thereafter she: lost to Matsuyama 50 to 37 in 39 innings; lost to Rubin, 50–37, in 52 innings; beat Fitzpatrick 50–38 in 50 innings, undefeated to that point; beat Chamaco 50 to 44, in 56 innings with a high run of eight; upset favorite Navarra 50 to 40 in 43 innings; followed by a loss to Kilgore, 50 to 41, in 42 innings; and a loss to Harold Worst 50 to 42, in 52 innings; but then defeated Bozeman 50–48 in 60 innings in her last match. When the dust had settled, Katsura shared fifth place with Matsuyama, each having won and lost five matches. The winner of the world crown was Kilgore with an eight-win, two-loss record. Navarra and Bozeman tied for second.

=== Exhibitions and death of Matsuyama ===
Advertisement for a Katsura vs. Matsyama [sic] exhibition to be held on 22 April 1953, in a Long Beach, California, billiard parlor

After the 1953 championship wrapped up, Katsura and Matsuyama gave an exhibition together in Long Beach, California (advertisement at right). The format was 100 points at balkline, followed by a race to 40 at three-cushion and then a trick shot exhibition. Katsura crushed her teacher, 100–11 and 100–3 at balkline, but Matsuyama won both the three-cushion matches, 40–34 and 40–39. This was Katsura and Matsuyama's last close interaction. After returning to Japan, Matsuyama suffered a heart attack and died on 20 December 1953. He had had plans to move to Honolulu with his family, become an American citizen, and purchase a billiard parlor. His eldest son, Hideo, 18, was attending a San Francisco high school at the time. He was said to have taught all of Japan's top players, among which Katsura was the star pupil.

Next, Katsura played a five-day, 600 point three-cushion exhibition series with Ray Kilgore in San Francisco, 12–17 March 1953. At the end Kilgore was the winner with a final score of 600 to 547. Kilgore said: "She played really remarkable billiards and I played a little over my head." The next week Katsura faced Kilgore again in another exhibition at Welker Cochran's room, beating him 50–33 in 45 innings.

=== 1954 World Three-Cushion tournament ===
The 1954 World Three-Cushion tournament was held in Buenos Aires with only 8 contestants: Katsura; Ray Miller of Jackson, Michigan; Harold Worst; Argentinian brothers Juan and Ezequiel Navarra; Welker Cochran, who had come out of retirement; Chamaco; and defending champion, Kilgore. As usual, Katsura was the sole female contestant.

In her first round she was victorious over Miller, 60–47 in 76 innings, then beat Chamaco 60–55, but followed with a loss to Ezequiel Navarra 60–28 in 48 innings. Katsura then beat his brother, Juan Navarra, 60–52 in 77 innings in her last match to take fourth place overall. On the last day Harold Worst and Ezequiel Navarra ended in a tie with a playoff to be held initially to 60 points, later raised to a 350 point format, at which Worst ultimately prevailed on 25 October 1954.

== 1955–1961 ==
=== Hiatus and exhibition ===
Little was seen of Katsura for the next few years. She made 30 exhibition appearances in 1958 but had been in "virtual retirement" for about five years. During this break the second of Katsura's two billiards instruction books came out in Japan: 撞球上達法 (1956) ("Improve Your Billiards"). An earlier primer, 撞球入門 ("Introduction to Billiards"), was published in 1952. In 1959 it was announced that Katsura and Harold Worst would compete in a one week exhibition match to 1,200 points, beginning 9 February at Randolph Recreations in Chicago. Worst and Katsura moved their show to Philadelphia next where they played six matches at three-cushion billiards to 50 points, and thereafter went to exhibit in New York.

=== TV spots ===
On 1 March 1959, Katsura appeared on CBS' popular primetime television show, What's My Line? The show was in the format of a guessing game, in which a panel attempted to determine the line (occupation), or in the case of a famous "mystery guest", the identity of the contestant. After she signed in using Japanese characters on a chalk board, show officials listed Katsura's occupation for the audience as "Professional Billiard Player (World's Women's Champion)". Panelist Arlene Francis was successful in guessing Katsura's occupation, though she admitted that she had read about her but said she had never seen her picture. Later that month Katsura made a guest appearance on ABC's You Asked For It, going behind the scenes of westerns to show how television productions set up and filmed a covered wagon rolling over and crashing on cue. She appeared again on You Asked For It in a 25 November 1960 broadcast, this time operating in her bailiwick, demonstrating trick shots for the camera.

=== 1961 title match with Worst ===
By 1961 and for a few years prior, there was no longer an organized world three-cushion championship. Accordingly, Harold Worst, the reigning champion since 1954, issued a challenge match to Katsura to defend his title, with the match to take place 13–18 March of that year at the Pantlind Hotel in Grand Rapids, Michigan, for a purse of $2,000. The preceding year Worst had issued a similar title-defending challenge to Joe Chamaco of Mexico, which also took place in Grand Rapids at the same venue. Worst even took unsuccessful legal action to block an Argentinian three-cushion tournament, billed as a "world title" event, that was scheduled to overlap the dates of his title match with Katsura. Worst defeated Katsura in six out of seven matches, with total three-cushions scored between them, respectively, of 350 and 276. Meanwhile, Chamaco claimed the world crown as well, after winning the tournament in Argentina.

== After 1961 ==
Little was heard from Katsura for many years after the 1961 world championship. McGoorty lamented her retirement, stating various theories that he had heard bandied about in billiard circles, such as that her husband (who died in June 1967) kept her from playing for various reasons. In 1976, Katsura made an impromptu appearance at Palace Billiards in San Francisco. She borrowed a cue from someone present and proceeded to run 100 points at straight rail without problem. Pool and billiard author Robert Byrne wrote that after Katsura finished that performance "without a miss she smiled and bowed to the applauding crowd, stepping away from the spotlight, and disappeared forever from the American billiard stage". Katsura returned to Japan in or about 1990 to live with her sister, Noriko, where she said she planned to live out her days. Katsura died in 1995.

== Legacy ==
In September 2002 a memorial tournament for Katsura, billed as "Katsura Memorial: The First Ladies Three Cushion Grandprix", was held in Japan and aired on SKY PerfecTV!

On 7 March 2021, Katsura was featured in a Google Doodle on the search engine's home page, as part of its celebration of International Women's Day.

== Footnotes ==
1. As opposed to pocket billiards, commonly called pool. Carom billiards games are typically played on cloth-covered, 5 by 10 foot (approximately 1.5 × 3 m) pocketless tables with three balls used in the play of most games; two cue balls (one for each player), and a third ball. At their simplest, the object of carom games is to score points or "counts" by caroming one's own cue ball off both the opponent's cue ball and the third object ball on a single shot. The required manner this is to be done, e.g., whether a certain number of rails need to be contacted before hitting both object balls, or whether the balls must be moved to a different area of the table after a set number of shots, generally separates one carom game from another.
2. In straight rail, the object of the game is simply to carom one's cue ball off both object balls, with no restrictions on the manner this may be accomplished, such as a number of rails required to be struck before the hit on the second ball (as in three-cushion or cushion caroms), or a limit on the number of points that may be scored while the balls are gathered in a demarcated area of the table (as in the balkline games). Astronomical high runs at straight rail are possible using nursing techniques, where the balls are manipulated in close quarters with the same or near the same position being replicated over and over. Though few have achieved such a rarefied run as 10,000 points, even that record has been doubled—Charles C. Peterson reportedly ran 20,000 points in the game in May 1935. The balkline games developed to curtail these seemingly endless and monotonous long runs, where an opposing player might "[sit] in a chair and [grow] a full beard waiting to play."
3. In three-cushion billiards, the object of play is to carom one's cue ball off both object balls with at least three rail cushions being struck before the cue ball contacts the second object ball. Three-cushion is a very difficult game, with an average of just one point per inning considered professional-level play. The high run at three-cushion billiards (number of points scored consecutively in a single inning) was for many years 25, set by Willie Hoppe in 1918 during an exhibition with Charles Peterson, later eclipsed by a 32-point high run by 23-time world champion, Raymond Ceulemans of Belgium.
