= Herb Hardt =

American carom billiards player

Herbert Hardt
- Born: Baby Graf; 27 November 1905; Chicago, Illinois, U.S.
- Died: 13 May 1978 (aged 72); Villa Park, Illinois
- Occupations: Billiards player, bank clerk
- Parent(s): Herman Graf (father), Henrietta Hansen (mother); adopted by William and Friederike Hardt as an infant

Herbert Hardt (born Graf; 27 November 1905 – 13 May 1978) was an American semi-professional carom billiards player from Chicago, Illinois. A bank clerk by day, Hardt took second place at the 1952 United States Eastern Regional Three-cushion Billiards Championship, thereby qualifying to play as one of ten contestants worldwide in the U.S.-hosted World Three-cushion Billiards Championship of the same year. Hardt came in dead last at the world championship, competing against the best players in the world.

== Early career ==
Hardt was born to German-Americans Herman Graf and Henrietta Hansen in Chicago, and adopted by German immigrants William and Friederike Hardt as an infant.

On February 18, 1932 it was reported that the prior night former national amateur champion, A. J. Harris had beaten Hardt 50 to 49 at three-cushion in Madison, Wisconsin.

In 1951 Herbt competed in the United States national billiards championship (three-cushion billiards) held in Chicago. On the first day of the tournament, February 16, 1951, Hardt beat Harold Worst 50-45 in 43 innings.

In February 1952 he was reported to be one of an eleven-man field playing in the Chicago sectional billiards tournament (three-cushion), and to have a 3–0 record at that time. The two winners of the tournament would graduate to the eastern regional championship, to be held in Buffalo, New York, in turn competing for a spot in the 1952 world tournament to be held in San Francisco, California where they would face defending champion, Willie Hoppe. Hardt made it to the Buffalo regional and won his first three matches in the round robin tournament, with only two more players in his path, including Irving Crane, six-time world champion at straight pool. Although Hardt thereafter lost twice to Crane—first to even the standings of the men, three wins to one loss each, and a second time in 50 to 35 in 71 innings—he sewed up second place for a spot in the world tournament.

== 1952 World Three-cushion Billiards Championship ==
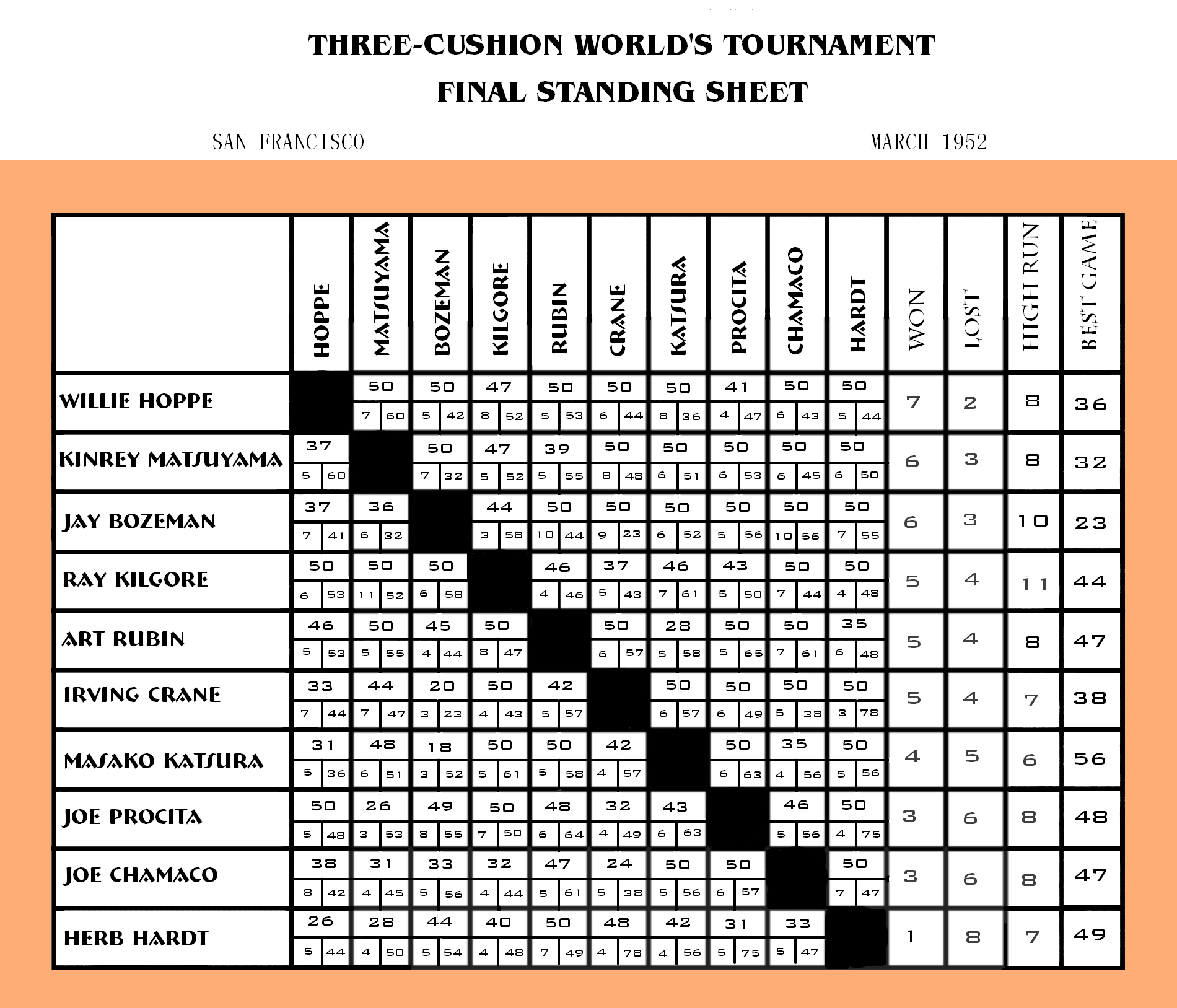
Chart recording final standings for the 1952 World Three-Cushion tournament. The form emulates that of the original handwritten chart used at the tournament. The three numbers in each box are read as follows: the top number is the points scored by the player; at bottom right is the number of innings; at bottom left is the player's high run.

The 1952 World Three-Cushion Billiards tournament was reported to have "The greatest billiard field since before World War II". First place earned a $2,000 purse, plus thousands in exhibition fees. Following behind to eight places were prizes of $1,000, $700, $500, $350, $300, $250 and $250 respectively.

The ten champions slated to play in the round robin format tourney to begin on March 6, 1952, were Hardt, Masako Katsura (first woman to ever play for any world billiard crown), Kinrey Matsuyama, favorite and defending champion Willie Hoppe, Mexican champion Joe Chamaco, New York's Art Rubin, Los Angeles' Joe Procita, Ray Kilgore of San Francisco, Jay Bozeman, of Vallejo and Binghamton's Irving Crane.

The championship between the invitees was to take place at Welker Cochran's 924 Club, with 45 total games to be played (each player to play every other once) over the 17-day tournament ending on March 22, 1952. Hardt came in dead last, winning only one game against Art Rubin with a final score of 50 to 35 in 49 innings.
