= William A. Spinks =

American professional billiards player and businessman (1865–1933)

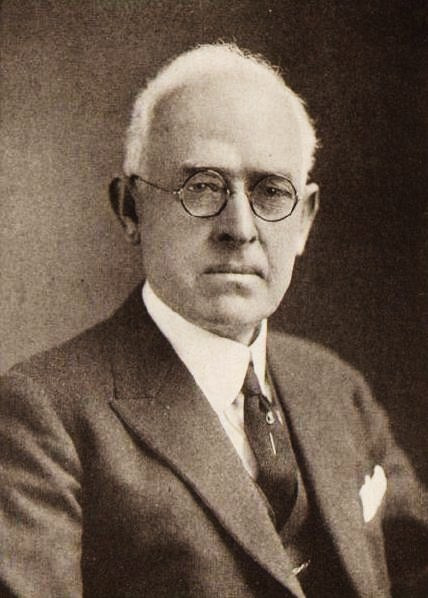
- Spinks in the January 1923 issue of Billiards Magazine
- Born: July 11, 1865; San Jose, California, US
- Died: January 15, 1933 (aged 67); Monrovia, California, US
- Occupations: Billiards player, inventor, sporting goods manufacturer, oil company investor/director, farmer/horticulturalist
- Years active: c. 1892–1920s
- Known for: Co-invention of billiard chalk; balkline billiards world record; the Spinks cultivar of avocado
- Title: Pacific Coast Billiard Champion
- Spouse: Clara A. (Karlson) Spinks (1891–1933)
- Awards: 18.2 balkline chuck nurse world record

William Alexander Spinks Jr. (July 11, 1865 – January 15, 1933) was an American professional player of carom billiards in the late 19th and early 20th centuries. He was often referred to as W. A. Spinks, and occasionally Billy Spinks. In addition to being amateur Pacific Coast Billiards Champion several times, a world-champion contender in more than one cue sports discipline, and an exhibition player in Europe, he became the co-inventor (with William Hoskins) of modern billiard cue chalk in 1897.

He was originally (and again in retirement from the billiards circuit) a Californian, but spent much of his professional career in Chicago, Illinois. At his peak, his was a household name in American billiards; The New York Times ranked Spinks as one of "the most brilliant players among the veterans of the game", and he still holds the world record for points scored in a row (1,010) using a particular shot type. Aside from his billiards-playing career, he founded a lucrative sporting goods manufacturing business. He was both an oil company investor and director, and a flower- and fruit-farm operator and horticulturist, originator of the eponymous Spinks cultivar of avocado.

== As an inventor (1892–97) ==
While Spinks was a world-class player, his lasting contributions to cue sports were the innovations he brought to the game and the industry resulting from his fascination with the abrasives used by players on the leather tips of their cue sticks.

Cue chalk (used since at least 1807) helps the tip better grip the cue ball on a stroke and prevents miscueing, as well as permitting the player to impart a great deal more spin to the ball, vital for position play and for spin-intensive shots, such as massés. In the 1800s, true chalk (generally calcium carbonate lumps, suspended from strings), and even plaster was often used, but players experimented with other powdery, abrasive substances, since true chalk had a deleterious effect on the game equipment, not only discoloring the billiard cloth but also allegedly damaging the fabric.

In 1892, Spinks was particularly impressed by a piece of natural chalk-like substance obtained in France, and presented it to chemist and electrical engineer William Hoskins (1862–1934) of Chicago for analysis. Hoskins determined it was porous volcanic rock (pumice) originally probably from Mount Etna, Sicily. Using the rock as a starting place, the two experimented together with different formulations of various materials to achieve the cue ball "action" that Spinks sought.

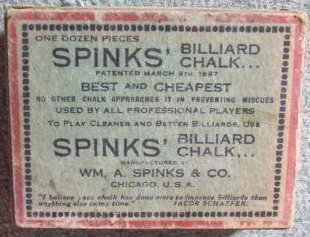
The top of a box of a dozen cubes of Spinks billiard chalk, c. 1900–1910; the box bears an endorsement by world champion Jacob Schaefer Sr., often Spinks's opponent as a touring pro.

They eventually narrowed their search to a mixture of Illinois-sourced silica and the abrasive substance corundum or aloxite (a form of aluminum oxide, Al_{2}O_{3}), founding William A. Spinks & Company with a factory in Chicago after securing a patent on March 9, 1897. Spinks later left the company as an active party, but it retained his name and was subsequently run by Hoskins, and later by Hoskins's cousin Edmund F. Hoskin, after Hoskins moved on to other projects.

While regular calcium carbonate chalk had been packaged and marketed on a local scale by various parties (English player Jack Carr's "twisting powder" of the 1820s being the earliest recorded example, although considered dubious by some billiards researchers), the Spinks Company product (which is still emulated by modern manufacturers with differing, proprietary compounds) effectively revolutionized billiards. The modern product provided a cue tip friction enhancer that allowed the tip to better grip the cue ball briefly and impart a previously unattainable amount of spin on the ball, which consequently allowed more precise and extreme cue ball control, made miscueing less likely, made curve and massé shots more plausible, and ultimately spawned the new cue sport of artistic billiards. Even the basic draw and follow shots of pool games (such as eight-ball and nine-ball) depend heavily on the effects and properties of modern billiard chalk.

Spinks made a fortune from his co-invention and the company that sold it to the world.

== As a player ==
Spinks was a formidable specialist and professional competitor in straight rail billiards, and later balkline billiards.

=== 1890s: Rise as a professional contender ===
He moved from California to the East Coast, as it was the center of high-quality American playing in the era. He began his competitive professional career in Brooklyn, New York, c. 1892, at about 27 years of age.

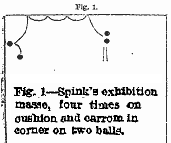
An extreme massé shot by Spinks during an 1893 exhibition game against Jacob Schaefer Sr. Starting from near the center of the table, his cue ball caroms off one object ball, then due to its extreme spin rebounds into the same cushion four times before finally rolling away for a perfect, scoring hit on the other ball near the upper left corner. But, Spinks lost this game.

On December 19, 1893, in Brooklyn, Spinks played in an exhibition that also featured the great Maurice Daly and young champion Frank Ives, and gave demonstrations of fancy massé shots (see illustration). He also played a 14.2 balkline match against World Champion Jacob Schaefer Sr.; Schaefer won, 250–162, with a high run and average of 88 and 20 (respectively) to Spinks's 33 and 13.

In 1894, he was living in Cincinnati, Ohio, and in January of that year offered a convoluted challenge to veteran cueist Edward McLaughlin of Philadelphia, Pennsylvania, to play him either a single 14.2 match to 600 points for US$500 each (a substantial amount of money in that period for someone to put up personally on a bet – approximately $18,171 in modern dollars) in New York City, or one in New York and one in Philadelphia, or one in Cincinnati and one in Philadelphia, whatever McLaughlin preferred, and even offered to pay travel expenses to Cincinnati.

Spinks issued an even more curious challenge in November 1894, to play 14.2 balkline against (almost) any challenger to 600 points for a $1,000 pot again, and while including French champion Edward Fournil, the bet specifically excluded the top-three names in that era of the sport, namely Shaefer, Ives and George Franklin Slosson. The challenge was accepted by well-known Chicago pro Thomas Gallagher (in a match that future champion Ora Morningstar traveled all the way to Chicago to see).

Spinks was apparently not a fan of upstart cueist Ives in particular. Days after issuing his caveat-laden challenge, Spinks was described by an onlooking journalist as "very uneasy until the seventeenth inning" as a spectator at the 14.2 balkline World Champion challenge match between Ives and incumbent Schaefer; the latter's point total had been trailing, sometimes badly, in all sixteen previous innings until he rallied in the final inning of the game. Spinks, along with Gallagher, even helped Schaefer train in 14.2 for another match against Ives, in October of that year; though Spinks lost this practice match 600–369 (averages 23 vs. 14), he had a high run of 109, to Schaefer's 102 (and Gallagher's 157 total).

Spinks was reported in the press in 1895 to be specifically desired as a competitor in an upcoming seven-man invitational tournament for "second class" professional players (i.e., not the top 3), organized by Daly, and with as much as $1,200 (approx. $45,355 in modern dollars) added.

Spinks had moved to Chicago by 1896, and was perfecting his billiard chalk with Hoskins. That year he was noted for besting McLaughlin at 14.2 by a comfortable 2500–2300 margin (with averages of 11 vs. 10) in a five-evening 14.2 match for $250 (approx. $9,449, in modern dollars), December 8–12, in Slosson's New York City billiard hall. At one point he had trailed rather badly, 1500–1880, after McLaughlin pulled off a stunning run of 140 (Spinks's highest recorded run of the match was 69).

By 1897, the year of the launch of Spinks & Company, he had evidently overcome his seeming reluctance to face World Champions again (perhaps from having several years' experience with his own product prototypes). Spinks competed in (but did not win) a December 3 open tournament.

The next month in Chicago, on January 15–21, 1898, there was a double-elimination, five-man invitational 18.2 balkline tournament. It was a handicapped event, featuring the five top players from the previous event – Schaefer and Ives, as world champions, had to reach 600 points to Spinks's, William Catton's and George Butler Sutton's 260. Without having to rely on the handicap, Spinks beat Schaefer flat-out, 260–139 (with a high run of 48 vs. Schaefer's 38) in his January 18 second game. Spinks (with a high run of "only" 44) was defeated in a very close 249–260 third game a day later by Catton (high run 56) – by way of comparison, the same night Ives trounced Sutton by a whopping 400–160. By January 20, Spinks seemed to be running out of steam, as Sutton took him 260–118, (high runs 73 vs. 30), and he lost again 154–400 (with another high run of 44) to Ives a day later. (In Spinks's defense, he not only did better against Ives than Catton had, but Ives also had a very impressive high run of 136, making it virtually impossible to catch up.) This loss put Spinks out of the tournament at fourth place.

=== 1900s: World-class competitor ===
Spinks was still considered a newsworthy contender over a decade later, for the World 18.2 Balkline Championship of 1909, being enumerated in "a fine list of entries" anticipated for the March event.

On January 11, Spinks (with a high run of 51) beat former amateur champion and then-pro Calvin Demarest, 250–199, in only 15 innings – despite scoring 0 points in 4 innings and only 1-point in another – by building several solid runs in the innings in which things went his way. For all intents and purposes it was a 10-inning win. Demarest took his revenge only days later, defeating Spinks in a close 250–225, 23-inning game on January 13, despite Spinks's high run of 78 (his highest 18.2 run on record in publicly available sources, and considerably higher than Demarest's 52 that night). Spinks lost to him again the very next day, 175–250, in an exhibition game, though Spinks had a solid high run of 69.

In January 1909, just prior to an 18.1 balkline championship at Madison Square Garden (in which Spinks was not competing), he and Maurice Daly were observed playing practice games with Sutton for the latter's pre-event training, in Daly's billiard hall in New York City, on multiple occasions over a several-day stretch. While Spinks lost all but one of the recorded matches of this series, one loss was by a single point, at 400–399, and another was a close 400–370. His victory was 300–194 – surprising given that 18.1 was not his preferred game.

Many articles of the era stress that Spinks was a Californian; during this period, American billiards was completely dominated by East-Coasters and a few Midwesterners.

=== 1910s–1920s: Setting a record and helping level the field ===
Spinks was noted in 1912 for a still-unbroken world record at 18.2 balkline, a run of 1,010 continuous points, using the "chuck nurse" (a form of nurse shot); he could have made more, but stopped. Later, anchor space rules were instituted especially to curtail the effectiveness of the chuck nurse. The use of such repetitive, predictable shots by Spinks, Schaefer Sr., and their contemporaries led to the development of the more advanced and restrictive 14.1 balkline rules (invented in 1907, but not played professionally until 1914), which thwarted the ease of reliance on nurse shots even further than the older balkline games already did.

In August 1915, Spinks was tapped to join a consultative panel of notable players and major billiard hall proprietors to help develop a new handicapping system for balkline billiards, organized by the Brunswick-Balke-Collender Company, at that time the organizers of the World Championships. The inspiration for the new system was simply making it possible for the newly ascendant Willie Hoppe to be meaningfully challenged – his near-unassailability was hurting billiard tournament revenues, because the outcome was considered foreordained by many potential ticket-buyers. The system was expected to level the playing field in other ways, especially making it easier for skilled amateurs to enter the professional ranks.

Well into the 1920s, Spinks was still a well-respected figure in the billiards industry, and wrote articles for publications such as Billiards Magazine, in which he sometimes focused on rather esoteric topics, as in his January 1923 piece on "Ventilation of Billiard Rooms" in an era when tobacco smoking was prevalent.

== As an oilman and farm operator ==
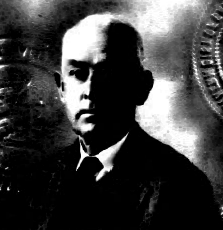
Spinks in 1924 (passport photo from U.S. Department of State microfilm)

He invested money from his billiard equipment corporation in the petroleum industry in California. Spinks described himself as a director of an oil company at the 1900 census.

While Spinks was not known to have been operating a farm in 1900, the W. A. Spinks Ranch was a large enough operation by 1909 to employ a staff of farmhands, and included land in Bradbury Canyon, near Duarte, California, where Spinks resided at the time. He described himself as a flower farmer (among other such specialists in the area) in 1910, and later as an "avocado rancher". As a pomology horticulturist, he developed the Spinks avocado cultivar. Spinks was active in the growers' community, and in 1922 hosted a large regional farm bureau meeting of avocado farmers at his ranch-land "mountain estate". Although active as a floriculturist, Spinks made no known lasting contributions to that field.

=== Spinks avocado ===
Spinks's variety of avocado, Persea americana 'Spinks', was developed by him at his Duarte ranch between 1910 and 1920. In 1920, Spinks provided a supply of his avocados for a University of California at Berkeley and California Avocado Association comparison of avocado strains. The Spinks avocado fruit was shown to be more resistant to freezing than other avocados. It also proved to be the second-longest-lasting in storage out of the ten varieties tested.

Considered "famous" by 1918, the Duarte-based Spinks avocado orchards were contracted to supply seedlings in 1919 for the palace of Xu Shichang, President of the Republic of China, and other prestigious gardens in Asia. The Spinks varietal was eventually supplanted in popularity by the Hass avocado, the dominant commercial strain today.

== Private life ==
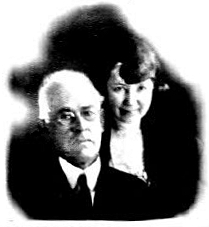
William and Clara Spinks in 1922 (passport photo from U.S. Department of State microfilm)

William A. Spinks Jr., the youngest of five children, was born July 11, 1865, in the then-small township of San Jose, California, to struggling farmer William Sr. and wife Cynthia J. (Prather) Spinks. He had blue eyes, dark hair and a ruddy complexion, and was 5 feet 8 inches (1.73 m) tall by adulthood. His education is obscure.

On September 1, 1891, Spinks married Clara Alexandria Karlson (b. December 12, 1871, Gothenburg, Sweden, immigrated 1872; died October 4, 1949, Los Angeles); they were to remain together for over 40 years. They returned to California from Chicago before the turn of the century. After a period in a San Francisco apartment (c. 1900), they lived in the then-rural Los Angeles suburbs of Duarte (c. 1910) where their farm was, and Monrovia (later, by 1920) where they maintained a modest house. After William's business success, the couple became extensive world travelers.

William Spinks died January 15, 1933, aged 67, in Monrovia, California. In Los Angeles County's San Gabriel Valley, Spinks Canyon, its stream Spinks Canyon Creek, and the local major residential thoroughfare Spinks Canyon Road (running through Duarte's northernmost residential area, Duarte Mesa), are named after him.
