= List of world three-cushion billiards champions =

The World Three-Cushion Championship is a billiards competition held in the Americas. It was the most prestigious Three-cushion tournament up until the UMB World Three-cushion Championship popularized Three-cushion in Europe. The event was held in United States and from 1928 ran alongside the UMB World Three-cushion Championship, both as World Championship events. By the 1950s, the popularity of three-cushion had declined in the US following the retirement of Willie Hoppe.

== History ==
The first three-cushion billiards tournament took place at Mussey’s Billiard Hall in the United States in 1878. The winner was Leon Magnus, who received a cash prize of $75 (equivalent to $2,274 in 2023). However, fans of cue sports were not immediately taken with the new sport of three-cushion billiards. This lack of popularity resulted in a lull in the occurrence of additional tournaments in the United States for several years. In the subsequent decades, the tournament was held only once in 1899 and was won by William Catton.

The popularity of three-cushion billiards increased with the introduction of the Lambert Trophy in 1907. To win this trophy, a player had to defeat others in a knockout-style tournament. Harry Cline was the first winner of the Lambert Trophy. Around this time, less formal tournaments also became popular, especially in the United States. These were designed for both amateur and professional players, with the winner receiving a trophy or cup. Tournaments took place in billiard parlours with proprietors using posters to advertise the tournament events.

== Winners ==
In the 1870s, Wayman McCreery invented the game of three-cushion.

Sanctioned World Championship events

NBAA- National Billiard Association of America (1921 to 1942)
BAA- Billiard Association of America (1944 to 1947)
BCA- Billiard Congress of America (1947 to 1961)

Year	Winner	Runner-up
1921	(United States) August Kieckhefer	(Cuba) Alfredo De Oro
1921	(United States) August Kieckhefer	(United States) Johnny Layton
1922	(United States) Johnny Layton	(Cuba) Alfredo De Oro
1922	(United States) Johnny Layton	(United States) Charles McCourt
1923	(United States) Tilford Denton	(United States) Otto Reiselt
1924	(United States) Robert Cannefax	(United States) Johnny Layton
1927	(United States) August Kieckhefer	(United States) Otto Reiselt
1927	(United States) Otto Reiselt	(United States) August Kieckhefer
1927	(United States) Otto Reiselt	(United States) Gus Copulos
1927	(United States) Otto Reiselt	(United States) Allen Hall
1928	(United States) Otto Reiselt	(United States) Tilford Denton
1928	(United States) Johnny Layton	(United States) Willie Hoppe
1930	(United States) Johnny Layton	(United States) Otto Reiselt
1931	(United States) Arthur Thurnblad	(United States) Allen Hall
1932	(United States) August Kieckhefer	(United States) Otto Reiselt
1933	(United States) Welker Cochran	(United States) Jay Bozeman
1934	(United States) Johnny Layton	(United States) Allen Hall
1935	(United States) Johnny Layton	(United States) Allen Hall
1935	(United States) Welker Cochran	(United States) Willie Hoppe
1936	(United States) Willie Hoppe	(United States) Welker Cochran
1936	(United States) Welker Cochran	(Japan) Kinrey Matsuyama
1938	(France) Roger Conti	(United States) Welker Cochran
1939	(Mexico) Joe Chamaco	(United States) Raymond Champanioni
1940	(United States) Willie Hoppe	(United States) Jake Schaefer Jr.
1941	(United States) Willie Hoppe	(United States) Jake Schaefer Jr.
1941	(United States) Willie Hoppe	(United States) Jake Schaefer Jr.
1942	(United States) Willie Hoppe	(United States) Welker Cochran
1944	(United States) Willie Hoppe	(United States) Welker Cochran
1944	(United States) Welker Cochran	(United States) Willie Hoppe
1945	(United States) Welker Cochran	(United States) Willie Hoppe
1946	(United States) Willie Hoppe	(United States) Jake Schaefer Jr.
1947	(United States) Willie Hoppe	(United States) Arthur Rubin
1947	(United States) Willie Hoppe	(United States) Arthur Rubin
1948	(United States) Willie Hoppe	(Argentina) Enrique Navarra
1949	(United States) Willie Hoppe	(Mexico) Joe Chamaco
1950	(United States) Willie Hoppe	(Mexico) Joe Chamaco
1950	(United States) Willie Hoppe	(Mexico) Joe Chamaco
1951	(United States) Willie Hoppe	(Mexico) Joe Chamaco
1952	(United States) Willie Hoppe	(Japan) Kinrey Matsuyama
1953	(United States) Ray Kilgore	(United States) Jay Bozeman
1954	(United States) Harold Worst	(Argentina) Enrique Navarra
1957	(United States) Harold Worst	(Mexico) Joe Chamaco
1960	(United States) Harold Worst	(Mexico) Joe Chamaco
1961	(United States) Harold Worst	(Japan) Masako Katsura

== Top performers ==
Name	Nationality	Winner	Years a champion
Willie Hoppe	United States	15	12
Johnny Layton	United States	6	5
Welker Cochran	United States	5	5
Harold Worst	United States	4	4
Otto Reiselt	United States	4	2
August Kieckhefer	United States	4	3

- In the event of identical records, players are sorted in alphabetical order by first name.
