= Wayman C. McCreery =

American classical composer (1851–1901)

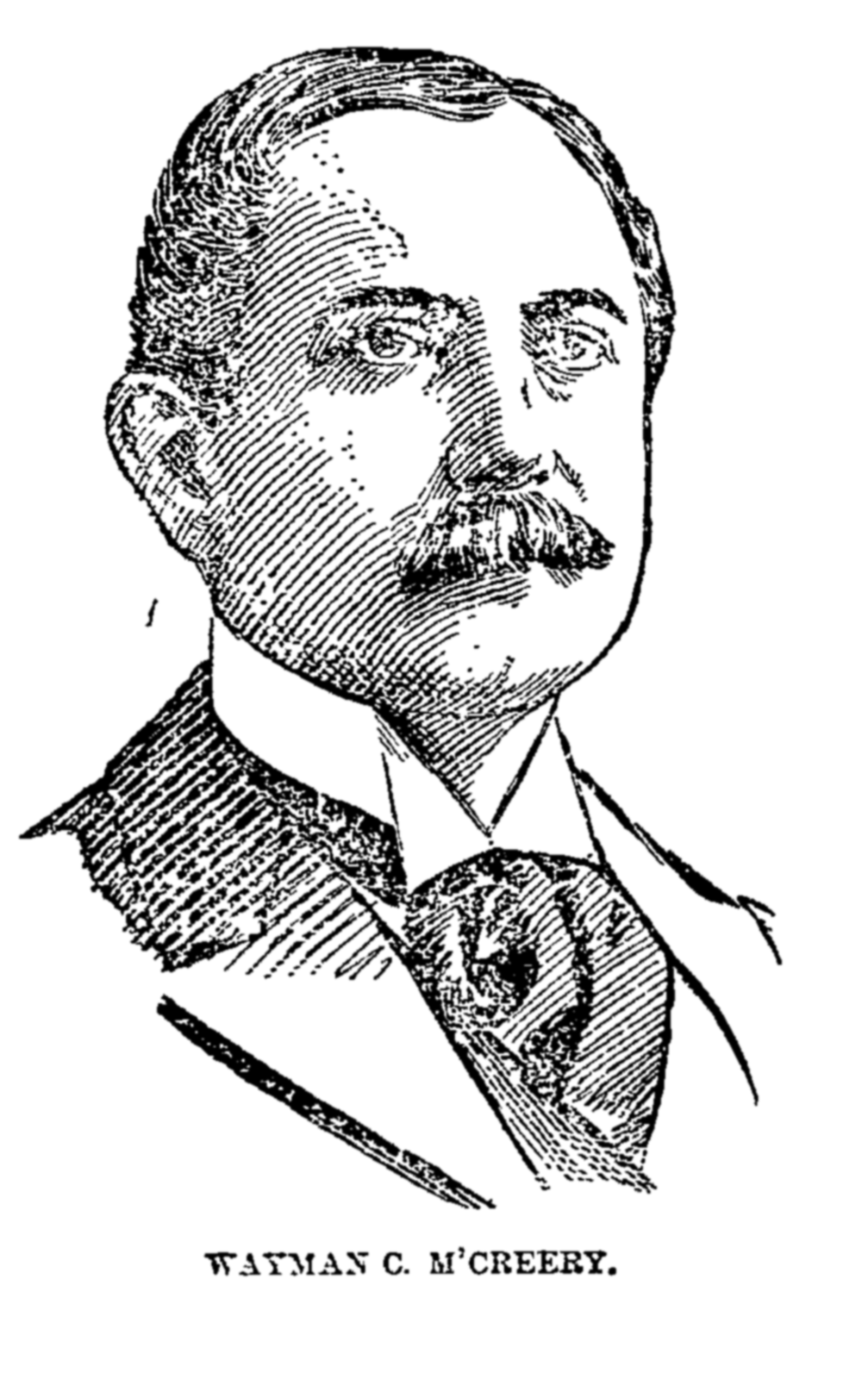
- McCreery in or about 1900 (Detail from February 6, 1900 edition of The Newark Daily Advocate)
- Born: June 14, 1851; St. Louis, Missouri
- Died: 1901; St. Louis, Missouri
- Other name: Wayman Crow McCreery
- Occupations: Billiards player, real estate agent, internal revenue collector of St. Louis, opera composer
- Known for: Popularizer and possible inventor of three-cushion billiards.

Wayman Crow McCreery (June 14, 1851 – 1901) was a real estate agent, opera composer, and the internal revenue collector of St. Louis, Missouri. He is best known as the popularizer and possible inventor of three-cushion billiards.

Soon after McCreery's 1897 appointment as St. Louis' internal revenue collector, he was described as "probably the most accomplished officeholder in the service of the government. He has held the college record for the long distance baseball throw, has been a champion amateur billiardist, is choirmaster of Christ Church Cathedral, is a good singer [and] has composed an opera."

Playwright Augustus Thomas' wrote of him in 1922:

A moving spirit in the McCullough Club—in its organization, its management, and in its active expression—was Wayman McCreery, now dead. I am sure that ten thousand of his surviving contemporaries in the city of St. Louis will remember Wayman McCreery. Few men are so physically and intellectually equipped as he was. There was nothing that an athlete could do with his body that in a notable degree Wayman McCreery could not do. He was boxer, wrestler, fencer, runner, and swimmer, and all-round athlete. In addition to these he was a graceful step dancer. Intellectually he was equipped with a college training and had an interest in everything that interested the intelligent people of his day. He sang well enough to be a leading tenor in a fashionable choir. He wrote music of good quality. He was the author of the opera "L'Afrique," which was first done by amateurs in St. Louis and subsequently produced in New York, although with not very great success, by Jesse Williams. McCreery will be remembered by the sporting world as the inventor of the three cushion game of billiards, of which he was at one time the national champion. As Hugh Chalcot in Robertson's comedy "Ours" it would have taken a professional to equal him. Another part of McCreery's was Captain Hawtree in "Caste," by the same author.

The very first tournament at three-cushion billiards took place January 14–31, 1878, in C. E. Mussey's Room in St. Louis. McCreery played in the tourney, which was won by New Yorker Leon Magnus. The high run for the tournament was just 6 points, and the high average a .75.

McCreery won the Amateur Championship of Missouri four straight times. He posted high runs during competition of 336 at straight rail; 54 at cushion caroms, and 14 at three cushion—in which his "remarkable skill has given him a worldwide reputation." In the estimation of Willie Hoppe, a 51-time world champion in three forms of carom billiards, McCreery was "one of the finest performers [at straight rail] in the country."

In February 1899, McCreery competed against Martin Mullen and Wilson P. Foss in the American Athletic Union's Class A Amateur Championship of America, at 14-point balkline held at New York City's Knickerbocker Club. They were described by the Brooklyn Daily Eagle as "without doubt the best three amateurs in the country". There, McCreery set two amateur world records: the first for a high run of 139 points in one game, and the second for maintaining a point average of 13.33, in the context of a race to 400 points.

McCreery was secretary of the Security Building Company.

McCreery composed a Te Deum Laudamus and the music to the libretto L'Afrique, also known as "the Tale of the Dark Continent".

McCreery was married and had three daughters and a son.

In August 2018, a 3-cushion tournament called "Champion of Champions" was organized under his name.

== Footnotes ==
1. Most balkline games have two-part numerical names, like 14.1 or 18.2 balkline. The first number indicates how far (in inches or centimeters, depending on whether of U.S. or European origin) balklines are drawn on the table parallel to the rail, thus defining the width of a balk space in which only a set number of caroms may be scored before at least one ball must leave the area—which restriction is indicted by the second number in the balkline variety name. After balkline gained popularity and players became proficient, run counts increased to such an extent that almost all balkline games set the restriction at either one or two – to increase the difficulty level and keep the game interesting for both players and spectators. The tournament described here was before these rule innovations had been settled, and the count restriction imposed for play there was ten, i.e., the variety would be described as "14.10 balkline" if named.
