= Jacob Schaefer Sr. =

American billiards player (1855–1910)

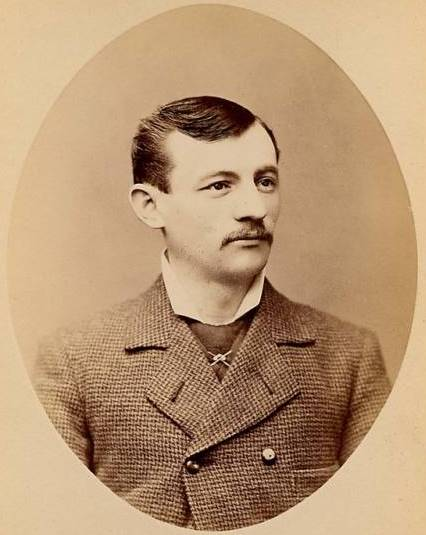
Jacob Schaefer Sr., circa 1880s

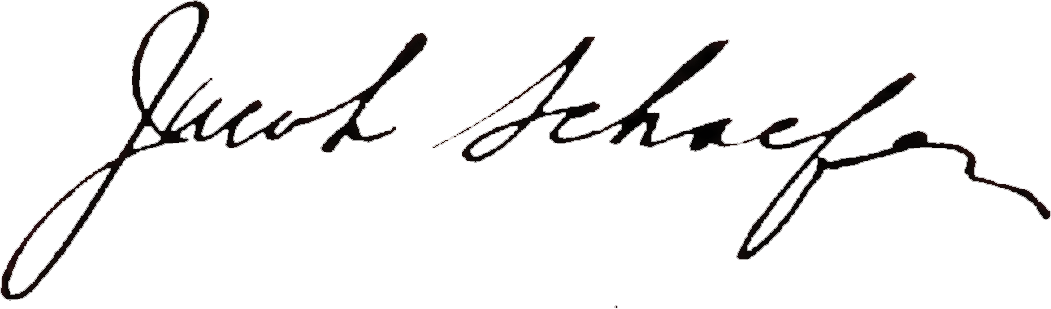
Signature of Jacob Schaefer

Jacob Schaefer Sr. (February 2, 1855 – March 8, 1910), nicknamed "The Wizard", was a professional carom billiards player, especially of the straight rail and balkline games, and was posthumously inducted into the Billiard Congress of America Hall of Fame in 1968.

Schaefer was born in 1855 in Milwaukee, Wisconsin. He was the first US-born son of German emigrants. He was the father of fellow billiards pro Jacob Schaefer Jr. (1894–1975).

Schaefer first started playing billiards at the age of eleven, at a billiard hall that was owned by his step-father John Berg. At the time of the 1870 United States census, he was listed as "Jacob Berg", aged fifteen at Leavenworth, Kansas, in the home of John Berg, who was a billiard hall owner. He was the best player in Leavenworth by the age of fifteen. Schaefer's debut as a professional player came in 1873. Before May 1874, he had become the champion of Kansas.

He became one of the world's top balkline players, to such an extent that some of the more challenging versions of balkline were invented to attempt to level the playing field against him. He won matches and titles around the world, including the March 11, 1908, World 18.1 Balkline Championship versus Willie Hoppe, although extremely ill, he won the match by 500 points to 423. He died of tuberculosis in 1910 in Denver, Colorado.

== Titles ==
- World Straight rail Championship (1879)
- World 14.2 Balkline Championship (1890–1892)
- World 18.1 Balkline Championship (1901, 1907, 1908)
