= Jacob Schaefer Jr. =

American billiards player (1894–1975)

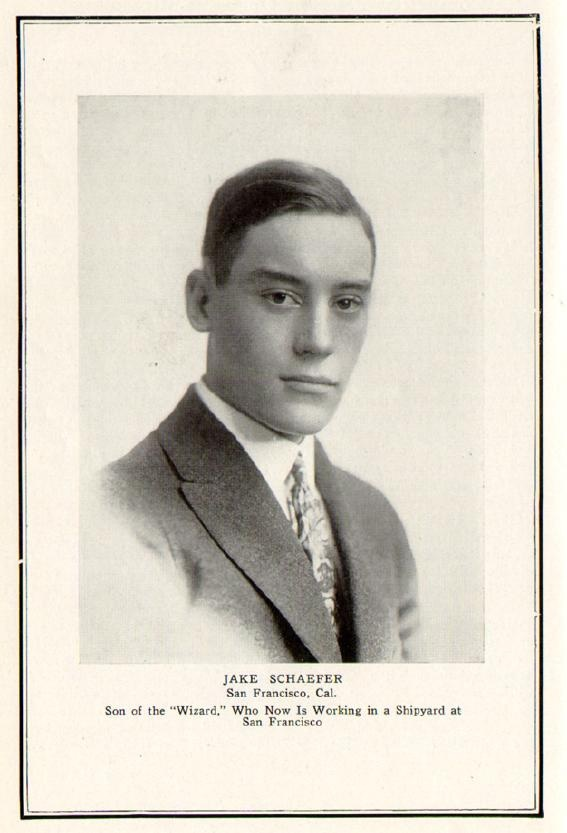

Jacob Schaefer Jr. (born October 18, 1894, in Chicago, Illinois; died November 10, 1975, in Cleveland, Ohio) was an American professional carom billiards player with German grandparentage, a specialist in balkline games, and was inducted into the Billiard Congress of America Hall of Fame in 1968. His nickname was "the Prodigy".

== Professional career ==
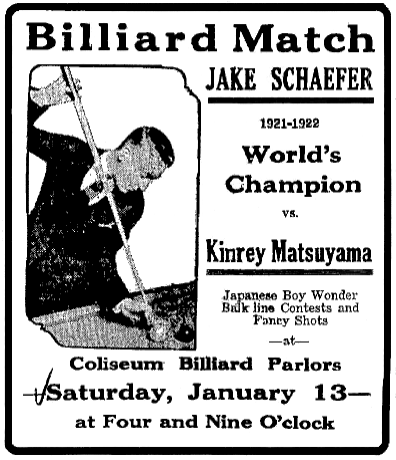
January 11, 1923, advertisement for a balkline match to be played between Schafer and Japanese champion, Kinrey Matsuyama

Schaefer is widely considered by historians of the sport to have been America's all-time greatest balkline player.

== Titles and tournament wins ==
- World 18.1 Balkline Champion (1921, 1923-1927, 1929, 1930)
- World 18.2 Balkline Champion (1927, 1928)
- World 28.2 Balkline Champion (1937, 1938)

== Records ==
In 18.2 balkline, Schaefer held four records never broken by another American (some have since been beaten by non-Americans):

- A 400-point game average (from the break)

400-0. The 1925 World Championship 18.2 Balkline Tournament was held in the Congress Hotel, Chicago. The sixth game of the tournament on Thursday evening, February 26, featured Jake Schaefer II against Erich Hagenlocher of Germany. Schaefer won the lag and shot first. He made 400 consecutive billiards and won the game. Hagenlocher was quoted later as saying that toward the end of the run he was hoping that Schaefer wouldn't miss. Hagenlocher was afraid that after sitting and watching for more than an hour, he wouldn't be able to stand up and hit the end rail.

- A 57.14 tournament grand average
- A 93.25 match grand average
- A high run of 432 in a match

== Personal life ==
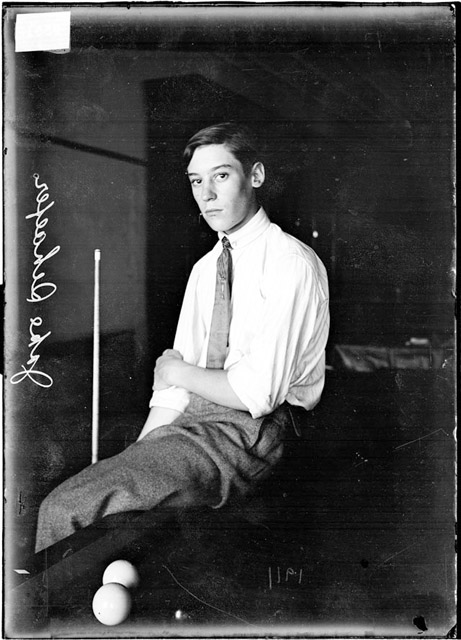

He was the son of fellow billiards pro Jacob Schaefer Sr. (1855–1910), who was known as "the Wizard" by reason of his exploits with the cue.

Both Jacob Jr. and Hoppe were tutored by the elder Schaefer, whose last match before his death was a successful defense of his title against Hoppe.

Jacob Schaefer III (b. 1938) and Jacob Schaefer IV (b. 1970) are both academics in science. Jacob Schaefer V (b. 2007) has not yet made a career decision.
