= Maurice Daly =

Maurice Daly may refer to:

- Maurice Daly (rugby union) (1914–1994), player of rugby union football, for both Ireland and British East Africa
- Maurice Daly (footballer), Irish international footballer from the 1970s
- Maurice F. Daly, American football player and United States Army Air Forces colonel
- Maurice Daly (billiards player), American carom billiards player, billiards hall and academy operator, tournament sponsor, and author

== See also ==
- Maurice Dalé, French footballer
