= Welker Cochran =

American billiards player (1897–1960)

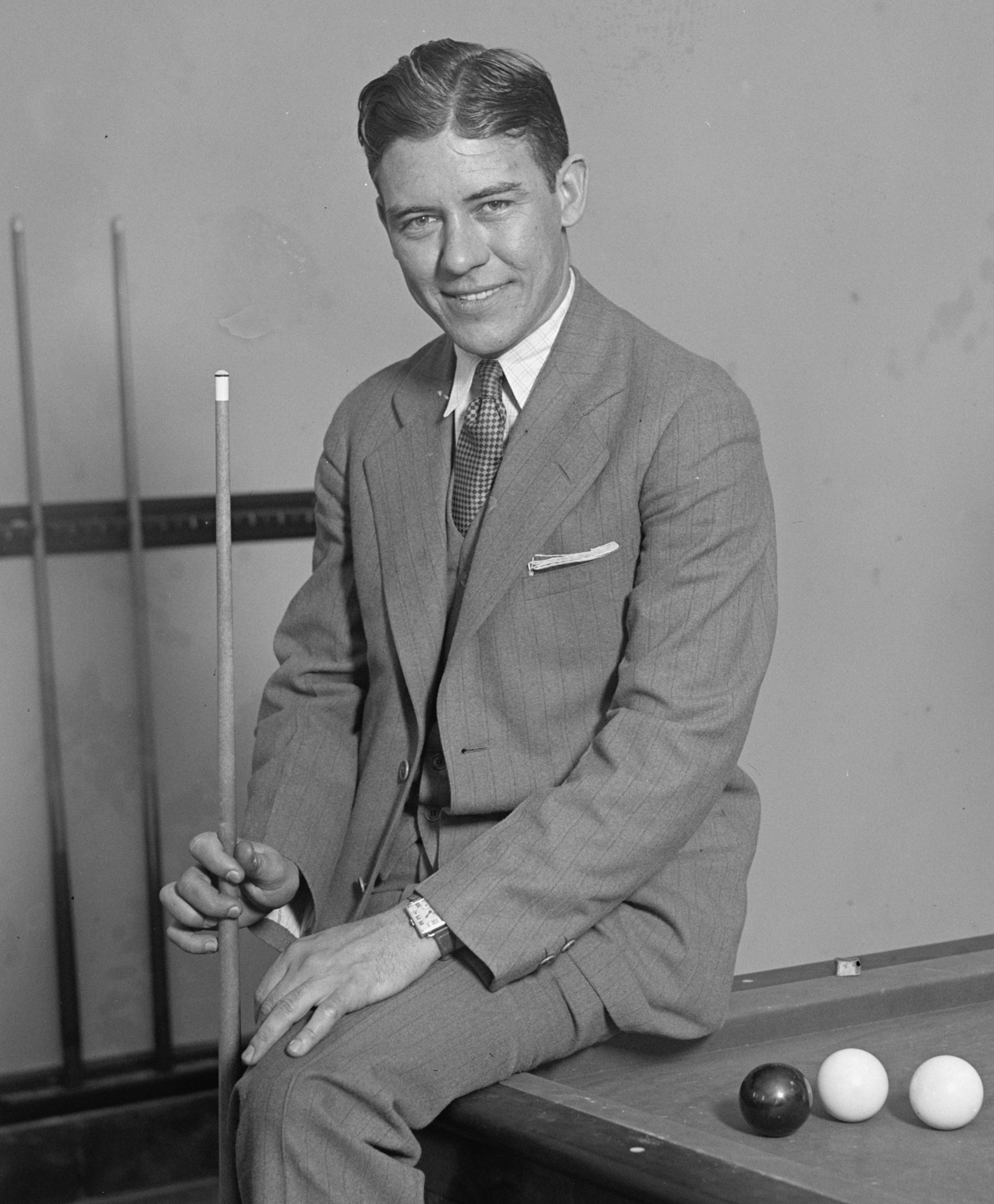
Cochran in 1927

Welker Cochran (October 7, 1897 – July 26, 1960) was an American professional carom billiards player who won world titles in two different disciplines, balkline and three-cushion billiards.

== Biography ==
He was born on October 7, 1897, in Des Moines, Iowa, but moved to Manson early. He began playing at a young age in a billiards parlor owned by his father in Manson, and by the age of 17 was among the best players in the world.

He won his first world title in 1927 in 18.2 balkline. The popularity of balkline faded in the late 1920s and early 1930s, causing Cochran to switch to three-cushion, in which he won his first world title in 1933. In 1945, Cochran set a new world record (now surpassed) by achieving a game average of 3 (60 points in 20 innings) in a match he won against Willie Hoppe. He retired from serious competition in 1946 due to arthritis, but did make a comeback attempt in 1954.

He died on July 26, 1960, in Belmont, California.

== Legacy ==
Cochran was inducted posthumously into the Billiard Congress of America's Hall of Fame in 1967.

== Titles and tournament wins ==
- World 18.2 Balkline Championship (1927, 1934)
- World Three-Cushion Championship (1933, 1935-1936, 1944-1945)
