= A Game of Billiards =

Painting by Louis-Léopold Boilly

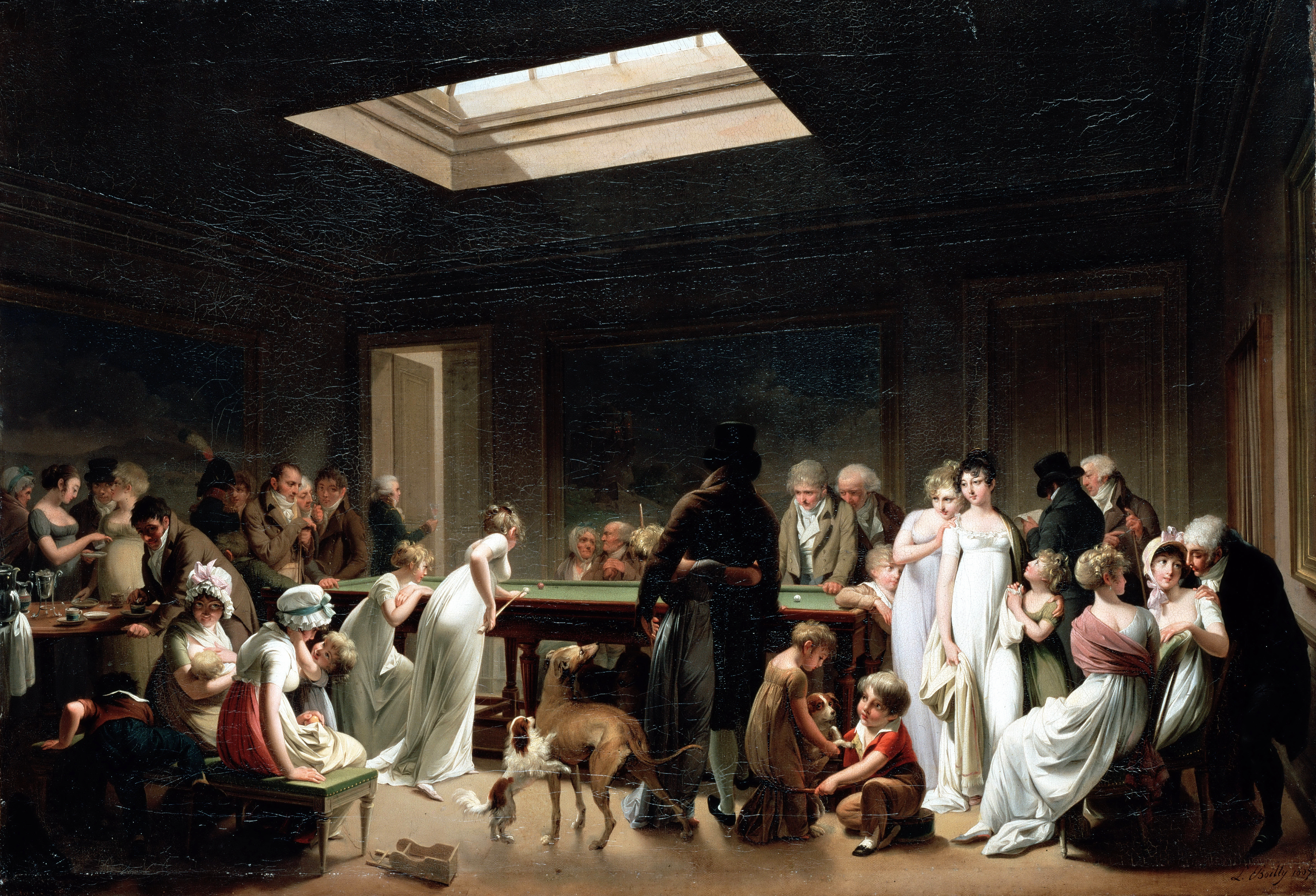
- Artist: Louis-Léopold Boilly
- Year: 1807
- Type: Oil on canvas, genre painting
- Dimensions: 56 cm × 81 cm (22 in × 32 in)
- Location: Hermitage Museum, Saint Petersburg

A Game of Billiards is an 1807 genre painting by the French artist Louis-Léopold Boilly. Produced during the Napoleonic era, it depicts a game of billiards taking place in Paris. It is unusual for the fact both men and women are depicting playing the game.

The painting has been described as Boilly's "most celebrated genre painting". It was exhibited at the Salon of 1808 at the Louvre where it received great acclaim. It was then purchased by the Russian diplomat and art collector Nikolay Yusupov on a visit to Paris. Today it is in the collection of the Hermitage Museum in Saint Petersburg.

== Bibliography ==
- Bailey, Colin B. The Age of Watteau, Chardin, and Fragonard: Masterpieces of French Genre Painting. Yale University Press, 2003.
- Conisbee, Philip. French Genre Painting in the Eighteenth Century. National Gallery of Art, 2007.
- MacDonald, Heather Eleanor (ed.) French Art of the Eighteenth Century. Yale University Press, 2016.
- Sterling, Charles. Great French Painting in the Hermitage. Abrams, 1958.
- Whitlum-Cooper, Francesca. Boilly: Scenes of Parisian Life. National Gallery Company, 2019.
