= One-cushion billiards =

Discipline of carom billiards

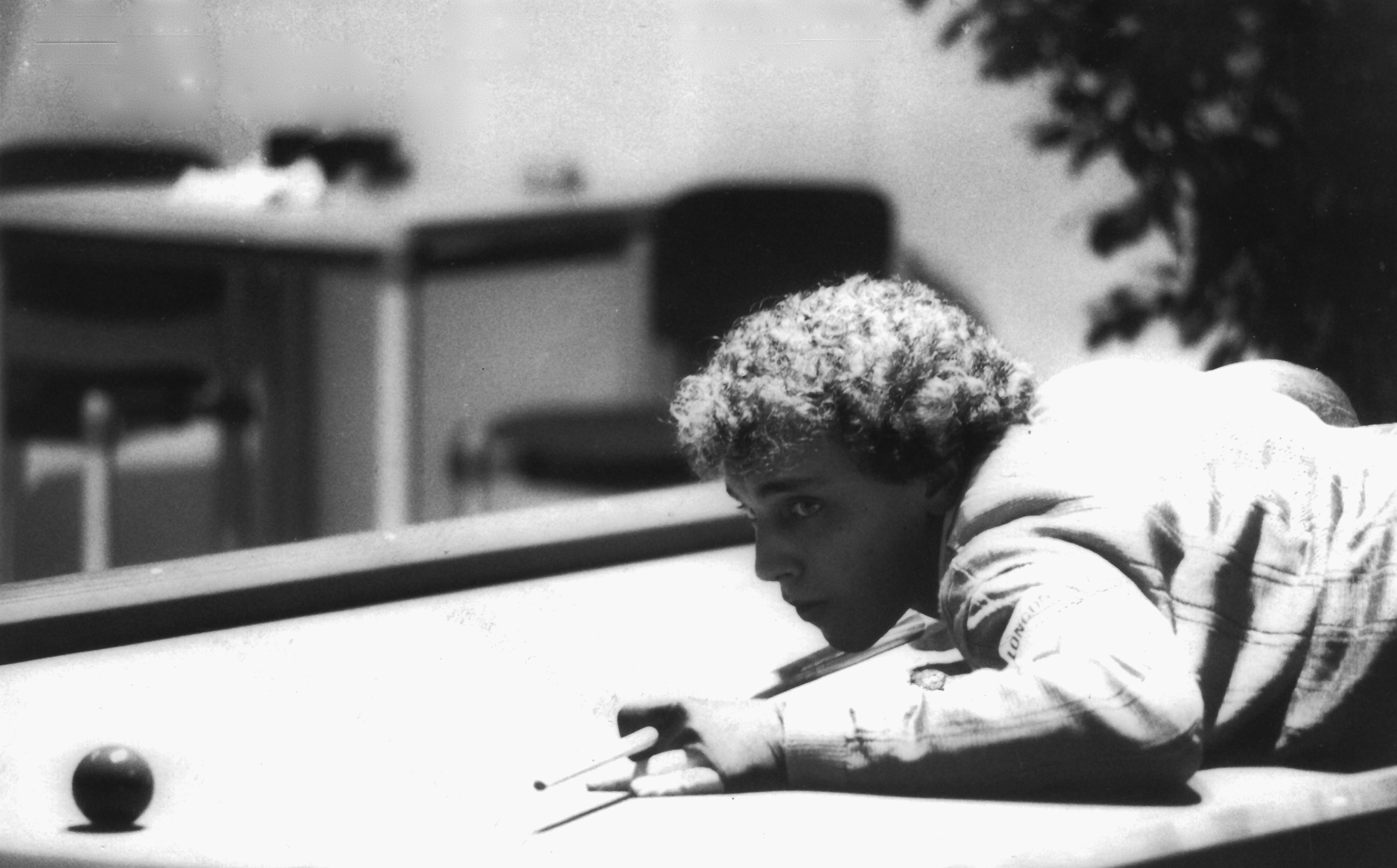
- Marco Zanetti at the 1986 Einband-Europameisterschaft

Characteristics
- Contact: No
- Team members: Individual
- Type: Cue sports
- Equipment: Cue stick, billiard balls, billiard table
- Venue: Billiard hall

Presence
- Olympic: No
- Paralympic: No

One-cushion billiards is a carom billiards discipline generally played on a cloth-covered, 10-by-5-foot (3.0 m × 1.5 m), pocketless billiard table with two cue balls and a third red-colored ball. In a one-cushion shot, the player must carom their cue ball off both the opponent's cue ball and the third object ball in either order, with at least one rail being struck before the hit on the second target ball, with one point being awarded for each successfully made. If there is ambiguity as to whether the second ball was contacted, it is resolved against the shooter. The game is won when an agreed target score is reached.

One-cushion billiards is governed by the Union Mondiale de Billard, the world governing body of carom billiards.

== History ==
One-cushion billiards developed in the late 1860s as an alternative to the game straight rail, in which points are scored by a simple carom off both object balls with no cushion requirement. Straight rail fell into disfavor as skilled top players could score a seemingly endless series of points with the balls barely moving in a confined area of the table playing area. This was a result of the "rail nurse", a shot in which the object balls are nudged at very soft speed down a rail to a duplicate position again and again. The solution was to require that all shots include contact with at least one cushion before the second object ball is contacted, an idea taken from an early form of English billiards called the doublet game. Later, between 1881 and 1889, a new nurse shot was developed for one-cushion, known as the "rub nurse". With the two object balls stacked perpendicular to a rail and just next to it, the rub nurse is performed by gently banking the cue ball off the rail so it softly grazes both object balls before coming to rest near the original position.

By the late 1870s, the newer discipline of balkline increasingly becoming effective at limited nursing. It eclipsed one-cushion billiards as the game of public match play and tournaments until well into the 20th century. One-cushion billiards retained some popularity with the public; it is known that Mark Twain enjoyed the game on occasion. The presently-dominant game, three-cushion billiards, a direct outgrowth of one-cushion billiards also beginning in the 1870s, did not marginalize balkline until the 1920s.

The U.S. title at one-cushion billiards has only been held by six men: Joseph Dion, William Sexton, Maurice Daly, George Slosson and Willie Hoppe, who held it for 11 years from 1933 to 1944. Today, one-cushion billiards is rarely played in the U.S., but it still enjoys some popularity in Europe where it is featured as one of the five games making up the annual billiards pentathlons, the other four games being 47.1 balkline, straight rail, 71.2 balkline and three-cushion billiards.
