= Kinrey Matsuyama =

Japanese billiards player (d. 1952)

Kinrey Matsuyama (松山 金嶺, Matsuyama Kinrei; died December 20, 1953) was a Japanese billiards player. A Time article from 1952 referred to Matsuyama as a Japanese Willie Hoppe. Matsuyama's last visit to the United States was in 1936. He had coached Masako Katsura. Matsuyama had had plans to move to Honolulu with his family, become an American citizen, and purchase a billiard parlor. He died on December 20, 1953, from a heart ailment. His eldest son, Hideo, 18, was attending a San Francisco high school at the time. Matsuyama was said to have taught all of Japan's top players, among whom Katsura was his star pupil.

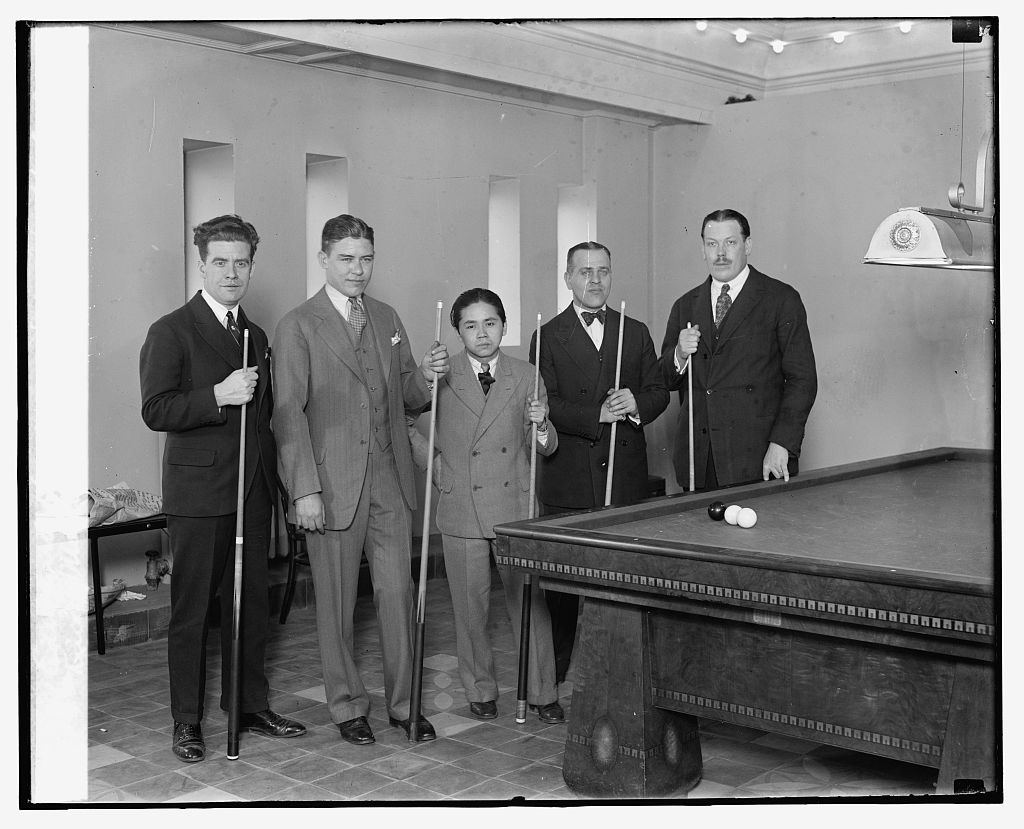
