= Maurice Daly (billiards player) =

American billiards player

Maurice Daly (1849 – July 1, 1932) was an American billiards player. The New York Times described him as a "dean of billiards in the United States".

== Biography ==
Daly was born on April 1849 in New York City. Although his father was not a billiard player, his uncle, Dudley Kavanagh, who was the first professional champion in the United States, owned a billiard room and introduced him to the game. At the age of 14, Daly started working at the billiard room, developing his skills while he played with fellow players.

At the age of 18, Daly opened a billiard room of his own at Tarrytown, New York. He began playing matches, winning the Southern championship at the age of 20 and playing his first major game in Brooklyn a year later. In 1872, when Daly was 23, he won the world four-ball championship, winning the three-ball championship in 1873.

He was also as a promoter and organizer of billiards. He was responsible for exporting the game to France and arranged the first tournament held there. He was also president of the Billiard Room Owners' Association for many years and was involved in organizing and directing nearly all of the major American tournaments for decades.

Daly died due to a complication of an illness he had contracted for fourth months, at his home in the Bronx. He was survived by two children, a daughter and a son. A Mass of Requiem occurred in the St. Augustine's Church three days later.
