= Harold Worst =

American three-cushion billiards player

Harold John Worst (1929 – June 16, 1966) was an American three-cushion billiards champion. He won the World Three-Cushion Championship four times, his first in Argentina in 1954, the youngest player to ever win the tournament, at the age of 24. Also he was equally skilled at pocket billiards and Worst dominated play to win the All-Around titles in both the 1965 Johnston City Championship and the 1965 Stardust Open championships. Two months before Worst died he competed in the 1966 World Straight Pool Championship, although severely ill he finished 4th. He was inducted into the Billiard Congress of America Hall of Fame in 1970.

He died in Blodgett Memorial Hospital in Grand Rapids, Michigan, of Lymphoma. He spent his life in Grand Rapids and he was 37 years old when he died.

== Career titles & achievements ==
- 1954 World Three-Cushion Championship
- 1957 World Three-Cushion Championship
- 1960 World Three-Cushion Championship
- 1961 World Three-Cushion Championship
- 1963 Michigan State Nine-ball Championship
- 1963 Michigan State Straight Pool Championship
- 1963 Michigan State One Pocket Championship
- 1964 Michigan State Snooker Championship
- 1965 Johnston City Nine-ball Championship
- 1965 Johnston City Straight pool Championship
- 1965 Johnston City All-Around Championship
- 1965 Stardust Open One Pocket Championship
- 1965 Stardust Open All-around Championship
- 1965 National Billiard News Achievement Award
- 1970 Billiard Congress of America Hall of Fame
