= Straight rail =

Most basic form of carom billiards

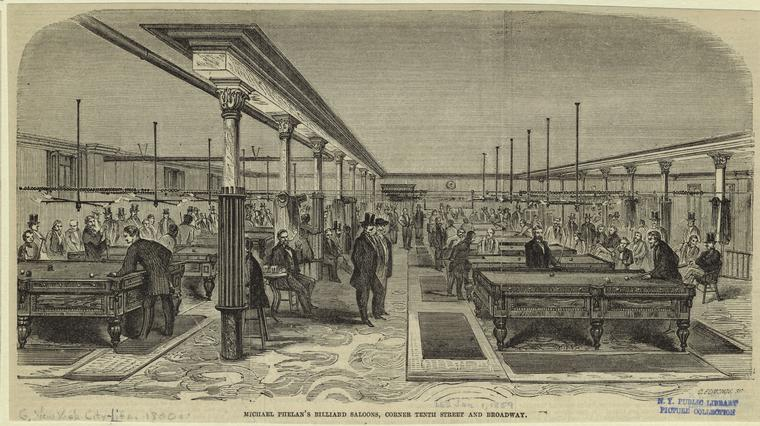
Historic print depicting Michael Phelan's Billiard Saloon located at the corner of 10th Street and Broadway in Manhattan, January 1, 1859.

Straight rail, also called straight billiards, three-ball billiards, or the free game, is a discipline of carom billiards that is the most basic form of the game. The game is played on a pocketless unmarked billiard table, usually 10 by 5 feet (3.0 m × 1.5 m) in size, and three billiard balls, one, usually white, that serves as the cue ball for the first player, a second cue ball for the second player (differentiated by a spot or by being yellow), and an object ball, usually red. The object of the game is to score points by striking the player's assigned cue ball with a cue stick so it makes contact with both the opponent's cue ball and the object ball in the same stroke, known as a carom. Games are played to a predetermined number of points.

== History ==
Straight rail, from which other carom games derive, is thought to date to the 18th century, although no exact time of origin is known. The derivation of the name straight rail is not clear, though may be a reference to the pocketless table. An early mention appears in the March 23, 1881, edition of The New York Times, wherein it is referred to as "the straight rail game." In 1855, the first public stakes straight rail match in the U.S. took place in San Francisco. The contestants, Michael Phelan and a Monsieur Damon of Paris battled for seven hours, but the high run, set by Phelan, was just nine points.

A technique soon developed, known as "crotching", referring to the space near the corner of a table where the rails meet. By moving the two object balls into the crotch, a player could endlessly score off of them, all the while keeping them immobilized in that corner. Crotching was quickly banned in 1862, and players are required to move the ball out of the corner after three points.

Skill in the professional game increased mostly through the refinement of gather shots and the development of a variety of "nurse" techniques. A gather shot is one in which brings the cue ball and object balls together, ideally near a rail. A nurse shot involves careful manipulation of object balls once gathered, which results in both balls being touched by the cue ball, but with all three balls barely moving, or that result in a position that can be duplicated over and over. The most important of these is the rail nurse which involves the progressive nudging of the object balls down a rail, keeping them close together and positioned at the end of each stroke in the same or near the same configuration such that the nurse can be replicated again and again. At the U.S. straight rail professional tournament held in 1879, Jacob Schaefer Sr. scored 690 points in a single inning at the table. With the balls barely moving and repetitively hit, there was little for the fans to watch.

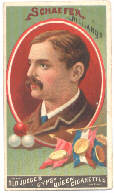
Jacob Schaefer Sr. tobacco card, circa 1880s

Although Schaefer was hailed as "the wizard", the repetitive nature of straight rail led to the development of balkline, where the table is divided by balklines into balk spaces where only a certain number of points can be scored before the balls must be driven away, and one-cushion billiards, where the cue ball must contact one of the cushions as part of the shot.

Today, straight rail play is relatively uncommon in the U.S. but retains popularity in Europe, where it is often played as a practice game for both balkline and three-cushion billiards, a development of one-cushion that has become the most prominent professional carom billiards game. Additionally, Europe hosts professional competitions known as pentathlons in which straight rail is featured as one of five carom billiards disciplines at which players compete, the other four being 47.1 balkline, one-cushion billiards, 71.2 balkline, and three-cushion billiards.
