= Carom billiards =

Billiards games played on cloth-covered pocketless tables

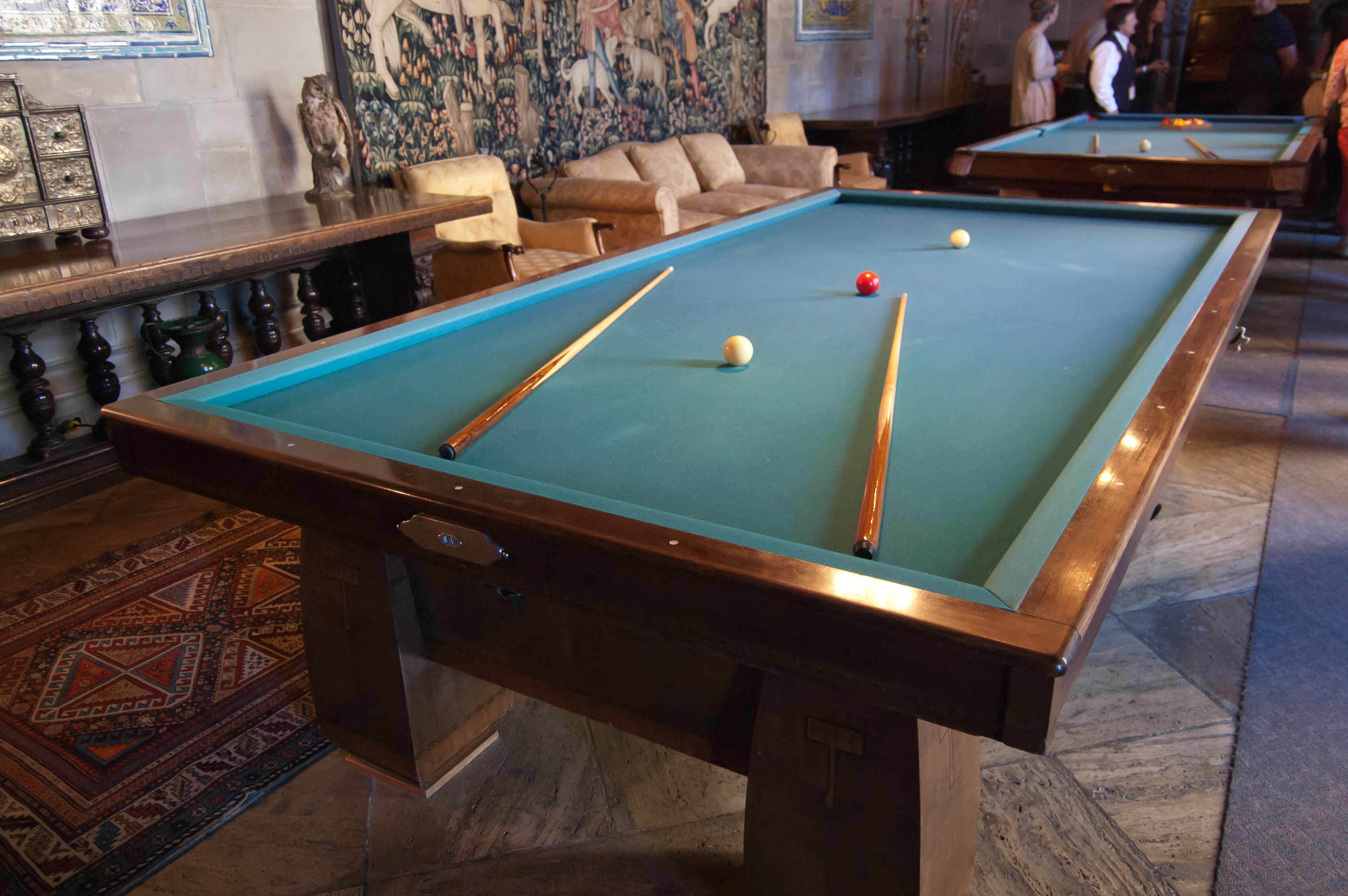
- A carom billiard table and billiard balls
- Highest governing body: Union Mondiale de Billard (UMB)
- First played: 18th-century France

Characteristics
- Contact: No
- Team members: Single opponents, doubles or teams
- Mixed-sex: Yes, sometimes in separate leagues/divisions
- Type: Indoor, table, cue sport
- Equipment: Billiard ball, billiard table, cue stick
- Venue: Billiard hall or home billiard room

Presence
- Olympic: No
- World Games: 2001 – present

Video of a game of carom billiards

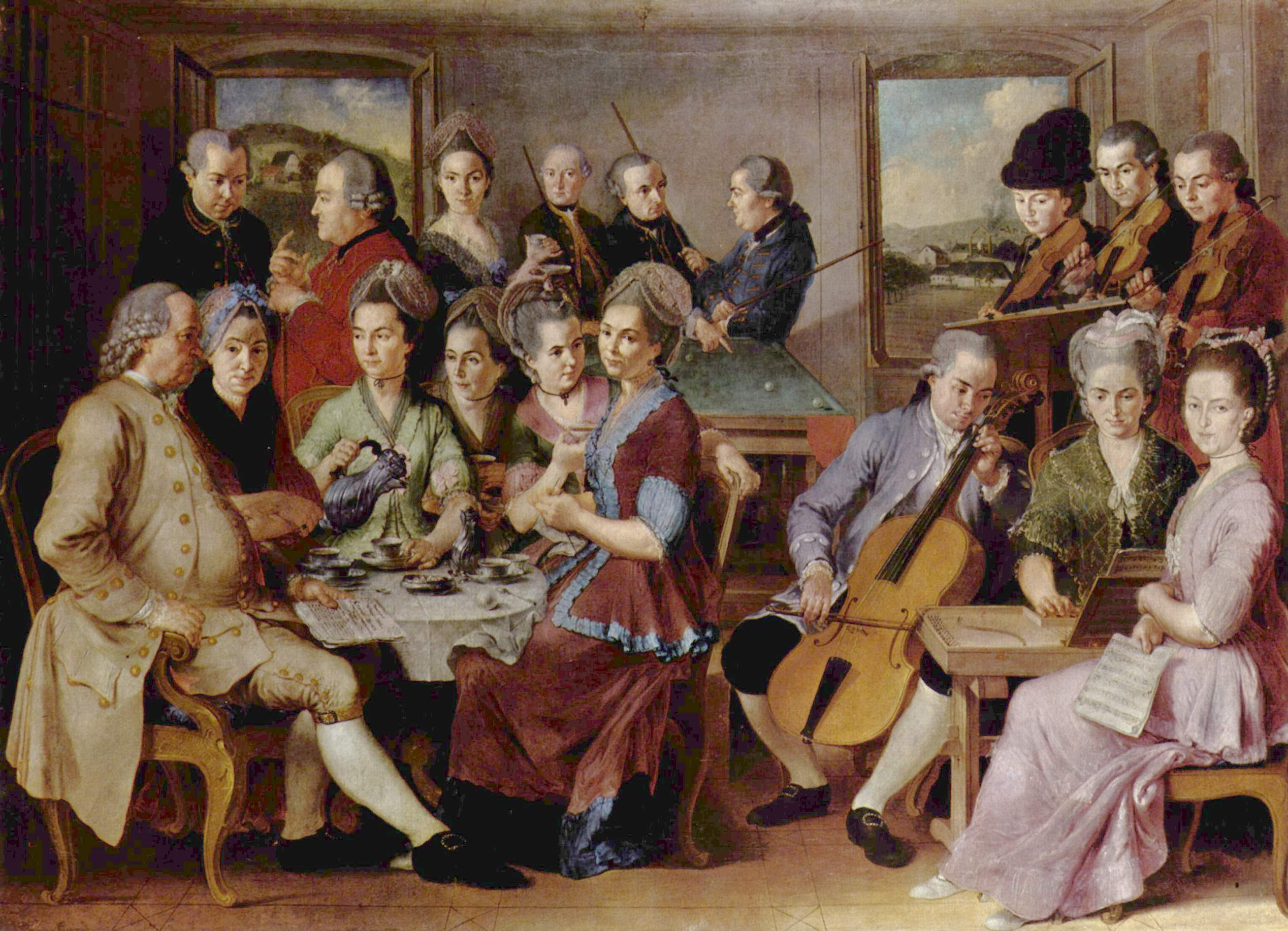
The Family Remy by Januarius Zick, c. 1776, featuring billiards among other parlour activities

Carom billiards, also called French billiards and sometimes carambole billiards, is the overarching title of a family of cue sports generally played on cloth-covered, pocketless billiard tables. In its simplest form, the object of the game is to score points or "counts" by caroming one's own cue ball off both the opponent's cue ball and the object ball on a single shot. The invention as well as the exact date of origin of carom billiards is somewhat obscure but is thought to be traceable to 18th-century France.

There is a large array of carom billiards disciplines. Some of the more prevalent today and historically are (chronologically by apparent date of development): straight rail, one-cushion, balkline, three-cushion and artistic billiards.

Carom billiards is popular in Europe, particularly France, where it originated. It is also popular in Asian countries, including Japan, the Philippines, South Korea, and Vietnam, but is now considered obscure in North America, having been supplanted by pool in popularity. The Union Mondiale de Billard (UMB) is the highest international governing body of competitive carom billiards.

== Etymology ==
The word carom, which simply means any strike and rebound, was in use in reference to billiards by at least 1779, sometimes spelled "carrom". Sources differ on the origin. It has been pegged variously as a shortening of the Spanish and Portuguese word carambola, or the French word carambole, which are used to describe the red object ball. Some etymologists have suggested that carambola, in turn, was derived from a yellow-to-orange, tropical Asian fruit also known in Portuguese as a carambola (which was a corruption of the original name of the fruit, karambal in the Marathi language of India), also known as star fruit. But this may simply be folk etymology, as the fruit bears no resemblance to a billiard ball, and there is no direct evidence for such a derivation.

In modern French, the word carambolage means 'successive collision', currently used mainly in reference to carom or cannon shots in billiards, and to multiple-vehicle car crashes.

== Equipment ==
=== Table ===
The billiard table used for carom billiards is a pocketless version and is typically 3.0 by 1.5 metres (10 ft × 5 ft).

Most cloth made for carom billiard tables is a type of baize that is made from 100% worsted wool with no nap, which provides a very fast surface allowing the balls to travel with little resistance across the table bed.

The slate bed of a carom billiard table is often heated to about 5 °C (9 °F) above room temperature, which helps to keep moisture out of the cloth to aid the balls rolling and rebounding in a consistent manner, and generally makes a table play faster. An electrically heated table is required under international tournament rules 'in order to ensure the best possible rolling', although temperatures are not specified. It is an especially important requirement for the games of three-cushion billiards and artistic billiards, and even local billiard halls often have this feature in countries where carom games are popular. Queen Victoria (1819–1901) had a billiard table that was heated using zinc tubes, although the aim at that time was chiefly to keep the then-used ivory balls from warping. The first use of electric heating was for an 18.2 balkline tournament held in December 1927 between Welker Cochran and Jacob Schaefer Jr. The New York Times announced it with fanfare: "For the first time in the history of world's championship balkline billiards a heated table will be used ..."

=== Balls ===
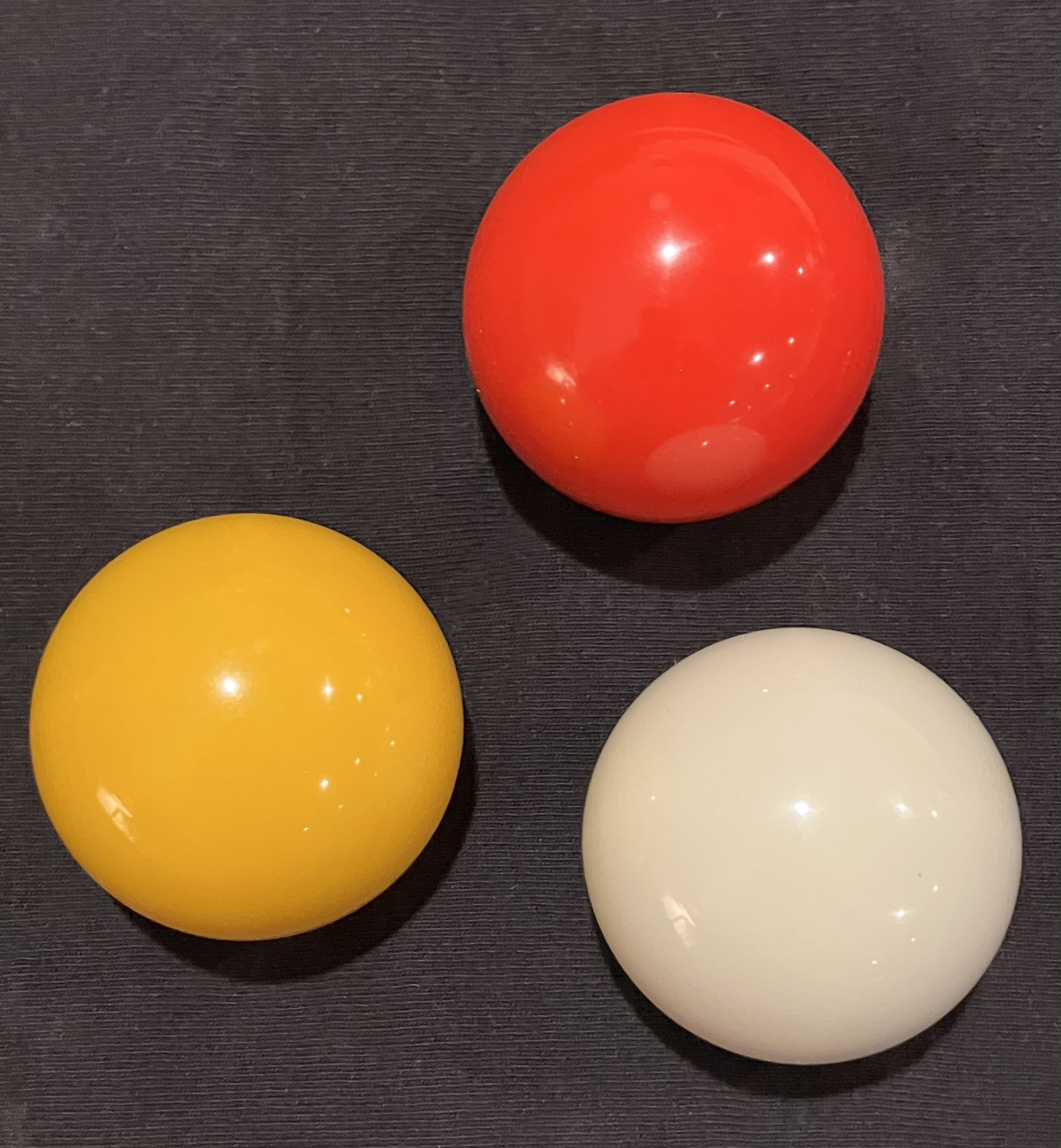
A set of modern standard carom billiard balls, comprising a red object ball, a white cue ball for the first player, and a yellow cue ball for the second player.

In most carom billiards games, the set of three standard balls includes a white cue ball for the first player, a yellow cue ball for the second player, and a third red object ball. Historically, the second cue ball was white with red or black spots to differentiate it; both types of ball sets are permitted in tournament play. The balls are significantly larger and heavier than their pool or snooker counterparts, with a diameter of 61 to 61.5 millimetres (2.40 to 2.42 in), and a weight ranging between 205 and 220 grams (7.2 and 7.8 oz) with a typical weight of 210 g (7.5 oz).

Billiard balls have been made from many different materials throughout the history of the game, including clay, wood, ivory, plastics (including early formulations of celluloid, Bakelite, and crystalate, and more modern phenolic resin, polyester, and acrylic), and even steel. The dominant material from 1627 until the early- to mid-20th century was ivory. The quest for an alternative to ivory was primarily driven by economic considerations and concerns for the safety of elephant hunters, rather than environmental or animal-welfare issues. The impetus for this search was, in part, the announcement by New York billiard table manufacturer Brunswick-Balke-Collender offering a $10,000 prize for the development of a substitute material. The initial successful alternative came in the form of celluloid, invented by John Wesley Hyatt in 1868. However, while celluloid was a viable substitute, it proved to be volatile and highly flammable, with instances of explosions occurring during its manufacturing process.

=== Cues ===
Carom billiard cues have specialized refinements making them different from cues used in other cue sports. Carom cues tend to be shorter and lighter overall, with a shorter ferrule, a thicker butt and joint, a wooden joint pin (in high-end examples), and collarless wood-to-wood joint. They have a sharply conical taper, and a smaller tip diameter as compared with pool cues. Typical carom cues are 137–142 cm (54–56 in) in length and 470–520 g (16.5–18.5 oz) in weight – lighter for straight rail, heavier for three-cushion – with a tip 11–12 mm (0.43–0.47 in) in diameter. These dimensions make the cue significantly stiffer, which aids in handling the larger and heavier balls used in carom billiards. It also acts to reduce deflection (sometimes called "squirt"), which is displacement of the cue ball's path away from the parallel line formed by the cue stick's direction of travel. It is a factor that occurs every time english is employed, and its effects are magnified by speed. In some carom games, deflection plays a large role because many shots require extremes of side-spin, coupled with great speed; this is a combination typically minimized as much as possible, by contrast, in pool.

== History of games ==
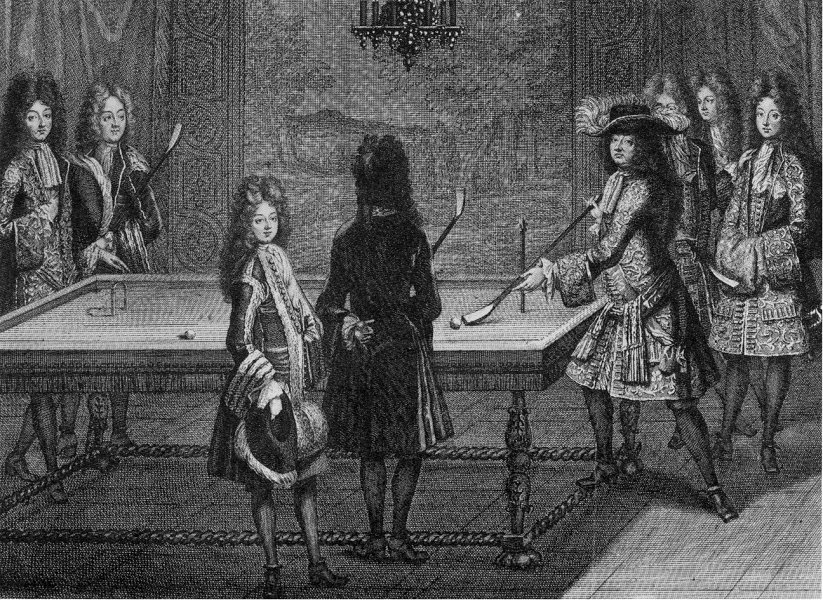
Louis XIV playing billiards (1694)

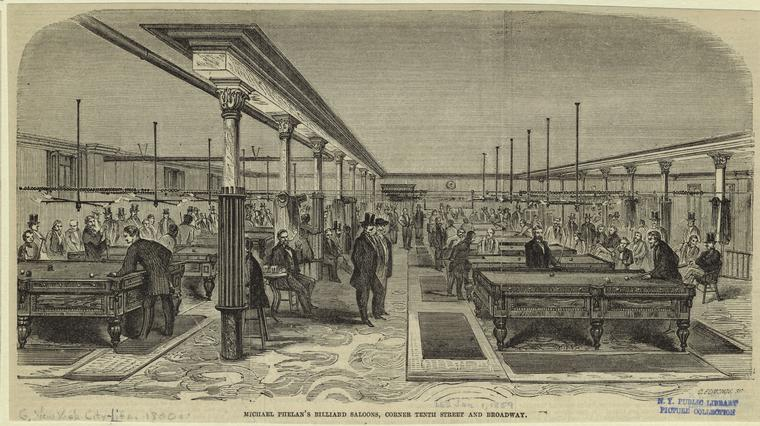
Historic print depicting Michael Phelan's Billiard Saloon located at the corner of 10th Street and Broadway in Manhattan, 1 January 1859

=== Straight rail ===
Straight rail is thought to date to the 18th century, although no exact time of origin is known. The object of straight rail is simple: one point, called a "count", is scored each time a player's cue ball makes contact with both object balls (the second cue ball and the third ball) on a single stroke. A win is achieved by reaching an agreed upon number of counts.

At straight rail's inception there was no restriction on the manner of scoring. However, the technique of crotching, or freezing two balls into the corner where the rails meet—the crotch—vastly increasing counts, resulted in an 1862 rule which allowed only three counts before at least one ball had to be driven away. Techniques continued to develop which increased counts greatly despite the crotching prohibition, especially the development of a variety of "nurse" techniques. The most important of these, the rail nurse, involves the progressive nudging of the object balls down a rail, ideally moving them only a small amount on each count, keeping them close together and positioned at the end of each stroke in the same or near the same configuration such that the nurse can be replicated again and again.

Straight rail is still popular in Europe, where it is considered a fine practice game for both balkline and three-cushion billiards. Additionally, Europe hosts professional competitions known as pentathlons in which straight rail is featured as one of five billiards disciplines at which players compete, the other four being 47.1 balkline, cushion caroms, 71.2 balkline, and three-cushion billiards.

Straight rail was played professionally in the United States from 1873 to 1879, but is uncommon there today.

=== Balkline ===
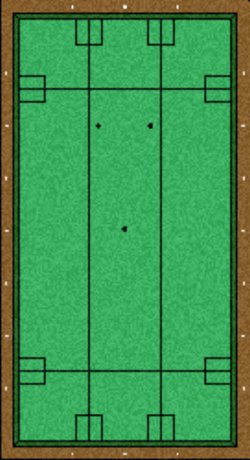
Balkline table with standard markings

In 1879, a variant called the "champion's game" or "limited-rail" was introduced with the specific intent of frustrating the rail nurse. The game employed diagonal lines at the table's corners to regions where counts were restricted. Ultimately, however, despite its divergence from straight rail, the champion's game simply expanded the dimensions of the balk space defined under the existing crotch prohibition which was not sufficient to stop nursing.

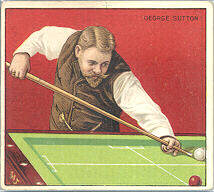
Cigarette card, c. 1911, showing George Sutton playing balkline

Balkline succeeded the champion's game, adding more rules to curb nursing techniques. In the balkline games, the entire table is divided into rectangular balk spaces by drawing pairs of balklines lengthwise and widthwise across the table parallel from each rail. This divides the table into nine rectangular balk spaces. Such balk spaces define areas of the table surface in which a player may only score up to a threshold number of points while the object balls are within that region. Additionally, rectangles are drawn where each balkline meets a rail, called anchor spaces, which developed to stop a number of nursing techniques that exploited the fact that if the object balls straddled a balkline, no count limit was in place.

A balkline game is defined by two measures: the distance of the balklines from the rails and the number of points that are allowed in each balk space before at least one ball must leave the region. This is reflected in the numeric name of the game; the first number indicates the balk distance in either inches or centimeters, and the second, after a dot or a slash, indicates the count restriction in balk spaces, which is always either one or two. For example, in 18.2 balkline, one of the more prominent balkline games and of US origin, the name indicates that balklines are drawn 18 inches (46 centimetres) distant from each rail, and only two counts are allowed in a balk space before a ball must leave. By contrast, in 71.2 balkline, of French invention, lines are drawn 71 centimetres (28 inches) distant from each rail, also with a two-count restriction for balk spaces.

In its various incarnations, balkline was the predominant carom discipline from 1883 to the 1930s, when it was overtaken by three-cushion billiards. Balkline is still popular in Europe and the Far East.

=== One-cushion ===
One-cushion carom, or simply cushion carom, also arose in the late 1860s as another alternative to the repetitive play of straight rail, inspired by an early variant of English billiards. The object of the game is to score cushion caroms, meaning a carom off of both object balls with at least one rail cushion being struck before the hit on the second object ball. One-cushion carom is still popular in Europe.

=== Three-cushion ===
In three-cushion carom, the object is to carom off both object balls with at least three rail cushions being contacted before the contact of the cue ball with the second object ball.

Three-cushion is a very difficult game. Averaging one point per inning is professional-level play, and averaging 1.5 to 2 is world-class play.

Wayman C. McCreery of St. Louis, Missouri, is credited with popularizing the game in the 1870s. At least one publication categorically states he invented the game as well. The first three-cushion billiards tournament took place 14–31 January 1878, in St. Louis, with McCreery a participant and Leon Magnus the winner. The high run for the tournament was just 6 points, and the high average a 0.75. The game was infrequently played, with many top carom players of the era voicing their dislike of it, until the 1907 introduction of the Lambert Trophy. By 1924, three-cushion had become so popular that two giants in other billiard disciplines agreed to take up the game especially for a challenge match. On 22 September 1924, Willie Hoppe, the world's balkline champion (who later took up three-cushion with a passion), and Ralph Greenleaf, the world's straight pool title holder, played a well advertised, multi-day, match to 600 points. Hoppe was the eventual winner with a final score in of 600–527.

Three-cushion billiards retains great popularity in parts of Europe, Asia, and Latin America, and is the most popular carom billiards game played in the US today. UMB, as the governing body of the sport, had been staging world three-cushion championships since the late 1920s.

=== Artistic billiards ===
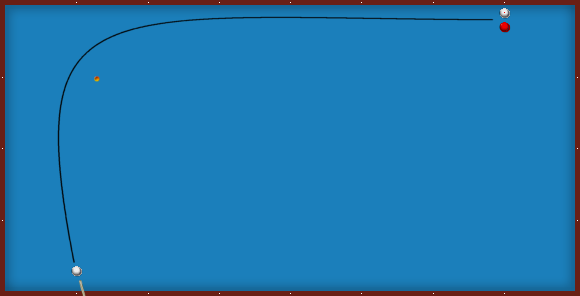
A massé shot around a pin

In artistic billiards players compete at performing 76 preset shots of varying difficulty. Each set shot has a maximum point value assigned for perfect execution, ranging from a 4-point minimum for lowest level difficulty shots, and climbing to an 11-point maximum for shots deemed highest in difficulty level. There is a total of 500 points available to a player.

Each shot in an artistic billiards match is played from a well-defined position (in some venues within an exacting two millimeter tolerance), and each shot must unfold in an established manner. Players are allowed three attempts at each shot. In general, the shots making up the game, even 4-point shots, require a high degree of skill, devoted practice and specialized knowledge to perform.

World title competition first started in 1986 and required the use of ivory balls. However, this requirement was dropped in 1990. The highest score ever achieved in competition overall is 427 set by Walter Bax on 12 March 2006, at a competition held in Deurne, Belgium, beating his own previous record of 425. The game is played predominantly in western Europe, especially in France, Belgium and the Netherlands.

== Competition disciplines ==
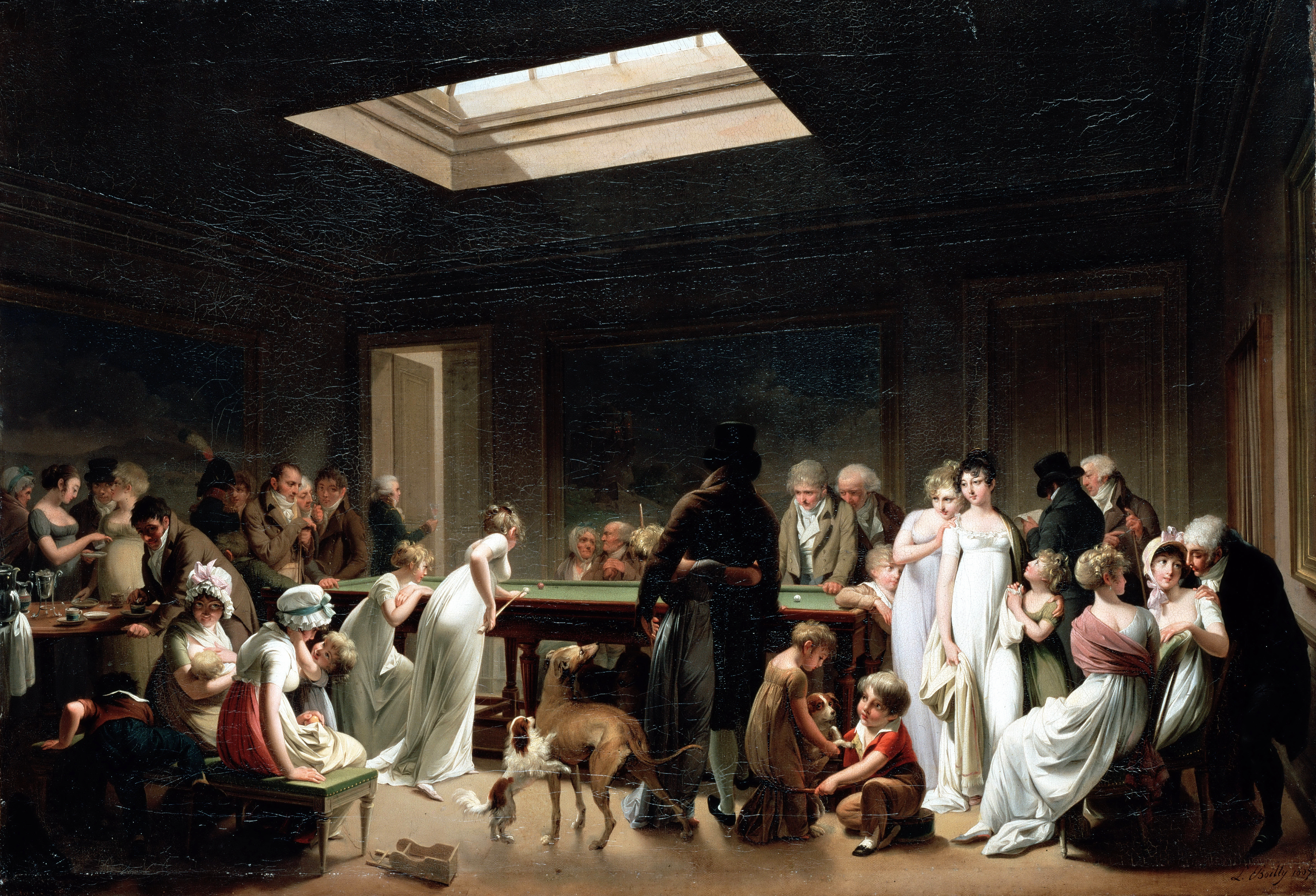
A Game of Billiards by Louis-Léopold Boilly, 1807

Paul Gauguin's 1888 painting Night Café at Arles includes a depiction of Carol billiards

- Triathlon: Straight rail, balkline and one-cushion; or balkline, one-cushion, and three-cushion; the latter format is used in the ANAG Billiard Cup
- Pentathlon: Straight rail, balkline (47.2 and 71.2), one-cushion, and three-cushion.
