= Willie Hoppe =

American professional carom billiards champion (1887 – 1959)

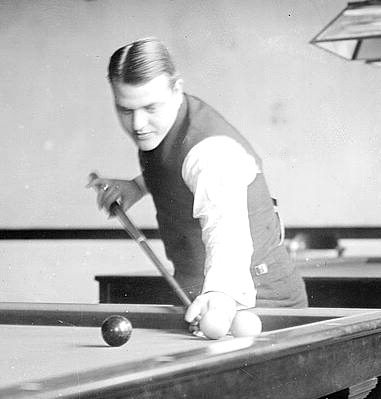
Hoppe, ca. 1910–1915

William Frederick Hoppe (October 11, 1887 – February 1, 1959) (surname rhymes with "poppy"), was an internationally renowned American professional carom billiards champion. Hoppe is widely considered one of the greatest billiards players of all time and was posthumously inducted into the Billiard Congress of America Hall of Fame in 1966.

== Biography ==
Hoppe was born on October 11, 1887, in Cornwall-on-Hudson, New York. He won 51 world titles between 1906 and 1952, in three forms of carom billiards: three-cushion, (four sub-disciplines of) balkline and one-cushion caroms. He died on February 1, 1959, in Miami, Florida.

== Professional career ==
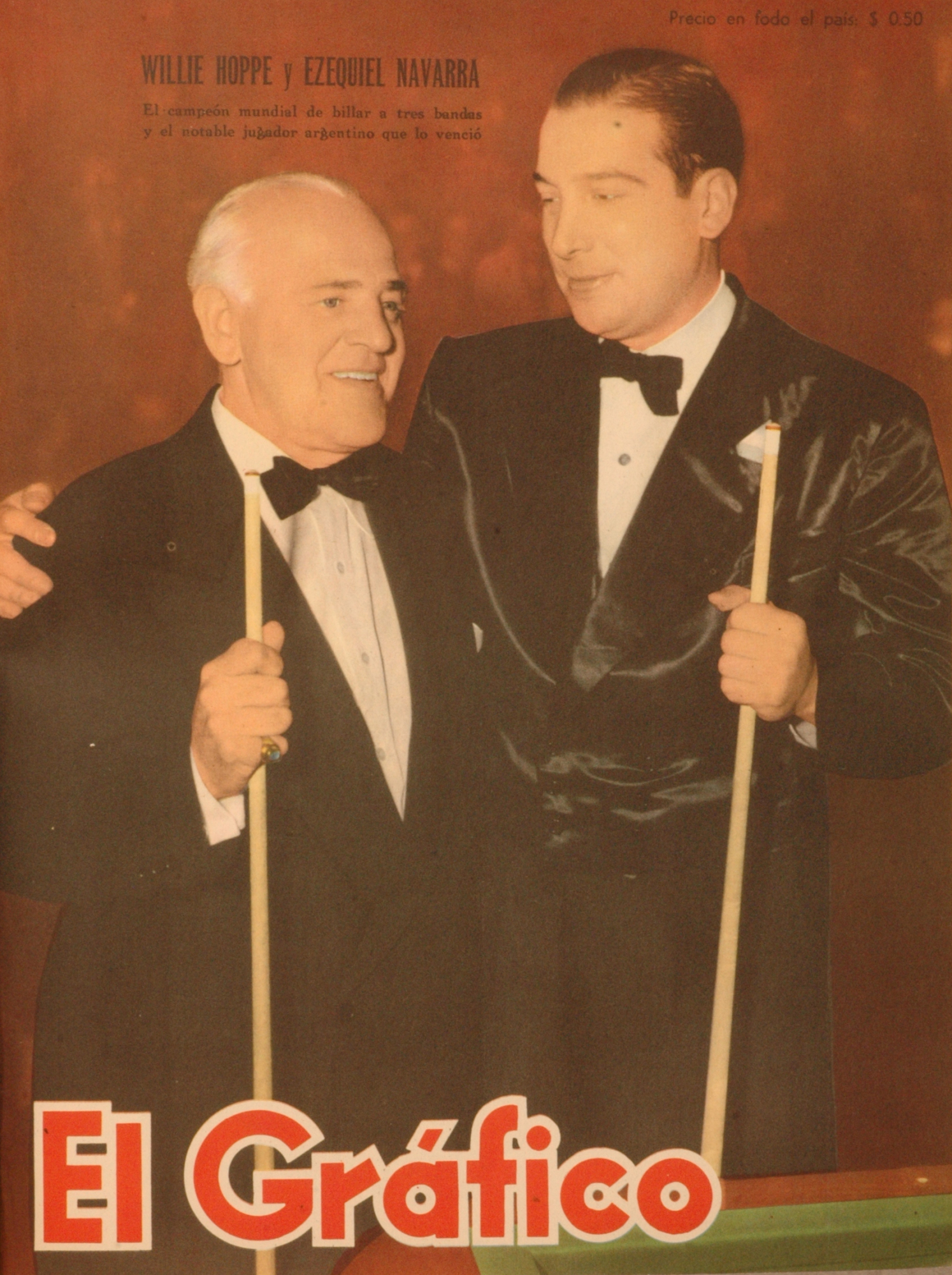
Hoppe on the cover of the magazine El Gráfico in 1949, with Ezequiel Navarra, an Argentine player who had just defeated him.

Hoppe won 51 world titles between 1906 and 1952. He was also known for various long-standing high runs, including scoring 2,000 contiguous points in straight rail, 622 points in 18.2 balkline, and a run of 25 points in three-cushion. He once made a tournament average of 1.333, a world record at that time.

Hoppe published his first book, Thirty Years of Billiards, in 1925, and followed this up many years later with the introductory work, Billiards As It Should Be Played, in 1941. Hoppe's peculiar style of stroke was a result of his career as a child prodigy. He barely reached the table and had to stand on a box. In Billiards As It Should Be Played Hoppe emphatically advised players not to use his way of directing the cue.

After winning the world title in 1952, Hoppe retired from title play and became a goodwill ambassador for the sport by conducting a series of exhibition matches. Hoppe may have been the only billiards player to ever put on an exhibition in the White House. He performed before President William Taft in 1911.

He was ranked number 1 on the Billiards Digest 50 Greatest Players of the Century.

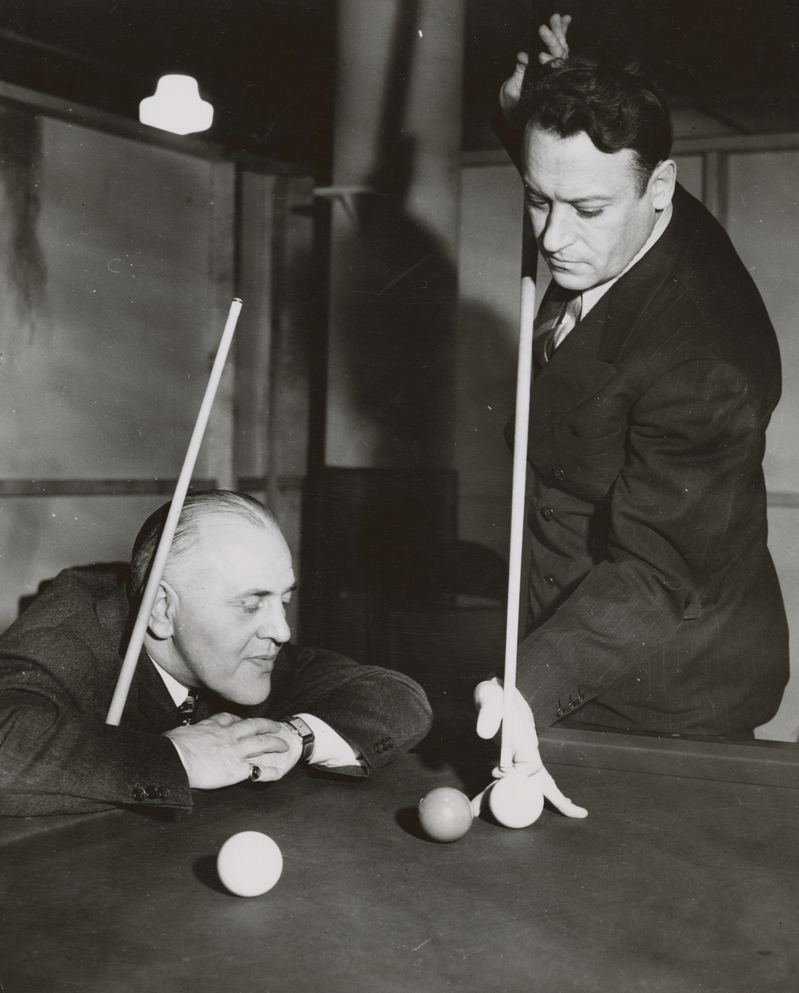
Willie "William Frederick" Hoppe, c. 1941

== Titles and tournament wins ==
- World 18.1 Balkline Championship (1906, 1908-1911, 1914-1927)
- World 18.2 Balkline Championship (1907, 1910-1920, 1923, 1924, 1927)
- World Three-Cushion Championship (1936, 1940-1944, 1946-1952)
