= Balkline =

Discipline of carom billiards

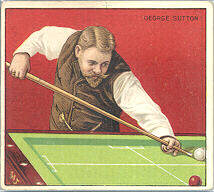
Cigarette card, c. 1911, showing George Butler Sutton playing balkline

A typical modern balkline table configuration showing lines and anchor spaces. The center box is an artifact of balkline placement, and is never subject to balk space restrictions.

Balkline is a discipline of carom billiards generally played with two cue balls and a red object ball on a cloth-covered, 5 foot × 10 foot, pocketless billiard table. The object of the game is to score points, also called counts, by a player striking their cue ball so it makes contact with both the opponent's cue ball and the object ball on a single stroke. The table is divided by lines drawn on the surface, called balklines, into marked regions called balk spaces, which define areas of the table surface in which a player may only score up to a maximum number of points while the opponent's cue ball and the object ball are within that region. A player wins the game by reaching a predetermined number of points.

The balkline games were developed to be more difficult to play and less tedious for spectators than the precursor game, straight rail. The top players of straight rail became so skillful that they would score a seemingly endless series of points, with the balls barely moving in a confined area of the table. According to Mike Shamos, curator of the U.S. Billiard Archive, "the skill of dedicated players [of straight rail] was so great that they could essentially score at will." The development of balkline is characterized by a series of back and forth developments, where new rules would be implemented to make the game more difficult and to decrease high runs to keep spectators interested, countered by skill development to account for each new rule.

== History ==
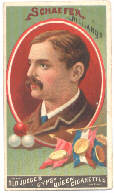
Jacob Schaefer Sr. tobacco card, circa 1880s

Straight rail, from which balkline derives, is thought to date to the 18th century, although no exact time of origin is known. In straight rail, there was originally no restriction on the manner of scoring.

A technique soon developed, known as "crotching", referring to the space near the corner of a table where the rails meet. By moving the two object balls into the crotch, a player could endlessly score off of them, all the while keeping them immobilized in that corner. Crotching was quickly banned in 1862, and players are required to move the ball out of the corner after three points.

Skill in the professional game increased mostly through the refinement of gather shots and the development of a variety of "nurse" techniques. A gather shot is one that brings the cue ball and object balls together, ideally near a rail. A nurse shot involves careful manipulation of object balls once gathered, which results in both balls being touched by the cue ball, but with all three balls barely moving, or that result in a position that can be duplicated over and over. The most important of these is the rail nurse which involves the progressive nudging of the object balls down a rail, keeping them close together and positioned at the end of each stroke in the same or near the same configuration such that the nurse can be replicated again and again. At the U.S. straight rail professional tournament held in 1879, Jacob Schaefer Sr. scored 690 points in a single inning at the table. With the balls barely moving and repetitively hit, there was little for the fans to watch.

Shortly after, with the specific intent of frustrating nurse shots along the rail, officials employed diagonal lines at the table's corners to regions where counts were restricted, an expansion of the crotching rule that came to be known as the "champion's game".

A diagram showing the diagonal balklines used in the forerunner "champion's game".

Reporting on the first tournament at which the rules were featured in 1879, The New York Times wrote: "taken as a test, the games thus far played indicate that the new game has taken well with the public, for whose amusement it was chiefly designed. That the rules binding it have effected a great improvement on the ordinary game of French caroms there can be no doubt." Ultimately, despite its divergence from straight rail, the champion's game simply expanded the dimensions of the balk space defined under the existing crotch prohibition which was not sufficient to stop nursing.

As a response, rather than drawing balklines diagonally in just the corners, the entire table was divided into rectangular balk spaces, by drawing balklines lengthwise and widthwise across the length of the table a set distance parallel out from each rail. The use of such balklines was first proposed in 1875 but was rejected. However, because high runs once again increased as skill compensated for the new conditions, in 1883 the balklines were accepted, replacing the champion's game in tournament play. A variety of distances and count restrictions have been used.

Balklines did not end the use of the rail nurse but they did restrict its use. Soon a new type of nurse was developed which exploited a loophole in balkline rules: so long as both object balls were on either side of a balkline, there was no restriction on counts, as each ball lay in a separate balk space, a technique called the anchor nurse.

On 1894, Chicago billiard hall owner J. E. Parker, after Schaefer and Frank C. Ives both posted extensive runs at his hall using the anchor nurse, suggested adding a rectangular marking straddling the spot where the balkline meets each rail, known as the anchor space and nicknamed the "Parker's box". Enclosing a space 3.5 inches (8.9 cm) out from the rail and 7 inches (18 cm) across, the box marks a region where both balls are considered in balk, even if the object balls physically fall on either side of a balkline. When first instituted, ten shots were allowed while the balls were inside the anchor space. This was reduced to five in 1896.

True to form, the next skill development response was the chuck nurse, known as a rocking cannon in the United Kingdom. With one ball frozen to the cushion in the anchor space, but the second object ball away from the rail just outside the borders of the anchor space, the cue ball is gently rebounded off the frozen ball not moving it, but with just enough speed to meet the other object ball which rocks in place, but does not change position. In 1912, William A. Spinks ran 1,010 continuous points using the chuck nurse and broke off his run without ever missing.

There were a number of proposals to curtail the chuck nurse's effectiveness, including removing the four balk spaces on the end rails but leaving balk spaces in place on the long rails, but the solution ultimately reached, and the change that brought the general rules of balkline into configuration with what is played today, was simply a doubling of the anchor space to 7 by 14 inches (18 cm × 36 cm), placing the chuck nurse out of reach. The new restriction was instituted for a 1914 tournament.

In its various incarnations, balkline was the predominant billiards discipline from 1883 to the 1930s when it was overtaken by three cushion billiards and pool. Balkline is not very common in the U.S. but still enjoys a large popularity in Europe and the Far East.

== Modern forms ==
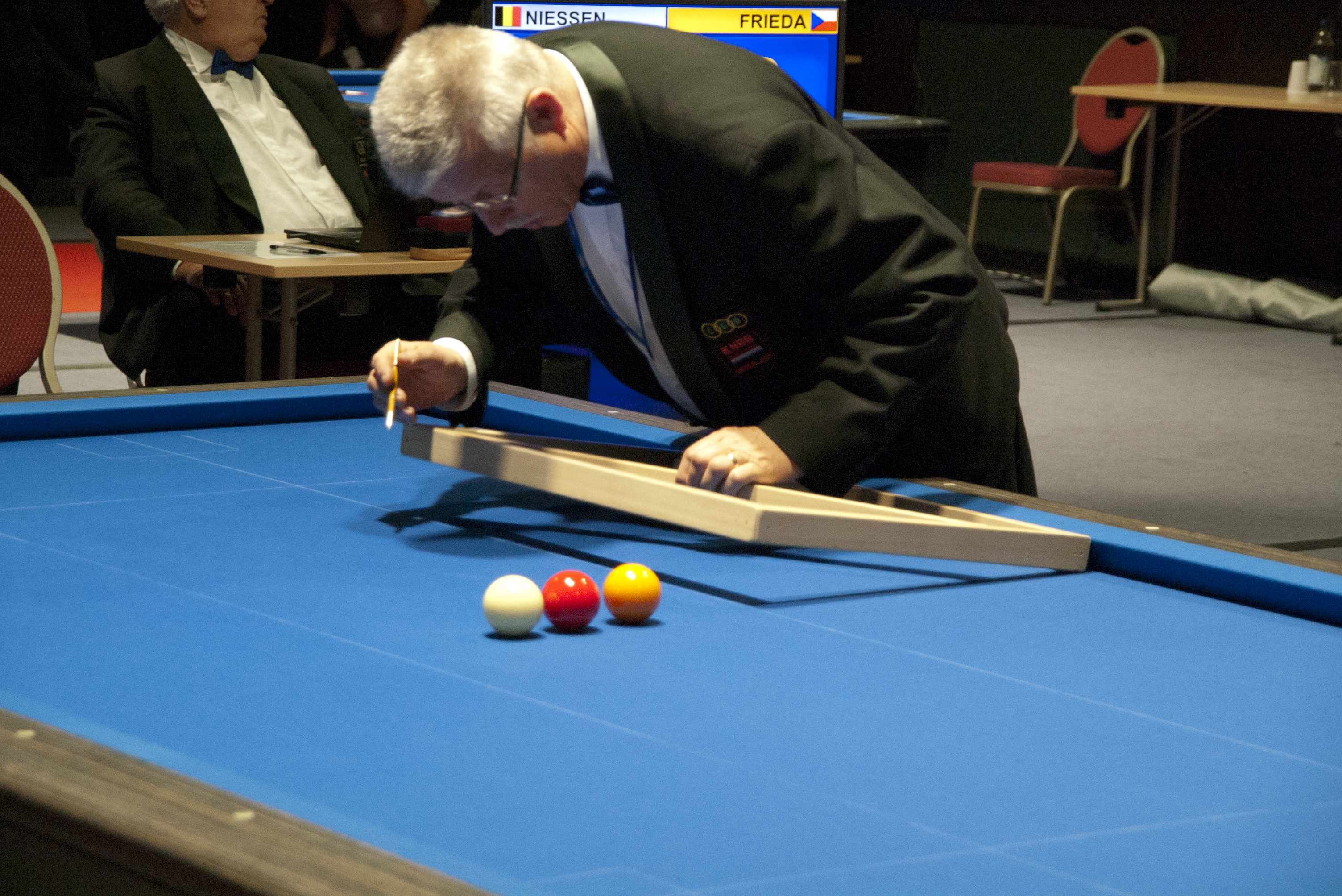
Referee marking balklines at the European Carom Billiards Championships 2015.

For the most part, the differences between one balkline game to another is defined by two measures: the distance of the balklines from the cushions, and the number of points that are allowed in each balk space before at least one ball must leave the region. Generally, balkline games are given numerical names indicating both of these characteristics; the first number indicates the distance in either inches or centimeters and the second, after a dot, indicates the count restriction in balk spaces, which is usually either one or two. For example, the name of 18.2 balkline, one of the more prominent balkline games of U.S. origin, indicates that balklines are drawn 18 inches (46 cm) from each rail, and only two counts are allowed in a balk space before a ball must leave. By contrast, in 71.2 balkline, of French origin, lines are drawn 71 centimetres (28 in) from each rail, also with a two count restriction for balk spaces.
