= 1997 Mosconi Cup =

- Dates: 18–21 December
- Venue: York Hall
- Location: Bethnal Green, London, England
- 8 – 13 United States wins the Mosconi Cup

The 1997 Virtual Pool 2 Mosconi Cup, the fourth edition of the annual nine-ball pool competition between teams representing Europe and the United States, took place 18–21 December 1997 at the York Hall in Bethnal Green, London, England.

Team USA won the Mosconi Cup by defeating Team Europe 13–8.

== Teams ==
Team USA
Name	State of birth	Notes
Earl Strickland	North Carolina
Kim Davenport	Oklahoma
Johnny Archer	Georgia
Jim Rempe	Pennsylvania
Nick Varner	Kentucky
Reed Pierce	Mississippi

Team Europe
Name	Nationality	Notes
Steve Davis	United Kingdom
Ralf Souquet	Germany
Oliver Ortmann	Germany
Mika Immonen	Finland
Ronnie O'Sullivan	United Kingdom
Tommy Donlon	Ireland

== Results ==
=== Thursday, 18 December ===
==== Session 1 ====
	Results
Doubles; Mika Immonen; Tommy Donlon	2–1 (4–5, 3–1, 3–1)	Doubles; Johnny Archer; Kim Davenport
Doubles; Ralf Souquet; Ronnie O'Sullivan	2–1 (1–3, 3–1, 3–1)	Doubles; Nick Varner; Reed Pierce
Doubles; Oliver Ortmann; Steve Davis	1–2 (2–4, 3–0, 0–3)	Doubles; Earl Strickland; Jim Rempe
2	Session	1
2	Overall	1

=== Friday, 19 December ===
==== Session 2 ====
	Results
Doubles; Mika Immonen; Tommy Donlon	2–1 (3–0, 3–5, 5–4)	Doubles; Johnny Archer; Kim Davenport
Doubles; Steve Davis; Ronnie O'Sullivan	1–2 (4–5, 3–1, 0–3)	Doubles; Earl Strickland; Jim Rempe
Doubles; Oliver Ortmann; Ralf Souquet	2–1 (3–1, 4–5, 3–1)	Doubles; Nick Varner; Reed Pierce
2	Session	1
4	Overall	2

==== Session 3 ====
	Results
Singles; Mika Immonen	1–2 (4–2, 0–3, 3–5)	Singles; Johnny Archer
Singles; Oliver Ortmann	2–1 (2–4, 3–0, 3–0)	Singles; Jim Rempe
1	Session	1
5	Overall	3

=== Saturday, 20 December ===
==== Session 4 ====
	Results
Singles; Ralf Souquet	1–2 (1–3, 3–0, 1–3)	Singles; Earl Strickland
Doubles; Tommy Donlon; Oliver Ortmann	1–2 (2–3, 3–1, 1–3)	Doubles; Earl Strickland; Jim Rempe
Doubles; Steve Davis; Ronnie O'Sullivan	2–0 (3–1, 3–1)	Doubles; Johnny Archer; Reed Pierce
Doubles; Ralf Souquet; Mika Immonen	2–1 (3–2, 1–3, 3–1)	Doubles; Kim Davenport; Nick Varner
2	Session	2
7	Overall	5

==== Session 5 ====
	Results
Singles; Ronnie O'Sullivan	0–2 (2–3, 2–3)	Singles; Nick Varner
Singles; Tommy Donlon	1–2 (3–2, 1–3, 2–4)	Singles; Reed Pierce
Singles; Steve Davis	2–0 (3–1, 3–1)	Singles; Kim Davenport
Singles; Mika Immonen	1–2 (3–0, 0–3, 1–3)	Singles; Johnny Archer
1	Session	3
8	Overall	8

=== Sunday, 21 December ===
==== Session 6 ====
	Results
Singles; Oliver Ortmann	0–2 (0–3, 1–3)	Singles; Jim Rempe
Singles; Ralf Souquet	0–2 (0–3, 1–3)	Singles; Earl Strickland
Singles; Ronnie O'Sullivan	0–2 (2–3, 1–3)	Singles; Nick Varner
0	Session	3
8	Overall	11

==== Session 7 ====
	Results
Singles; Steve Davis	1–2 (3–0, 0–3, 3–5)	Singles; Kim Davenport
Singles; Tommy Donlon	0–2 (0–3, 0–3)	Singles; Reed Pierce
0	Session	2
8	Overall	13
