= Golden Cue =

Billiard hall in Albany, New York

Coordinates: 42.685915°N 73.797191°W

The Golden Cue Billiard Lounge (also known as Golden Cue Billiards and Sports Pub) is the only extant billiard hall in Albany, New York, the state capital, and one of the oldest poolrooms in the Northeast. Bordering on Colonie in the state's Capital District, it was opened in 1963, "riding the wave" of the popularity of The Hustler (1961), and bought in 1973 by Rocco Spinelli, Sr., whose son Rocco, Jr. owns it today. The venue has hosted Joss Tour events for many years.

This pool hall in Albany, New York, should not be confused with similarly named businesses in other places, nor the similarly named gaming option in Sega's World Snooker Championship 2007 video game.

== Description ==
The formerly alcohol-free, 26-table venue, described as "retro", "classic" and "unadorned", was intentionally designed to be open and bright, to avoid the stereotypical dingy pool hall atmosphere. It has a beer and wine bar and food service as of 2010. The hall is equipped for pool (pocket billiards) games such as eight-ball, nine-ball and straight pool, with 19 classic 1960s Brunswick Gold Crown II tables among others, as well as for carom billiards games such as three-cushion. The hall hosts American Poolplayers Association member league play. The business has also long provided table soccer tables.

== Major events ==
The billiard lounge was long the "home" hall of pro, road player and WPA World Nine-ball Championship contender Mike Zuglan (today a pool hall operator himself, owning Pro Billiard Lounge in nearby Schenectady). When he was only 10 years old, Zuglan was said to have held his own in an exhibition match against famed hustler and showman Rudolf "Minnesota Fats" Wanderone, who played a nine-ball exhibition on Golden Cue's table number 23 (described as "something of a shrine" today).

The hall is the host of the annual pro-am Joss Tour Northeast 9-Ball Open, (an event founded by Zuglan and originally hosted at his own hall). April 18–19, 2010, Dennis "the Hatchet Man" Hatch went undefeated against a field of 43 competitors, and was victorious, 9–4, over Matt Tetreault (while Hal Hughes won 3–2 over John Rich in the amateurs-only second-day tournament). The hall has been a location for Joss Tour events for many years, and is a sponsor of the tour (providing, for example, US$2,000 in added prize money for the 2010 event). Hatch has dominated the Golden Cue competition for several years running. In 2009, he won the event against 46 entrants, taking the final with a narrow 9–8, again versus Tetreault. November 15–16, 2008, the Golden Cue hosted the finals of that year's Joss Tour. Hatch was again the victor, 9–4 vs. Jeremy Sossei in a field of 53. April 19–20 of that year, in a regular Joss Tour stop at Golden Cue, Hatch won yet again, in a field of 49, beating Dan Heidrich in the final after defeating local hero Zuglan. April 14–15, 2007, Zuglan took the prize, with Dan Hewitt as runner-up (Hatch was tied for 7th/8th). The Color of Money supporting actor and real-life top road player Keith McCready took the Golden Cue Joss title, versus Hewitt in the 9–5 final, on April 16–17, 2005, defending his prior victory in the 2004 edition of the event.

The Golden Cue also hosted tour stop #13 of the Northeast Amateur 10-Ball Tour (sponsored by Dominiak Cues and InsidePool magazine), on March 14, 2010. The event culminated in a victory for Paul Rozonewski over Albany local Tom Acciavatti in the final.
