= Ronnie Allen (pool player) =

Former American professional pool player

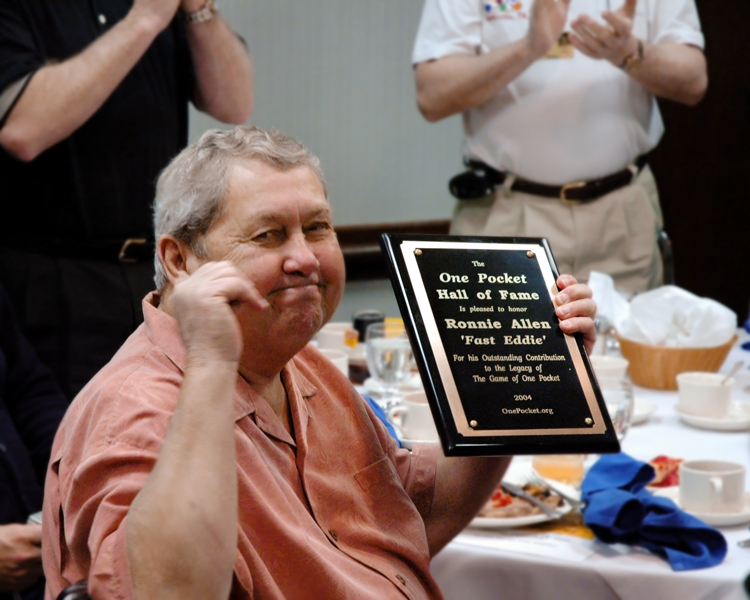
- Allen at the One Pocket Hall of Fame banquet ceremony for his outstanding contributions to the legacy of One Pocket

Personal information
- Nickname: "Fast Eddie"
- Born: July 12, 1938 Danville, Illinois, U.S.
- Died: February 6, 2013 (aged 74)

Sport
- Sport: Billiards
- Event: One Pocket Hall of Fame
- Updated on 16 April 2013

Ronnie Monroe "Fast Eddie" Allen (July 12, 1938 – February 6, 2013) was an American professional pool player. He was labeled as a pool "super star" in the prime of his pool-shooting career by his peers during pool's golden era.

For several decades from the early 60s to the late 80s, Allen was considered one of the best One Pocket players in the world. He was inducted into the One Pocket Hall of Fame in 2004 for his contributions to the pocket billiard game of one pocket.

Some believe that Walter Tevis, who wrote the book The Hustler that later became an Academy Award-winning film, based the character of "Fast Eddie" on Ronnie Allen after seeing him compete. Minnesota Fats said of Ronnie Allen, "Anybody who plays him for money ain't got no chance at all."

== Early days ==
Born in Danville, Illinois, Ronnie Allen was there only a week, when his family had to move. His father was part-owner of a carnival, and the entire family, who worked at the carnival, moved every week to a new town.

When Ronnie was 11 years old, his father was killed in a motor vehicle accident, leaving his mother to raise his brother, sister, and himself. She bought a restaurant in Oklahoma City on the corner of 40th and May Avenue. Living the carnival lifestyle for much of his youth, Ronnie had never been in one place for more than a week, and now he had a permanent home and stayed in the same school all year, developing steady friendships.

A friend of the family owned a pool room in Oklahoma City that Ronnie passed by each day on his way to his mom's restaurant, where the entire family worked. When he was 14 years old, he had developed his game playing at this room on a daily basis.

The first pool tournament he ever entered in 1961 was held at Cochran's, a popular pool room that stayed open all night long in San Francisco, California, and he won it. In an interview on onepocket.org, Allen was asked to describe himself, to which he replied, "I've led two kinds of life. I've raised three children, led a Christian life. But when I was on the road, I was a predator and a hustler."

Allen was 20 years old when he met and married Faye in San Francisco, after a very short courtship. Pool was going through a slump at the time, especially in the Bay Area, so they decided to move to Southern California. Faye's family was from Minnesota. They settled in Burbank. Faye and Ronnie had three children, two girls and a boy: Tracy the oldest, Ronnie Jr., and Reina. Those who knew Ronnie from the pool rooms would get a different view if they saw him at home with his family at this time. He adored his family and enjoyed being a father.

== Professional career ==
The Power One Pocket strategy was credited to Ronnie Allen, as he could move several balls away from his opponent's pocket and towards his own, which is a valuable skill when playing the pocket billiards game of one pocket. Most one pocket players had traditionally demonstrated a conservative tableside demeanor, but when Allen hit the pool scene, he was flamboyant, often entertaining the spectators. This created quite a different atmosphere in pool competitions. Because of his charismatic personality, the one pocket game experienced a surge in popularity.

The tournaments were gathering places for the pool players who enjoyed games of stake. Ronnie "Fast Eddie" Allen offered to gamble with anybody when he was in his prime. Often he would walk into a tournament venue and announce that he would play anybody willing to step up, boasting he was the best in the world.

Allen had developed a one-handed skill set that enabled him to get games that he otherwise could not because of his ability to play all games well. He would offer to play one-handed to his opponent's two hands, and this eventually became his trademark handicap, which would often occur in after-hour matches at pool tournaments.

Amarillo Slim in his book recalls Ronnie's banter in the pool room: "I'm called 'Fast Eddie' 'cause I shoot fast, talk fast, and bet fast. I'm the best one pocket player in this country, bar none. I'm so good I can't even get a game unless I give it away first."

Allen was known as a "one pocket specialist."

Billiard Congress of America Hall of Famer Eddie Kelly said, "Ronnie Allen was the best one pocket player I ever played."

At a well-known annual pool event held in Johnston City, Illinois, it was in 1972 that Ronnie Allen grabbed the microphone before a standing-room-only crowd and offered to play any living human being a game of one pocket, spotting them a handicap of 10 to 8. And nobody raised their hand. This was known as Ronnie's standard offer to anyone who wanted to gamble with him.

In a 1972 news broadcast showcasing the Johnston City annual pool tournaments promoted by the Jansco Brothers, the anchor man said this about Ronnie Allen: When "Fast Eddie" Ronnie Allen steps into the red-carpeted pit for a game of 9-ball, the Texas carnival owner will give you a $200 bet faster than Fast Eddie can chalk his cue, and the hustler will shoot as long as the action lasts. More money changes hands in the stands in one hour than a cashier at the Bank of Johnston City sees in a week.

== Filmography ==
In 1972, Allen owned a pool room in North Hollywood, California. One of the frequent patrons was John Brascha aka "John the Dancer," who was a well-known professional dancer in the movies. Brascha agreed to finance a road trip for Ronnie Allen and Ed Kelly, with one stipulation. They must keep him abreast of what happened by reporting to him every couple days. When the trip ended, the three of them cut up $20,000.

A few weeks later, Brascha writes a script about the road trip and sold the rights to Metro-Goldwyn Mayer studios for $125,000. He made appointments for Ronnie and Kelly to meet with the producers. The title of the movie would be "Free Strokin'." Ronnie met with producers Joel Glickman and Danny Selznik and began the negotiations. After a week of consultations with legal counsel, it was recommended that the actor Peter Falk, who was a pool enthusiast, would star in the movie, but after three years, the script reverted to Brascha, when Glickman and Selznik failed to provide funding. Allen and Kelly received token penalty payments, and the script was then sold to Universal Studios.

Kelly left the pool scene and became a card dealer at the MGM casino in Las Vegas, Nevada, but he did accompany Allen to Universal Studios to negotiate brand-new contracts. The name of the movie was then changed to "The Longshot." Joe Don Baker was considered to play Ronnie. Baker was very popular at the time because of his success in the movie Walking Tall.

For reasons unknown, Universal only had the movie six months when it reverted to John Brascha and a producer by the name of Ted Stewart. They were negotiating with Tony Curtis to play Ronnie. At this time, pool began to rise in popularity. Ronnie caught wind of big-time gambling going on in Detroit, Michigan, but he needed a stake. He sought Brascha out to get an advance on the picture profits, but Brascha refused the advance. An argument ensued that eventually led to the parting of ways between Brascha and Allen.

Brascha attempted to salvage the script and not leave himself liable with Ronnie Allen and Ed Kelly. He eliminated certain scenes and substituted others, and the original script, which was supposed to be tailored after Allen and Kelly, then became the film The Baltimore Bullet (1980).

== Titles and achievements ==
- 1962 Cochran's One-Pocket Championship
- 1966 Stardust Open 9-Ball Championship
- 1966 Stardust Open All-Around Championship
- 1970 International 9-Ball Tournament
- 1970 Johnston City One-Pocket Championship
- 1984 Houston Red's Open One-Pocket
- 1988 One-Pocket Challenge Match vs. (Danny DiLiberto)
- 2004 One-Pocket Hall of Fame
