= Jim Rempe =

American pool player (born 1947)

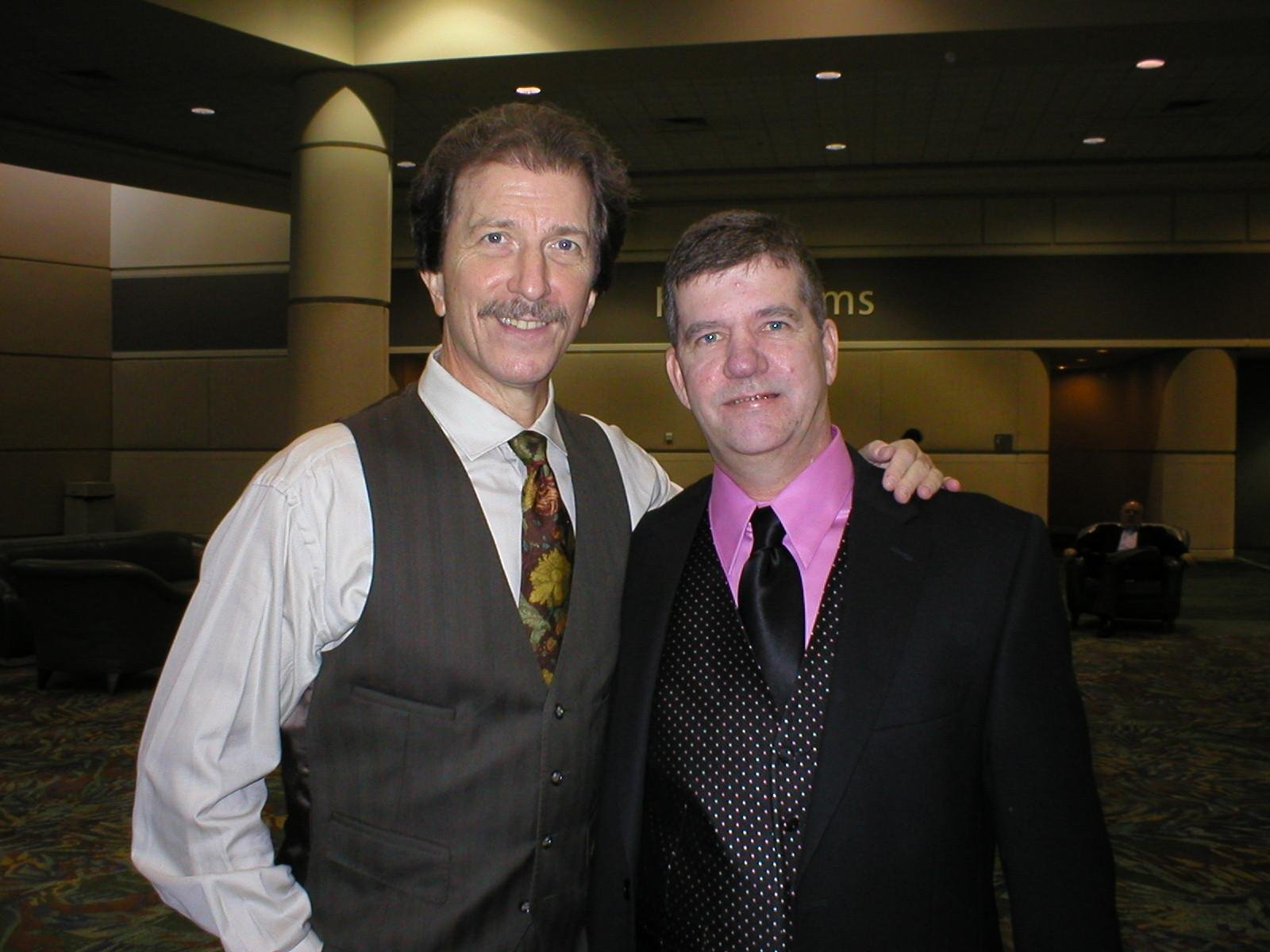
- Rempe and Keith McCready at the King of the Hill Shootout in 2005

Personal information
- Nickname: "King James"
- Born: 4 November 1947 (age 78) Scranton, Pennsylvania, U.S.

Pool career
- Country: United States
- Turned pro: 1970
- Best finish: Quarter finals 1992 WPA World Nine-ball Championship

Tournament wins
- Other titles: 100

James Rempe (born November 4, 1947) is an American professional pocket billiards (pool) player, and was inducted into the Billiard Congress of America's Hall of Fame in 2002.

== Career ==
Rempe was born in Scranton, Pennsylvania, and began playing pool at the age of 6. he turned pro at the age of 22, winning over 100 tournaments in various pool disciplines. A winner of pocket billiard championships, in Nine-ball, Eight-ball and Straight Pool.

He accumulated many tournament wins in the 1970s throughout the United States, Asia and Europe, thus acquiring the nickname "King James".

In 1979, Rempe went to Australia where he defeated World Snooker Championship finalist Eddie Charlton in a series of Nine-ball, Rotation, and Straight Pool. In 1980, Rempe went to New Zealand where he defeated World Snooker Championship finalist Rex Williams in a series of Snooker, English billiards Nine-ball and Rotation.

He represented the USA three times at the Mosconi Cup, most recently in 1999.

In December 2005, Rempe participated in the International Pool Tour IPT King of the Hill Shootout, an invitational event consisting of thirteen BCA Hall of Famers and thirty other accomplished players, in Orlando, Florida. competed in this historic tournament which was televised on the Versus network.

== Snooker venture ==
From 1980 to 1991 Rempe took part in professional snooker events, with his first event being a team event, the 1980 World Challenge Cup, where his team failed to move beyond the group stages. In 1985 Rempe turned professional, achieving his best result in 1987, when he reached the round of 64 during the 1987 World Snooker Championship. There he lost against future 7 time world champion Stephen Hendry by 10 frames to 4. In the world snooker rankings, Rempe achieved his highest ranking in 1987 with 101st place, the highest ranking of any American-born player. He is also the only American-born player to record a century break in professional competition.

== Titles and achievements ==
- 1971 Johnston City One-Pocket Championship
- 1971 U.S. Masters Straight Pool Championship
- 1971 Maine State 14.1 Championship
- 1972 Dayton Open Nine-Ball Championship
- 1972 Minnesota Fats Classic 14.1 Championship
- 1972 U.S. Masters Straight Pool Championship
- 1972 U.S. Masters 9-Ball Championship
- 1973 Forest City Open 9-Ball Championship
- 1973 New York State 14.1 Championship
- 1973 Dayton Open Nine-Ball Championship
- 1974 Eastern 9-Ball Championship
- 1975 U.S. Masters One Pocket Championship
- 1975 U.S. Masters Straight Pool Championship
- 1975 U.S. Masters All-Around Championship
- 1975 Iowa Nine-ball Championship
- 1975 Michiana 14.1 Championship
- 1976 Indiana Open 14.1 Championship
- 1976 All Japan Championship 14.1
- 1976 All Japan Championship All-Around
- 1976 Masters Invitational All-Around Championship
- 1977 Miami Open 9-Ball
- 1977 Brunswick Open 9-Ball
- 1977 Mako Invitational 9-Ball Championship
- 1977 All Japan Championship 14.1
- 1977 All Japan Championship 9-Ball
- 1977 All Japan Championship All-Around
- 1977 Masters Invitational All-Around Championship
- 1978 Swedish Invitational
- 1979 Tokyo Open 9-Ball
- 1979 Pool Challenge Match vs. (Eddie Charlton)
- 1980 Snooker-Pool Challenge Match vs. (Rex Williams)
- 1981 Swedish Open 8-Ball
- 1981 Atari Bar Table 8-Ball Championship
- 1982 Switzerland Open 9-Ball
- 1983 Florida Straight Pool Championship
- 1983 Florida All-Around Championship
- 1984 Masters English Eight-ball Invitational
- 1985 International English Eight-ball Championship
- 1985 Pool Challenge Match vs. (Steve Davis)
- 1986 Resorts International Last Call For 9-Ball
- 1986 New York State 9-Ball Open
- 1987 B.C. Open 9-ball Championship
- 1988 Aspen Invitational All-Around Shootout
- 1990 Classic Invitational 14.1 Championship
- 1991 New York State Straight Pool
- 1991 Sands Regency 9-Ball Open
- 1992 New York State 9-Ball Open
- 1993 Philadelphia 9-Ball Open
- 1993 Rack'M Up Classic 9-Ball
- 1994 New York State 9-Ball Open
- 1995 Eastern States 9-Ball Open
- 1995 Super Billiards Expo Players Championship
- 1997 Mizerak Senior Tour
- 1997 Camel Pro Billiards Tulsa Open
- 1997 Mosconi Cup
- 1998 Joss Tour 9-Ball
- 1998 Mosconi Cup
- 1998 World Pool League
- 1998 Senior Tour Maine 9-Ball Open
- 1998 Ocean State 9-Ball Open
- 1999 Mosconi Cup
- 1998 World Pool League
- 1999 American Seniors 9-Ball Open
- 1999 Senior Tour Shooters 9-Ball Open
- 2000 Joss 9-Ball Tour
- 2000 Nick Vlahos Memorial Open
- 2000 Joss 9-Ball Tour
- 2002 Annual Mary Cappotto Memorial
- 2002 Joss 9-Ball Tour
- 2002 Billiard Congress of America Hall of Fame
