= Patrick Fleming =

Patrick or Pat Fleming may refer to:

- Patrick Fleming (Franciscan), Irish Franciscan scholar
- Patrick Fleming (highwayman) (died 1650), Irish highwayman
- Patrick D. Fleming (1918–1956), World War II U.S. Navy fighter ace
- Pat Fleming (pool player) (born 1948), American pocket billiards (pool) player, founder of Accu-Stats Video, and BCA Hall of Fame inductee
- Pat Fleming (politician) (born 1949), state senator in Arizona, and a former US Army analyst
- Pat Fleming (Canadian football) (born 1978), former Canadian Football League punter and placekicker
