= Allen Hopkins (pool player) =

American pool player (born 1951)

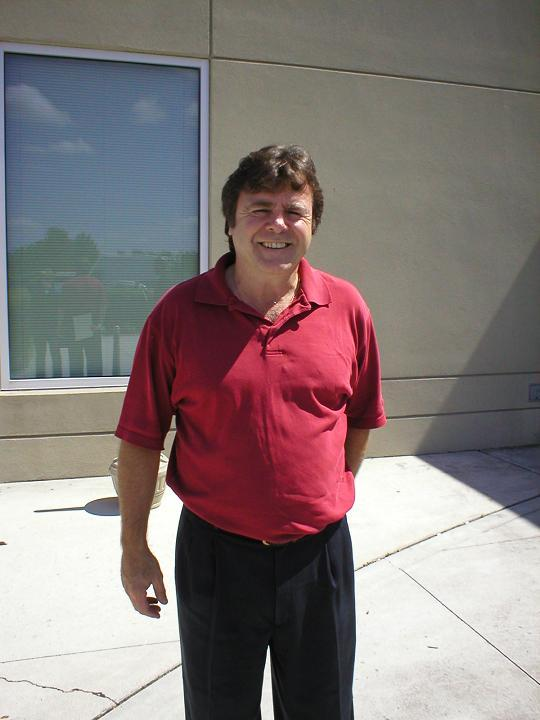

Personal information
- Nickname: "Young Hoppe"
- Born: 18 November 1951 (age 74) Elizabeth, New Jersey, U.S.

Pool career
- Country: United States
- Turned pro: 1971
- Best finish: Quarter finals 1990 WPA World Nine-ball Championship

Tournament wins
- Other titles: 50
- World Champion: Straight Pool (1977)

Allen Hopkins (born November 18, 1951) is an American professional pocket billiards (pool) player, professional billiards color commentator and BCA Hall of Fame inductee. He promotes multiple annual pool events and still competes as a professional contender.

== Early life ==
Allen Hopkins was born November 18, 1951, in Elizabeth, New Jersey, and was raised in the small suburban town of Cranford, New Jersey by adoptive parents Paul and Marietta Hopkins.

== Amateur days ==
At seven years old, after watching many tournaments on television, Allen began to play pool on a small table his parents bought for him. As an amateur, at the age of 12, Hopkins ran a prodigious 110 balls and took this talent to play against grown men.

== Pool career ==
Hopkins' professional career began in the 1970s and spans over four decades. He co-founded and served on the board the now-defunct Professional Pool Players Association (PPPA), as well as president of the Professional Billiard Association (PBA).

At the 1979 PPPA World Open 14.1 Pocket Billiard Championship in New York City, New York, Hopkins posted the largest victory margin in the event, defeating Richie Florence, 150–1.

Allen Hopkins has earned titles in such varied events as the 1977 World Straight Pool Championship, the 1978 and 1981 U.S. Open 9-Ball Championships, the 1990 Cleveland Open 10-Ball Classic and the 1991 Legends of One-Pocket event.

In both 1986 and 1987, Hopkins was the All Japan Championship all around champion.

In 1993, he saw victory in the International Challenge of Champions.

Allen Hopkins has a high run of 410 in straight pool (14.1 continuous), and has run 15-and-out three times, in the game of one-pocket.

In 2002, Hopkins triumphed in the Denver Ten-ball Open, defeating Earl Strickland, Filipino champion Jose Parica, Corey Deuel, David Matlock, and faced Shannon Daulton in a thrilling double-hill finals.

In 2008, he was inducted to the BCA Hall of Fame by the Billiard Congress of America.

== Titles & achievements ==
- 1972 Hi-Cue Warm Up 14.1 Championship
- 1973 Palmer Cue Open 14.1 Championship
- 1973 Garden State 14.1 Championship
- 1973 New Jersey State 14.1 Championship
- 1974 Empire Billiards 14.1 Championship
- 1974 New Jersey State 14.1 Championship
- 1977 PPPA World Straight Pool Championship
- 1978 U.S. Open Nine-ball Championship
- 1980 Baltimore Bullet 9-Ball Open
- 1981 Cue Club 9-Ball Open
- 1981 U.S. Open Nine-ball Championship
- 1983 Meucci Rivermont 9-Ball Championship
- 1984 Texas River City 9-Ball Open
- 1985 B.C. Open 9-Ball Pro-Am Doubles
- 1986 Atlanta Open 9-Ball
- 1986 All Japan Championship 14.1
- 1986 All Japan Championship All-Around
- 1987 Eastern States 9-Ball Open
- 1987 Meucci 9-Ball Championship
- 1987 All Japan Championship 14.1
- 1987 All Japan Championship Rotation
- 1987 All Japan Championship All-Around
- 1988 Coors Valley Forge 9-Ball Open
- 1990 River City Invitational Nine-Ball
- 1990 Cleveland Open 10-Ball Classic
- 1990 Rocket City 9-Ball Championship
- 1991 Legends of One-Pocket Championship
- 1991 Billiards Digest Best One-Pocket Player
- 1993 International Challenge of Champions
- 1996 PCA Hollywood Park Challenge
- 1996 Mosconi Cup
- 1999 Camel Denver 10-Ball Open
- 2002 Denver 10-Ball Open
- 2003 Border Battle, Team USA VS Team Canada
- 2008 Billiard Congress of America Hall of Fame
- 2010 One Pocket Hall of Fame

== Sportscasting and event promotion ==
Allen Hopkins Productions started the Super Billiards Expo, each year held in Valley Forge, Pennsylvania, which has since become the biggest consumer-oriented trade show in the Billiards industry trade show in the world, with multiple tournaments for amateur, seniors, women and men professional player levels.

He has combined efforts with Billiards International and promoted pocket billiards exhibitions like the Skins Billiards Championship, the Texas Hold'em Billiards Championship, and two short-lived competitions, the Million Dollar Nine-Ball Shootout, and (with business partner Mike Andrews) the Team DMIRO tour.

Sporting positions
Preceded by Mike Sigel	US Open Nine-ball Champion; 1978	Succeeded by Steve Mizerak
Preceded by Mike Sigel	US Open Nine-ball Champion; 1981	Succeeded by Mike Sigel
