= Jimmy Mataya =

American pool player (1950–2024)

Personal information
- Nickname: "Pretty Boy Floyd"
- Born: September 25, 1950 Perth Amboy, New Jersey, U.S.
- Died: March 22, 2024 (aged 73) Henderson, Nevada, U.S.

Pool career
- Country: United States
- Turned pro: 1966
- Pool games: Nine-Ball

Tournament wins
- Other titles: 30

Jimmy Mataya (September 25, 1950 – March 22, 2024) was an American pool player and actor.

== Life and career ==
Mataya started shooting pool at age 11. Within a few years was playing exhibitions with Willie Mosconi. He then won three consecutive Michigan State Championships in 1966, 1967 and 1968. At 21, he won the 1971 Los Angeles 9-Ball Championship. Mataya won multiple titles in his career and in 1989 became a member of the Greater Lansing Area Sports Hall of Fame.

In 1982, Mataya wed Ewa Svensson, of Sweden (who was later inducted into Billiard Congress of America's Hall of Fame as Ewa Laurance in 2004), forming pool's first "power couple". Their daughter Nikki was born in 1985. Jimmy and Ewa later divorced.

Mataya enjoys other games of stake. In 1991, he was seen leaving Las Vegas in a brand-new Cadillac, courtesy of the Sahara Casino. In that same year Snap Magazine published an "...in-depth interview with Mataya, who offered many tips for young players and talked about his vision for the future of the sport."

Mataya died in Henderson, Nevada on March 22, 2024, at the age of 73.

== Professional career ==
- 1966 Lansing City 14.1 Championship
- 1966 Michigan State 14.1 Championship
- 1967 Lansing City 14.1 Championship
- 1967 Michigan State 14.1 Championship
- 1968 Lansing City 14.1 Championship
- 1968 Michigan State 14.1 Championship
- 1969 Michigan State 14.1 Championship
- 1970 Michigan State 14.1 Championship
- 1971 Los Angeles 9-Ball Championship
- 1971 Wheaton Open Straight Pool Tournament
- 1972 Dayton Open All-Around Championship
- 1972 Stardust Open 9-Ball Championship
- 1972 Stardust Open All-Around Championship
- 1973 Nevada State 14.1 Championship
- 1974 Michigan State 14.1 Championship
- 1974 Nevada State 14.1 Championship
- 1976 Albuquerque 8-Ball Championship
- 1976 Albuquerque All-Around Championship
- 1977 Dayton Open 8-Ball Championship
- 1978 Pro-Celebrity 9-Ball Tournament
- 1978 Port Angeles Open 9-Ball
- 1988 B.C. Open 9-Ball Pro-Am Doubles
- 1989 Greater Lansing Area Sports Hall of Fame

== Filmography ==
When Mataya left the professional pool tournament trail, he was chosen to be a commentator for pool matches because of his knowledge of the game and his comedic style that entertains the audience. "To add more color to an already colorful show, Mataya was selected as a co-commentator with Danny Diliberto at the 2004 Derby City Classic Nine-ball Ring Game in Louisville, Kentucky, the first ring game produced for broadcast.

- Secrets of Pool Hustling (video, 1989), as himself
- Pool the Master's Way (video, 1989), as himself, with Steve Mizerak and Ewa Mataya
- The Color of Money (1986), as Julian's friend in the green room
- The Baltimore Bullet (1980), as himself
- Vega$: "The Usurper" Sept. 26, 1979, as himself
