= Keith McCready =

American pool player

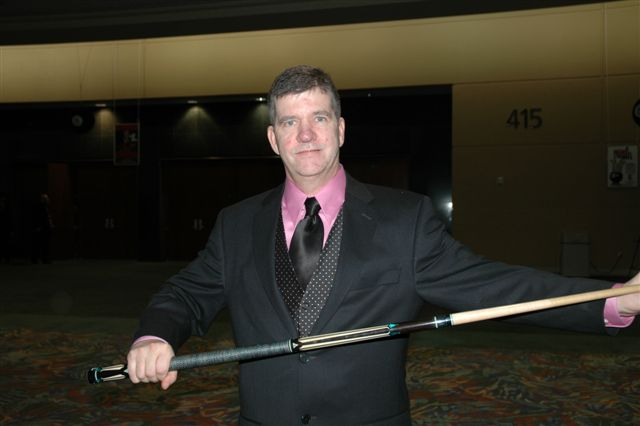
- McCready at International Pool Tour King of the Hill event December 2005

Personal information
- Nickname: "Earthquake"
- Born: Keith Howard McCready; April 9, 1957 (age 69) Elmhurst, Illinois, US
- Occupations: Pocket billiards player, actor, columnist
- Life partner: Jennie Ann (2002–present)

Sport
- Country: United States
- Sport: Pocket Billiards

Keith McCready (born April 9, 1957) is an American professional pool player who played under the nickname "Earthquake". At one time considered among the top players in America, McCready has been a traveling tournament competitor and notorious hustler since the 1970s. Known for comedically interacting with the audience during matches, McCready was also a contributing writer for InsidePool magazine between 2003 and 2006. He also had a supporting role as the hustler Grady Seasons in the 1986 film The Color of Money.

An energetic and aggressive player, he has a distinctive side-arm stroke and, despite his unusual form, is well known for strong shot-making offense skills, often executing extremely difficult shots that most other players would not attempt. In 2018, Keith McCready was given the Lifetime of Pool in Action Award at the One Pocket Hall of Fame banquet.

== Personal life ==
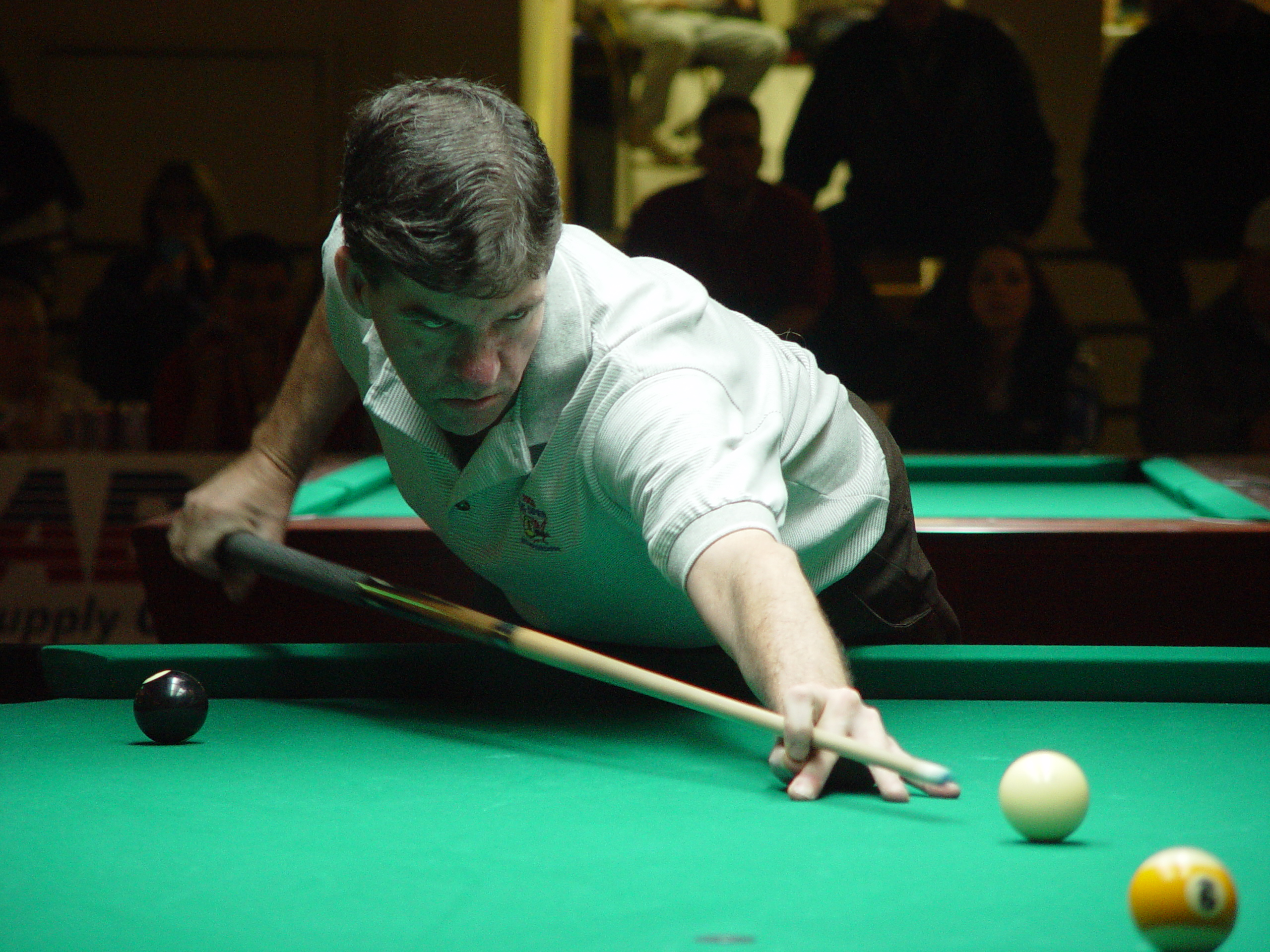
Side-arm stroke of Keith McCready

McCready was born on April 9, 1957, in Elmhurst, Illinois, later moving to Anaheim, California, with his brother and father. He initially had to stand on a box to reach the height of the table, and developed his unusual "sidewinder" stroke while still a boy. He was reportedly habituated to gambling by his divorced father when, during custodial visits, Keith and his brothers would each be given $20 and required to play various games with him, "usually until he had won his money back".

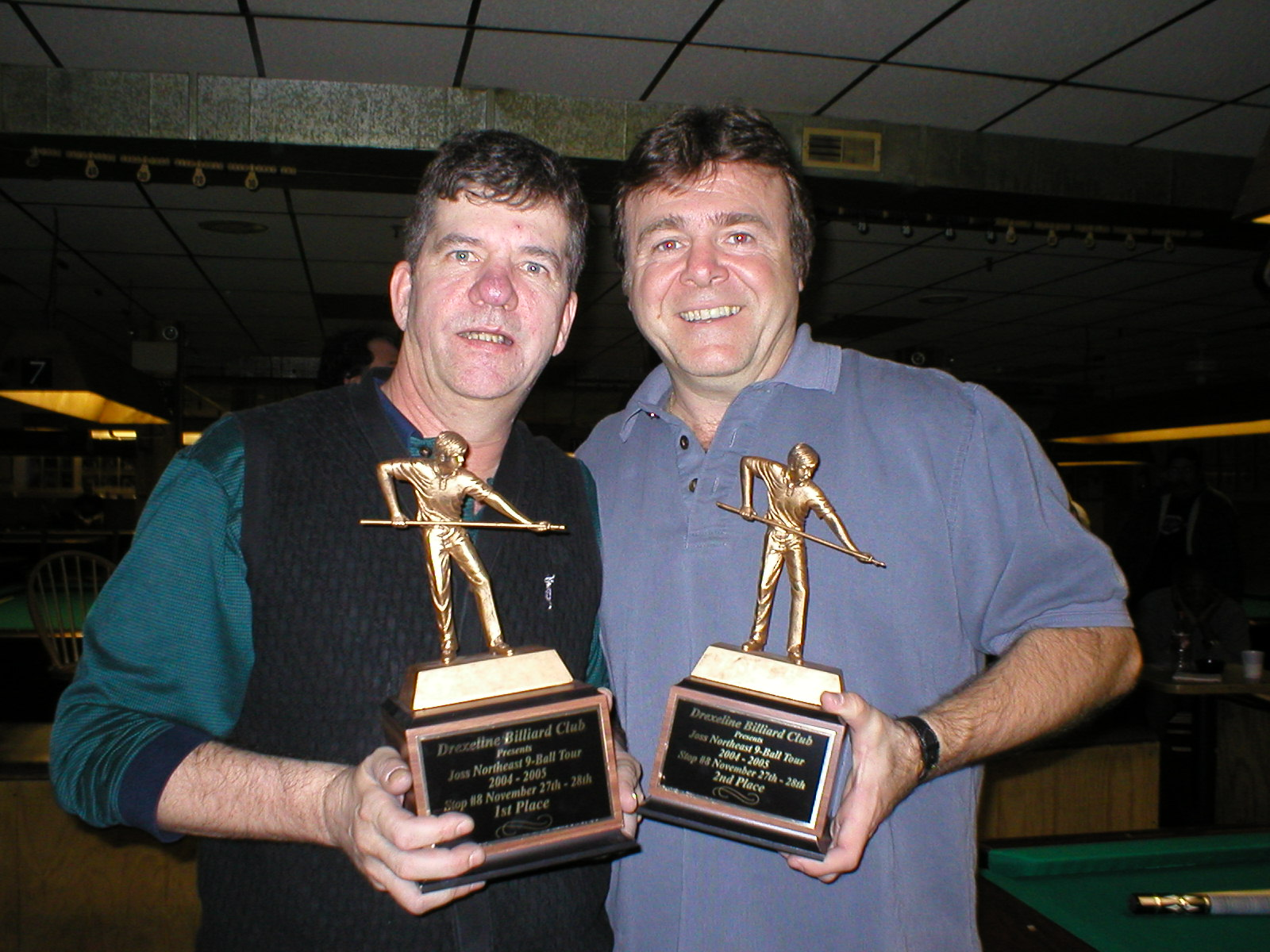
Keith McCready first place and Allen Hopkins second place at the Joss Northeast Nine-Ball Tour tournament in 2004.

An established gambler at a young age, McCready had won a large amount gambling the night before at the horse racetrack. He was afraid to leave the money at home, for fear that his two older brothers would help themselves to it, and he did not want to leave it in his school locker for the same reason. When his teacher saw that it was the sum of $14,000 in gambling winnings, McCready was suspended from school "for having too much money". Danny Diliberto was living in Bellflower, California, during this time. He learned about the incident when he asked why young McCready was hanging in the pool room instead of attending school. The school officials contacted the California Department of Social Services to investigate his home environment, which had deteriorated after the death of his mother. His father had developed problems with alcoholism. Placed in foster care, Keith was removed from his family home and made a ward of the state. The owner of his neighborhood pool room, Bob's Billiards, liked McCready and successfully petitioned to adopt him.

As a teenager in California, McCready was mentored by Cole Dixon, an older California player who showed McCready how to survive as a pool player, and inspired Rudolf Wanderone, whom he had met as an adolescent. McCready was considered an old-school player who was fast and accurate at the table, acquiring the nickname "Keither with the Ether". However, he was later given the nickname "Earthquake". Today, McCready resides in Washington, DC. He was inducted into the One Pocket Hall of Fame in January 2018 for a "Lifetime of Pool in Action".

In the late 2000s, McCready became a columnist for InsidePool magazine.

== Professional career ==
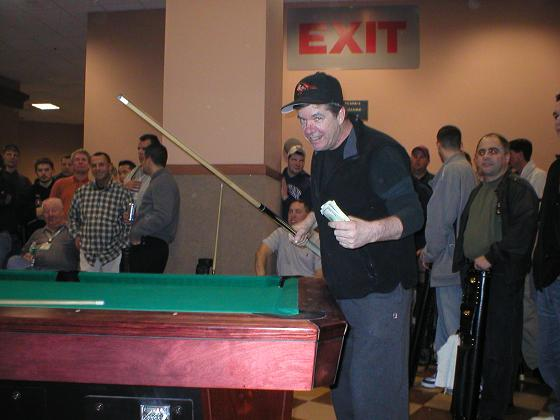
McCready at the Super Billiards Expo at Valley Forge, Pennsylvania, in 2004.

When McCready was 21, he began competing at professional pool events throughout California. He made an impression in the final of the Sacramento Open; from 2–6 behind, he won the last nine racks of nine-ball in the final to defeat Larry Hubbart, 11–6. McCready won the 1984 Clyde Childress Memorial 9-Ball Open at The Maverick Club in Richmond, Kentucky; having defeated Earl Strickland 11–2 earlier in the event, McCready again defeated Strickland in the final, 11–9. By June 1985, he was already considered among the top players in the country. McCready scored his first professional win in October 1985 at the B.C. Open 9-ball Championship in Binghamton, New York. Pool veteran player Grady Mathews commented that he was "a worthy champion and a colorful, exciting player, he deserved to win". He won the final 9-3 despite playing the tournament with a borrowed cue stick. At the 5th Sands Regent Open nine-ball tournament, held in June 1987 in Reno, Nevada, and won by Strickland, McCready was documented in the notable matches category by Accu-Stats because of his "brilliant and entertaining" performance, defeating Paul Brienza and Mike Sigel in the event.

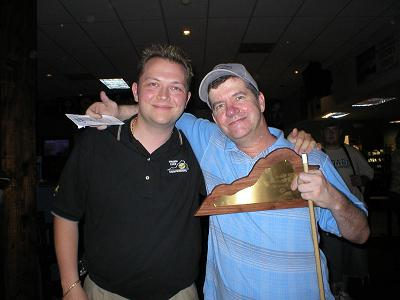
McCready with Josh Dickerson

In April 2005, he won a Joss Northeast Nine-ball Tour event at the Golden Cue in Albany, New York, winning the final match of the double-elimination format event against Canadian pool player Danny Hewitt.

In December 1998, he was ranked 10th on the men's professional pool tour. While McCready won a few titles during his career, he was known for high-wager matches. Danny DiLiberto (now an Accu-Stats Video Productions commentator) has stated: "I like Keith McCready, he's entertaining all the time; he's colorful to watch, because he's going to shoot at a white flag. He doesn't play the score; he could be winning 7 to 1 and he's still going to shoot at a crazy shot that he could lose with. But he's a colorful person, so I like doing commentary on him." McCready continued to compete professionally as well as putting on exhibitions for charity events as late as 2005, winning the 2005 Virginia State Nine-Ball Championship title.

== Filmography ==
In 1986, McCready played as the character Grady Seasons, a fictional infamous, sharking hustler and top money-winner in all of pool, with Paul Newman and Tom Cruise in Martin Scorsese's Academy Award-winning film The Color of Money. In 1985, Martin Scorsese, Tom Cruise, and Scorsese's casting director, Gretchen Rennell, had come to Norfolk, Virginia, to the US Open Nine-ball Championship in search of actual pool personalities to play character roles. McCready was engaged in a stakes game with Efren Reyes and was selected to be in the movie because of his entertaining style of play. McCready had an established reputation in pool circles as one of the most feared money players.

== Career titles and achievements ==
- 1979 Sacramento 9-Ball Open
- 1983 King of the Hill
- 1984 Clyde Childress Memorial 9-Ball Open
- 1985 B.C. Open 9-ball Championship
- 1987 Southern California 9-Ball Open
- 1991 Lexington All-Star 9-Ball
- 1994 Smokey Mountain 9-Ball Shootout
- 2004 Northeast 9-Ball Tour
- 2005 Virginia State 9-Ball Championship
- 2017 Lifetime Pool in Action Award
