= Danny DiLiberto =

American pool player (1935–2025)

Personal information
- Nickname: "Buffalo Danny"
- Born: February 19, 1935 Buffalo, New York, U.S.
- Died: February 11, 2025 (aged 89) Cape Coral, Florida, U.S.

Pool career
- Country: United States
- Turned pro: 1960
- Pool games: Straight pool, one-pocket, nine-ball, eight-ball

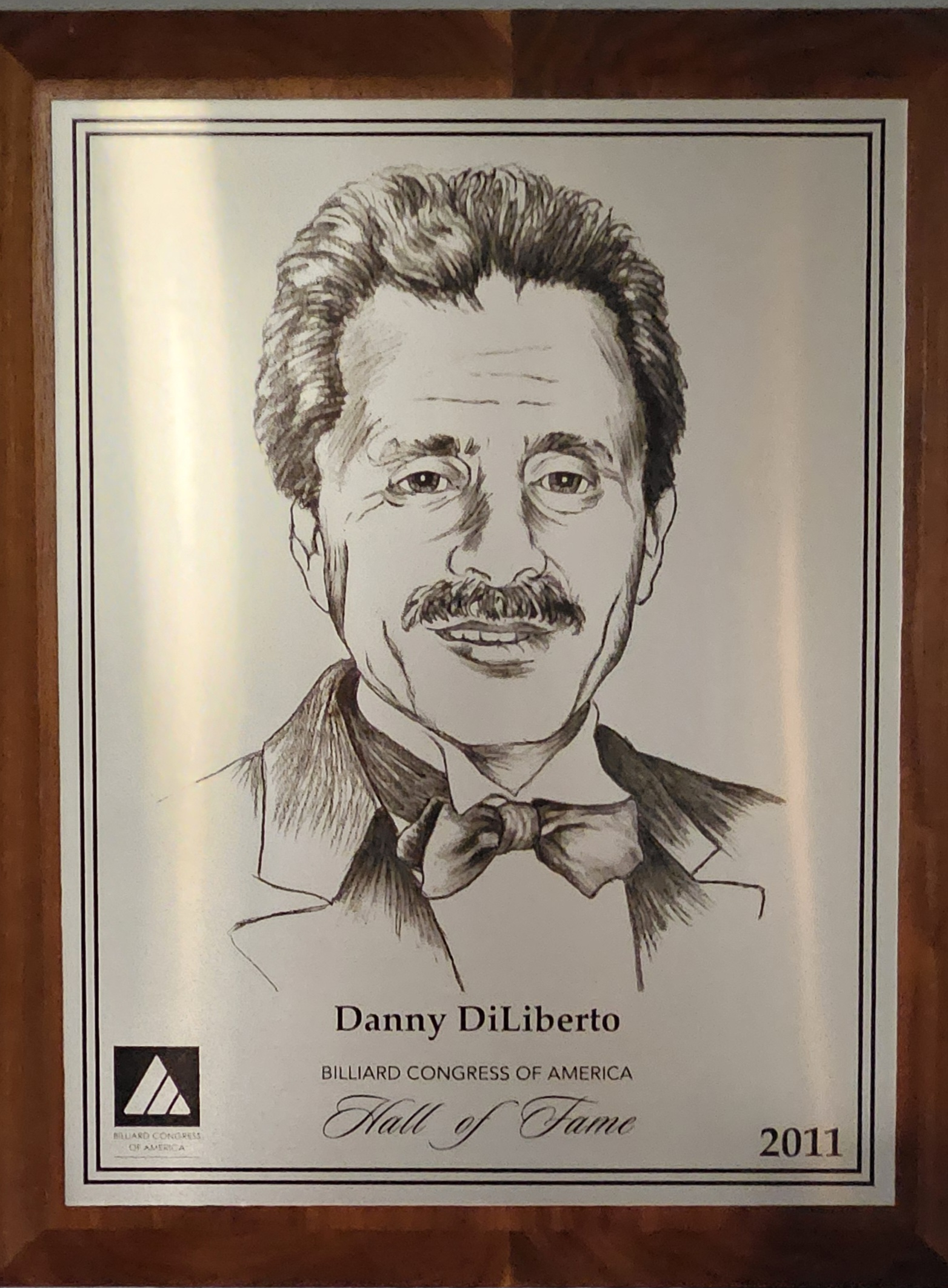
2011 BCA Hall of Fame Award

Danny DiLiberto (February 19, 1935 – February 11, 2025) was an American professional pool player, professional boxer and billiard commentator nicknamed "Buffalo Danny".

One of the last living veteran players from the Johnston City era, a teacher, an author, and previously working as a commentator for Accu-Stats, DiLiberto was an active member of the pocket billiards community. He was inducted to the One Pocket Hall of Fame in 2004 for his "outstanding contribution to the legacy of the game of one pocket" and in 2017 he was inducted in the Buffalo Sports Hall of Fame.

== Early boxing days ==
Before DiLiberto became interested in pocket billiards, he was a professional boxer from 1957 to 1959 with a 14–0–1 record, with 12 knockouts, until he was forced into retirement after breaking his hands four times. Muhammad Ali's trainer Angelo Dundee remarked that "Danny was a heck of a fighter", "Whoever I put in front of him he knocked out. If it weren't for his brittle hands, he would have been a champion." In 2006, he was inducted into Buffalo's Boxing Hall of Fame for his accomplishments in the sport and in 2017 Buffalo Sports Hall of Fame.

== Professional career ==
The 1981 BCA National Eight-Ball Championship was a memorable victory for DiLiberto when he faced Nick Varner in the finals. Running out the deciding match was most appropriate for DiLiberto in what was until then a neck-and-neck race to 7 for the win.

DiLiberto was a member of the International Pool Tour.

A book was written by pool journalist Jerry Forsyth about Danny DiLiberto entitled "Road Player, the Danny DiLiberto Story".

On October 20, 2011, DiLiberto was inducted into the Billiard Congress of America's Hall of Fame. The ceremony took place alongside the 36th annual US Open 9-Ball Championships.

DiLiberto had won tournaments in four different divisions of professional pocket billiards: straight pool, one pocket, 8 ball, and 9 ball having won titles in the 60's, 70's, 80's & 90's.

From 1989 to 2020 DiLiberto was a commentator for Accu-Stats Video Productions along with long time friend and pro player Billy Incardona. DiLiberto died in Cape Coral, Florida, on February 11, 2025, at the age of 89.

== Career titles & achievements ==
- 1961 New York City 14.1 Championship
- 1962 New York State 14.1 Championship
- 1963 U.S. Masters Straight Pool Championship
- 1965 Florida State 14.1 Championship
- 1966 Florida State 14.1 Championship
- 1968 Florida State 14.1 Championship
- 1969 U.S. Masters Straight Pool Championship
- 1972 Ohio State 14.1 Championship
- 1972 Johnston City Straight Pool Championship
- 1972 Johnston City All-Around Championship
- 1974 Florida State 14.1 Championship
- 1981 BCA National 8-Ball Championship
- 1982 Anheuser-Busch Open 9-Ball Championship
- 1983 Florida Open 9-Ball
- 1983 Florida One Pocket Championship
- 1984 Classic Cup IV 9-Ball
- 1985 Austin One Pocket Championship
- 1985 Eastern States Open 14.1
- 1989 Western States Open 9-Ball Championship
- 1990 ESPN Mixed Doubles 9-Ball Championship (With Robin Dodson)
- 1996 Senior Tour Virginia 9-Ball Open
- 1997 French Open National Nine Ball Tournament
- 1998 French Open National Nine Ball Tournament
- 2004 One Pocket Hall of Fame
- 2006 Buffalo Boxing Hall of Fame
- 2011 Billiard Congress of America Hall of Fame
- 2017 Buffalo Sports Hall of Fame
