= Pat Fleming (pool player) =

American professional pocket billiards player

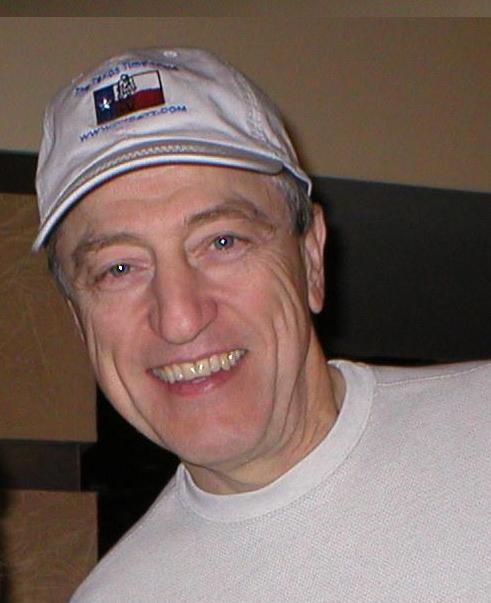
Pat Fleming at 2004 Glass City Open in Toledo, Ohio

Pat Fleming (born 1948) is an American professional pocket billiards player and the founder of Accu-Stats Video Productions. Fleming is the fifty-third inductee into the Billiard Congress of America's Hall of Fame, recognized in the Meritorious Service category on June 12, 2008. In 1983, Fleming invented the Total Performance Average (TPA), a statistical performance analysis system, which is currently the standard metric for professionals.

== Career ==
As a child, Fleming had a keen interest in statistics. At the age of nine, when he began learning the game of pocket billiards, he made detailed records of his runs, how much he played, and his practice time. His love of statistics is how he came to create the Accu-Stats score-keeping system, which is still used today to measure the accuracy of pool games.

Pat Fleming played straight pool in the 1970s and early 1980s. A notable contribution of his is the creation and development of Accu-Stats Video Productions, based in Butler, New Jersey. Accu-Stats Video Productions has videotaped more than 1,000 tournament matches and preserved performances by the world's greatest pool and billiards players since the mid-1980s. Fleming started the enterprise to document matches for statistical analysis. Now, the Accu-Stats Total Performance Average has become a widely known and recognized measure of pool performance level. Fleming started to offer videotapes of those famous performances and players for sale to players and fans of pocket billiards. Today, the VHS tapes and DVDs are used as entertainment and training tools, along with the being the most complete video record of two generations of famous pool players.

The BCA Hall of Fame Board held a general election deciding if Allen Hopkins and Fleming would be inducted into the BCA Hall of Fame for their careers and their work in early April 2008. The Board has a total of 52 members. Those members are current Hall of Fame members, billiard industry promoters and historians, and members of the billiard media. As it was voted that Hopkins and Fleming would be inducted, they became the fifty-second and fifty-third industry figures inducted into the BCA Hall of Fame, which was established in 1966. Fleming and Hopkins were inducted to the BCA Hall of Fame during the induction ceremony on June 12, 2008, at the Charlotte Convention Center in Charlotte, North Carolina.

== Titles ==
- 1979 Eastern States 14.1 Championship
