= Reed Pierce =

American professional pool player (born 1963)

Personal information
- Born: 24 April 1963 (age 63) Jackson, Mississippi, U.S.

Pool career
- Country: United States
- Best finish: Semi finals 1997 WPA World Nine-ball Championship

Reed Pierce (born April 24, 1963, Jackson, Mississippi) is an American professional pool player. Notable tournament wins include the 1995 US Open Nine-ball Championship, the 1998 Camel Tour Kasson Open, and the 1994 PBT Dallas Open. He was selected to represent the U.S. twice in the Mosconi Cup, in 1997 and 1998.

Today, Reed Pierce and his brother, Ronnie, own an upscale billiards sports bar and restaurant, bearing Reed Pierce's name in Byram, Mississippi. 2018 the bar and grill has been closed. Inside the restaurant is an actual pool room named 9-Ball Lounge, and it has eight Diamond regulation-size pool tables.

== Professional career ==
The 20th Annual US Open Nine-ball Championship was captured by Reed Pierce in 1995, defeating Efren Reyes, the 1994 US Open Nine-ball Champion, 11–6 in the finals, denying Reyes back-to-back wins.

Reed Pierce was selected twice to compete in the Mosconi Cup, a pool tournament named after Willie Mosconi, in 1997 and 1998, as one of six members to represent Team America, an annual nine-ball tournament contested between Europe and the United States. Both years, Team America captured the Mosconi Cup title.

== Titles ==
- 1987 Alabama 9-Ball Open
- 1993 Hot Shots 9-Ball Open
- 1994 PBT Dallas Open
- 1995 US Open Nine-ball Championship
- 1997 Mosconi Cup
- 1998 Camel Kasson Nine-ball Open
- 1998 Mosconi Cup
- 2002 Alabama 9-Ball Classic

Preceded by Efren Reyes	US Open Nine-ball Champion; 1995	Succeeded by Rodney Morris
