= LoreeJon Ogonowski-Brown =

American pool player

Personal information
- Nickname: "Queen of the Hill"
- Born: 6 November 1965 (age 61) Garwood, New Jersey, U.S.

Pool career
- Country: United States
- Turned pro: 1976
- Pool games: Straight pool, nine-ball

Tournament wins
- World Champion: Straight pool (1981, 1986), Nine-ball (1984, 1993)

LoreeJon Ogonowski-Brown (formerly LoreeJon Jones, LoreeJon Hasson, sometimes known mononymically as LoreeJon; born November 6, 1965) is a professional pool player.

A child prodigy who began playing at the age of 4 at her home in Garwood, New Jersey, she picked up the game from her father, John Ogonowski.

Recognizing her talent, her father built wooden boxes around the table so she would be the correct height for him to teach her the sport. Her father was her instructor, and her mother became her daily practice partner. She ran her first rack of balls at age 5. She performed her first three trick shots at age 6 in Chicago at a men's World Straight Pool tournament. At age 11, she became a pro player with the Women's Professional Billiard Association (WPBA) and came to be known as "Queen of the Hill".

Aged 15, she won the Women's World Straight Pool Championship, becoming the youngest player, male or female, ever to win a world championship. From 1981 to 1996, she won many tournaments, three WPBA National Championships, BCA U.S. Open Straight Pool Championship, WPBA U.S. Open 9-ball Championship, and the All Japan Championship. When she won the WPA World Nine-ball Championship, she had held every title possible in women's professional pool. At the time of her 2002 induction into the Billiard Congress of America Hall of Fame, and 2008 Women's Professional Billiard Association Hall of Fame, she held over 50 major titles, and over the course of her career was recognized five times as "Player of the Year" by Pool & Billiards Magazine and Billiards Digest.

Coming out of retirement and making a comeback, Ogonowski-Brown won the 2017 Super Billiards Expo Players Championship. She was inducted into the National Polish-American Sports Hall of Fame in June 2022.

== Titles and achievements ==
- 1981 WPBA World Straight Pool Championship
- 1981 New Jersey State 9-ball Championship
- 1981 Ruth McGinnis Challenge Cup
- 1981 Billiards Digest Player of the Year
- 1983 New Jersey State 9-ball Championship
- 1984 WPBA World 9-ball Championship
- 1985 Houston Red's 9-ball Open
- 1985 Motor City 9-ball Open
- 1986 WPBA World Straight Pool Championship
- 1987 B.C. Open 9-ball Championship
- 1987 Carolina's Cup
- 1988 King of the Rings 9-ball
- 1988 King of the Rings Mixed Doubles – with (Mike Sigel)
- 1988 Cleveland Spring 9-ball Open
- 1988 B.C. Open 9-ball Championship
- 1988 WPBA National Championship
- 1988 Billiards Digest Player of the Year
- 1989 BCA U.S. Open Straight Pool Championship
- 1989 WPBA U.S. Open 9-ball Championship
- 1989 B.C. Open 9-ball Championship
- 1989 Coors Valley Forge 9-ball Open
- 1989 Billiards Digest Player of the Year
- 1990 All Japan Championship 9-ball
- 1990 B.C. Open 9-ball Championship
- 1990 WPBA National Championship
- 1991 McDermott Masters 9-ball Championship
- 1992 BCA U.S. Open Straight Pool Championship
- 1993 WPA World 9-ball Championship
- 1993 WPBA National Championship
- 1993 McDermott Milwaukee Classic
- 1993 BCA Charlotte Classic
- 1993 Detroit Classic
- 1993 Sacramento Classic
- 1993 Billiards Digest Player of the Year
- 1994 Connelly Billiards 9-Ball Championship
- 1995 Baltimore Billiard Classic
- 1995 St. Croix Press Twin Cities Classic
- 1995 Gordon's Nashville 9-ball
- 1995 Gordon's Chicago 9-ball
- 1995 Gordon's San Francisco 9-ball
- 1995 Billiards Digest Player of the Year
- 1996 Gordon's Los Angeles 9-ball Championship
- 2002 Billiard Congress of America Hall of Fame
- 2008 WPBA Hall of Fame
- 2017 Super Billiards Expo Players Championship
- 2022 National Polish-American Sports Hall of Fame

Preceded by Franziska Stark	WPA Women's World Nine-ball Champion; 1993	Succeeded by Ewa Laurance
