= Billy Incardona =

American pool player

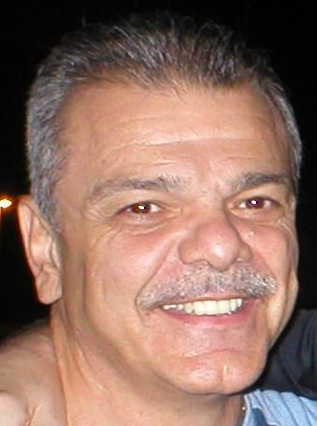

Billy Incardona (born December 2, 1943) is an American professional pool player.

"Pittsburgh Billy" was inducted into the One Pocket Hall of Fame in 2007 for his outstanding contribution to the legacy of the game of one pocket.

In addition to playing pool, Incardona is a professional broadcaster for pocket billiards competitions around the world.

== Early life ==
Born in Pittsburgh, Pennsylvania, to Frantone and Mamie Incardona. Billy first picked up a cue stick at the age of 12, playing on a wooden mini table using a checker disk as the cue ball. Due to age restrictions, he was not allowed to remain in billiard parlors, but developed his game by sneaking in and playing unnoticed. In 1972, he was considered one of the top 9-Ball players in the country.

== Professional career ==
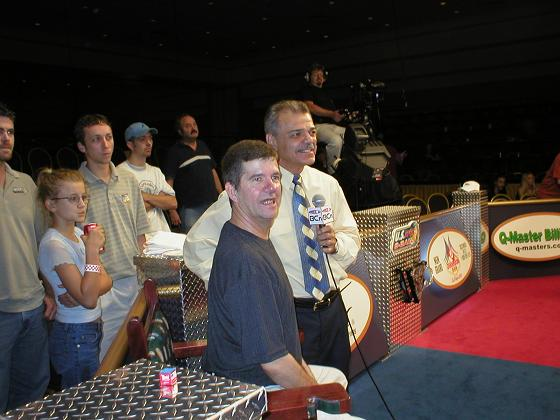
Incardona commentating for Accu-Stats Video Productions at 2003 U.S. Open 9-Ball Championships.

In Detroit, Michigan during the 1970s, Incardona frequented the Capital Cue Club when games of stake were plentiful. He would often show up at pool tournaments and match up brilliantly, taking home the cash.

In 2005, he was selected to be one of the 150 members of the International Pool Tour at its genesis, without qualifying.

=== Commentator ===
Incardona is a commentator for many pocket billiards events. He has been commentating for Accu-Stats Video Productions since 1989.

== Filmography ==
Incardona produced an instructional video entitled "Common Sense One Pocket" and is featured on Accu-Stats Highlight Video Volume I. He also made an instructional DVD to learn how to play the pocket billiard game of one pocket.

== Titles and achievements ==
- 1972 Johnston City 9-Ball Division
- 1985 Billiard Cafe 9-Ball Open
- 1997 Senior Tour 9-Ball Championship
- 2007 One Pocket Hall of Fame
- 2016 Seniors One-Pocket Classic
- 2026 Billiard Congress of America Hall of Fame
- 2026 Best in Billiards 250 years- Best Broadcaster Award
