= Kim Davenport =

American pool player (born 1944)

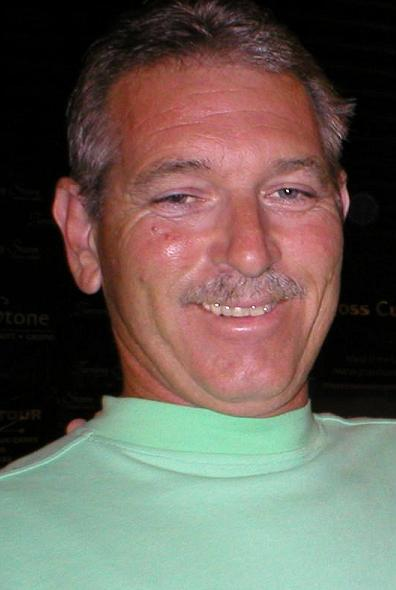
- Davenport at the 2006 Joss Northeast Nine-ball Tour

Personal information
- Nickname: "Kimmer"
- Born: 15 November 1955 McAlester, Oklahoma, U.S.

Pool career
- Country: United States
- Best finish: Semi finals 1992 WPA World Nine-ball Championship

Tournament wins
- Other titles: 50

Kim Davenport (born November 15, 1955, in McAlester, Oklahoma) is an American professional pocket billiards (pool) player, nicknamed "Kimmer".

== Professional career ==
He became a professional player in 1985.

Davenport is an originator of target pool.

Winner of over 50 professional tournaments, Davenport has represented the United States as a three-time member and two-time captain of the Team USA at the Mosconi Cup.

He was also a member of the International Pool Tour,

Davenport has only limited vision in his right eye, the result of a golf accident at a local driving range on November 16, 2002. The setback came during a period in which Davenport had regained a spot in the men's top 10 rankings of the United States Professional Poolplayers Association. "I've been playing well", Davenport said. "But if I never get to play pool again, I've had 17 great years. It's just a bad roll. A nice sunny day that went dark."

Kim and wife Aida have one son and two grandchildren.

He and American champion Johnny Archer operated a pool room in Marietta, Georgia, named the Marietta Billiard Club.

Davenport became a member of the BCA Hall of Fame (2018).

== Career titles ==
- 1984 Labour Day Open 9-Ball
- 1985 Kentucky Open 9-Ball
- 1986 California Open 9-Ball
- 1987 Tar Heel Open 9-Ball
- 1987 B.C. Open 9-Ball Pro-Am Doubles
- 1988 Capital City Mini Open 9-Ball
- 1988 Japan 9-Ball Cup
- 1988 Eastern States Open 9-Ball
- 1989 Lexington All-Star Nine-ball
- 1989 Greensboro Open 9-Ball
- 1989 McDermott Masters 9-Ball Championship
- 1990 Brunswick Swedish 9-Ball Cup
- 1990 Sands Regency 9-Ball Open
- 1990 B.C. Open 9-Ball Championship
- 1990 Billiards Digest Players of the Year
- 1992 Lexington All-Star Nine-ball
- 1993 Tommy Billiards Open 9-Ball
- 1993 Hard Times Open 9-Ball
- 1993 San Francisco Classic
- 1994 PBT Pro Tour Nine-Ball Championship
- 1995 PBT Chalkers 9-Ball Classic
- 1996 Sunset Royal 9-Ball Open
- 1997 Sands Regency 9-Ball Open
- 1997 Mosconi Cup
- 1998 Mosconi Cup
- 1999 Mosconi Cup
- 2000 U.S. Bar Table 9-Ball Championship
- 2000 Hard Times 9-Ball Open
- 2001 U.S. Bar Table 8-Ball Championship
- 2002 Sands Regency 9-Ball Open
- 2018 Billiard Congress of America Hall of Fame
