= B.C. Open 9-ball Championship =

The B.C. Open 9-Ball Championship was a pool tournament played annually at the Holiday Inn Arena in Binghamton, New York. The event was created and promoted by professional player and promoter Gary Pinkowski. Pinkowski was a Johnson City, New York native. The tournament commenced in the same week as the B.C. Open golf tournament. The inaugural tournament took place from August 28, 1985 to September 2, with a prize of $25,000 awarded to the champion. The following years the champion was awarded $10,000. The event ran until 1990.

During the 1987 B.C. open Jean Balukas was scheduled to play in both the men's and women's events. After arriving at the tournament she learned that there was a dress code for the ladies and not for the men. She did not have formal attire with her and realizing how important a figure she was to the sport she protested the dress code and after a vote by the other participants was not able to play in the women's division. She was hurt by the fact that she was trying to stand up for a cause and the other women, including personal friends, voted against her playing and held the event anyway.

== Event winners ==
Mens Division

Year	Winner	Runner-up
1985	(United States) Keith McCready	(Puerto Rico) Mike Lebrón
1986	(United States) Mike Sigel	(Puerto Rico) Mike Lebrón
1987	(United States) Jim Rempe	(United States) Kim Davenport
1988	(United States) Dave Bollman	(United States) Kim Davenport
1989	(United States) Mike Sigel (2)	(United States) Nick Varner
1990	(United States) Kim Davenport	(United States) Mike Sigel

Pro-Am Doubles Division

Year	Winner
1985	(United States) Allen Hopkins / Jack Caprio
1986	(United States) Earl Strickland / Joe Inman
1987	(United States) Kim Davenport / Johnny Hart
1988	(United States) Jimmy Mataya / Joe Probst
1989	(United States) Johnny Archer / Rod Curl
1990	(United States) Robin Bell / Rod Curl

Ladies Division

Year	Winner
1987	(United States) LoreeJon Ogonowski-Brown
1988	(United States) LoreeJon Ogonowski-Brown (2)
1989	(United States) LoreeJon Ogonowski-Brown (3)
1990	(United States) LoreeJon Ogonowski-Brown (4)
