= Mike Sigel =

American pool player (born 1953)

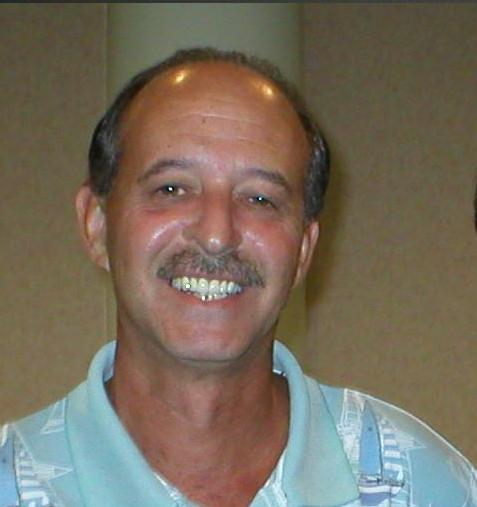
- Sigel at the 2003 US Open

Personal information
- Nicknames: "Captain Hook", "Mr. Finals"
- Born: 11 July 1953 (age 73) Rochester, New York, U.S.

Pool career
- Country: United States
- Turned pro: 1973

Tournament wins
- Other titles: 100
- World Champion: Straight Pool (1979, 1981, 1988)

Michael Sigel (born July 11, 1953) is an American professional pool player nicknamed "Captain Hook". He earned the nickname from his ability to hook his opponents with safety plays. Sigel was dominant during the 1980s in 9-Ball and Straight Pool and has a high run of 339 balls in Straight Pool. He is widely considered one of the greatest pool players of all time. In the year 2000, he was voted "Greatest Living Player of the Century" by Billiards Digest Magazine.

== Early life ==
Sigel is Jewish, and was born in Rochester, New York. His mother Ruth was aggravated with him at times, because as she said "he wouldn't go to Hebrew school because he was too tired from playing pool nights."

== Professional career ==
Sigel has won over 100 professional pool tournaments in his career, making him one of the most successful players of all time, winning multiple major titles in Straight pool and Nine-ball. Including 3 World Straight Pool Championship titles, 3 U.S. Open Nine-ball Championship titles and the BCA U.S. Open Straight Pool Championship.

Sigel turned pro in 1973 at the age of 21 years old. A few years later, Sigel continued the reputation as one of the best 9-Ball players in the country.

By 1986, Sigel had won 63 out of the 68 professional tournament finals he had reached, earning himself the nickname, "Mr. Finals".

He played himself in the movie Baltimore Bullet in 1980. He was also the technical advisor, instructor, and sports choreographer for most of the shots made by Paul Newman and Tom Cruise in the Academy Award-winning film The Color of Money in 1986. Sigel was a dominant player in the 1980s and has been on the cover of numerous trade magazines such as Billiards Digest, Pool and Billiards, InsidePOOL, Billiard News, and Bike Week. He has been featured in Sports Illustrated, Life, People, NY Times, Wall Street Journal, USA Today, Playboy, Parade, Baltimore Magazine, Orlando Sentinel, Silver Screen, and Cigar Aficionado.

Sigel was named "Player of the Year" three times in 1981, 1983 and 1986 by Billiards Digest and Pool and Billiards Magazine.

In 2005, Sigel won the IPT 8-ball Exhibition Match, between him and Loree Jon Jones. The victory earned him $150,000. That same year, he was seeded in the final of the King of the Hill Eight-ball Shootout, the next event of the IPT. There he met Efren Reyes, who played his way through the tournament. In the match, Reyes defeated him and took home $200,000 and Sigel got $100,000 for second place.

== Accolades ==
Sigel won the largest first place prize in a pool tournament at the time on three occasions, winning $25,000 in 1979, $30,000 in 1981 and $40,000 in 1986. The only player to equal this feat since in the modern era is Efren Reyes.

In 1987, Sigel became the first player to earn over $100,000 in prize winnings in single year on the pro tour. In 1989, He became the youngest male to be inducted into the Billiard Congress of America Hall of Fame, at the age of 35. In 1994, Sigel won the Super Billiards Expo Players Championship to win his 100th professional tournament, at the age of 41, before retiring from the tour.

== Titles and achievements ==
- 1974 U.S. Masters 9-Ball Championship
- 1975 U.S. Masters 9-Ball Championship
- 1976 Miami Open 9-Ball
- 1976 Southeastern Open 9-Ball
- 1976 Brunswick Open 9-Ball
- 1976 U.S. Open 9-Ball Championship
- 1976 Oregon Open 8-Ball
- 1977 Miami Open 8-Ball
- 1977 Dayton Open 9-Ball
- 1978 Billiard News National Open 14.1
- 1979 Maryland Open 9-ball
- 1979 Norfolk Open One Pocket
- 1979 PPPA World Straight Pool Championship
- 1980 Piedmont Open 9-ball
- 1980 Rocky Mountain Open 9-ball
- 1980 World Series of Pool
- 1980 U.S. Open 9-Ball Championship
- 1981 Caesars Tahoe Billiard Classic
- 1981 Southeastern Open 9-Ball
- 1981 PPPA World Straight Pool Championship
- 1981 Billiards Digest Player of the Year
- 1982 Music City Open 9-ball
- 1982 Denver Open 9-ball
- 1982 Australian 8-Ball Invitational
- 1983 Southeastern Open 9-ball
- 1983 Caesars Boardwalk Billiard Classic
- 1983 Rocky Mountain Open 9-ball
- 1983 Buffalo All-Around Shoot Out
- 1983 U.S. Open 9-Ball Championship
- 1983 Clyde Childress Memorial 9-Ball Open
- 1983 National Billiard News Player of the Year
- 1984 Wolfpack Open 9-Ball
- 1984 North Carolina Open 9-Ball
- 1984 Tar Heel Open 9-Ball
- 1985 Florida Open 9-Ball
- 1985 Glass City Open 9-Ball
- 1985 Spring Open 9-Ball
- 1985 Sands Regency 9-Ball Open
- 1985 Niagara Falls 14.1 Championship
- 1986 Glass City Open 9-Ball
- 1986 B.C. Open 9-Ball Championship
- 1986 Sands Regency 9-Ball Open
- 1986 Busch Open 9-ball
- 1986 Akron Open 9-Ball
- 1986 Resorts International Last Call For 9-Ball
- 1986 Moline Open 9-Ball
- 1986 Billiards Digest Player of the Year
- 1987 Florida Open 9-Ball
- 1987 Corner Pocket Classic
- 1987 Peter Vitalie 9-Ball Invitational
- 1987 Classic Cup VI 9-ball
- 1987 Rak'M Up Classic 9-Ball
- 1987 Brunswick 9-Ball Team Challenge - with (Ewa Mataya)
- 1988 King of the Rings Mixed Doubles - with (LoreeJon Ogonowski-Brown)
- 1988 Swedish Open 9-Ball
- 1988 PBA World Straight Pool Championship
- 1988 Sands Regency 9-Ball Open
- 1989 B.C. Open 9-Ball Championship
- 1989 Sands Regency 9-Ball Open
- 1989 Billiard Congress of America Hall of Fame
- 1991 South Philly Billiards One Pocket
- 1991 Classic Invitational 14.1 Championship
- 1991 Billiards Digest Best Straight Pool Player
- 1992 Pete Fusco One Pocket Tournament
- 1992 Bicycle Club 9-Ball Invitational
- 1992 BCA U.S. Open Straight Pool Championship
- 1993 McDermott National 9-Ball Tour Stop
- 1994 Super Billiards Expo Players Championship
- 1994 Baystate 9-Ball Shootout Championship
- 1998 French Open 9-Ball
- 1999 Billiards Digest Greatest Living Player of the Century
- 2003 Senior Masters 9-Ball Championship
- 2005 IPT 8-ball Exhibition Match vs. (Loree Jon Jones)
- 2011 International Jewish Sports Hall of Fame

== Filmography ==
- 1980 The Baltimore Bullet
- 1986 Color of Money (technical advisor)
- 1987 Mike Sigel's Winning Edge on Pocket Billiards
- 2000 The Art of Billiards
