= International Pool Tour =

Former sports tour for pocket billiards

IPT Logo

The International Pool Tour was a professional sports tour created in 2005 by Kevin Trudeau and hosted by Rebecca Grant. It aimed to elevate pool to the level of other modern sports. Closely modeled on the PGA Tour, the IPT offered the largest prize funds in pool history in its first year. The tour attracted the top pool players in the world. It differed from the many nine-ball tournaments, as all IPT events were eight-ball matches. The company was based in Hinsdale, Illinois.

Many pool enthusiasts were initially skeptical, but the first event was successful, and at the time was the biggest tournament in billiards history. However, by the end of 2006, the tour was in serious financial trouble, and was forced to stop staging major tournaments.

== Events ==
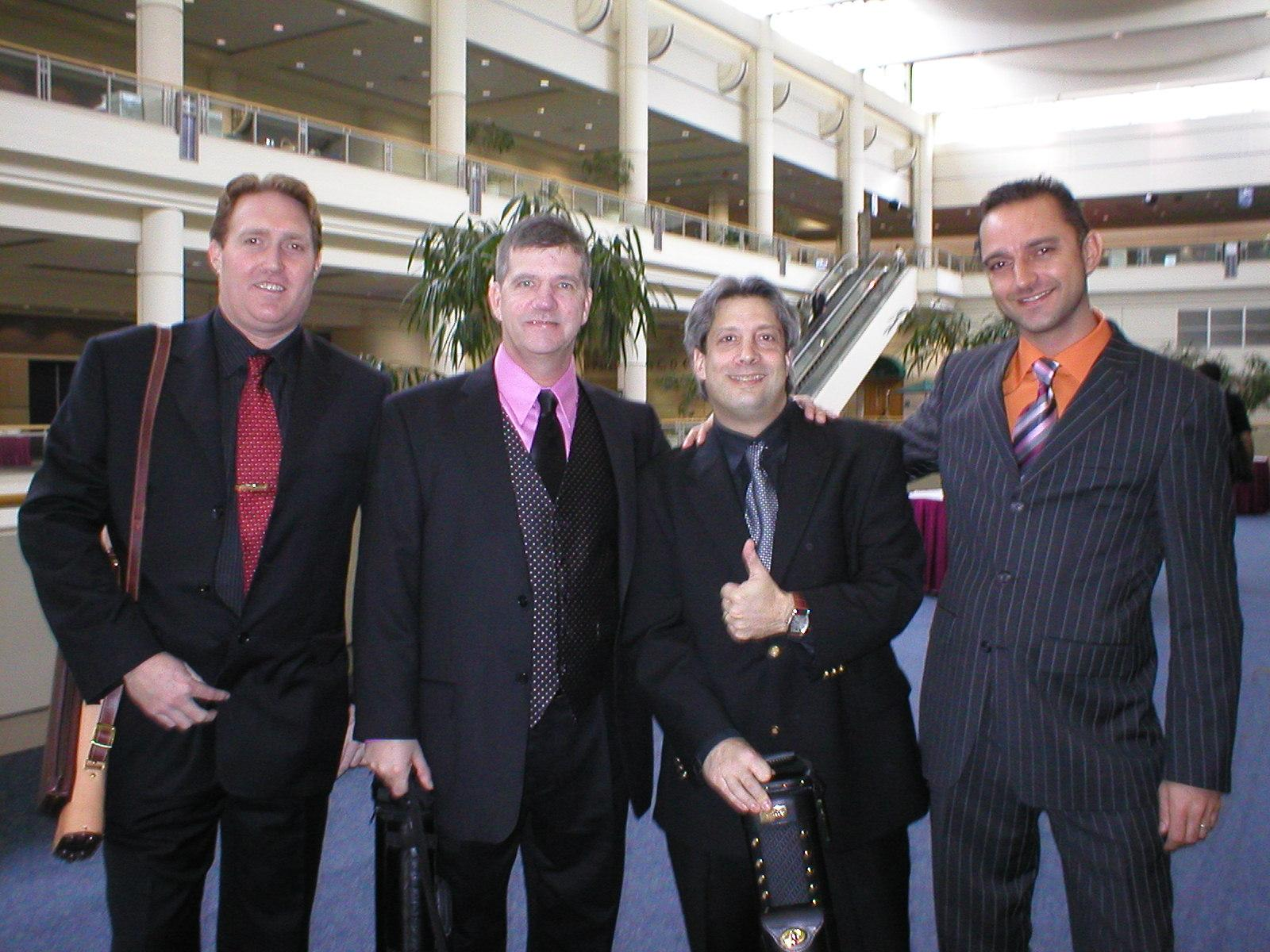
IPT Tour Members Colin Colenso, Keith McCready, Bernie Friend, and Stefan Santl at the IPT King of the Hill Shootout in Orlando, Florida, December 2005 adhering to Trudeau's mandatory dress code

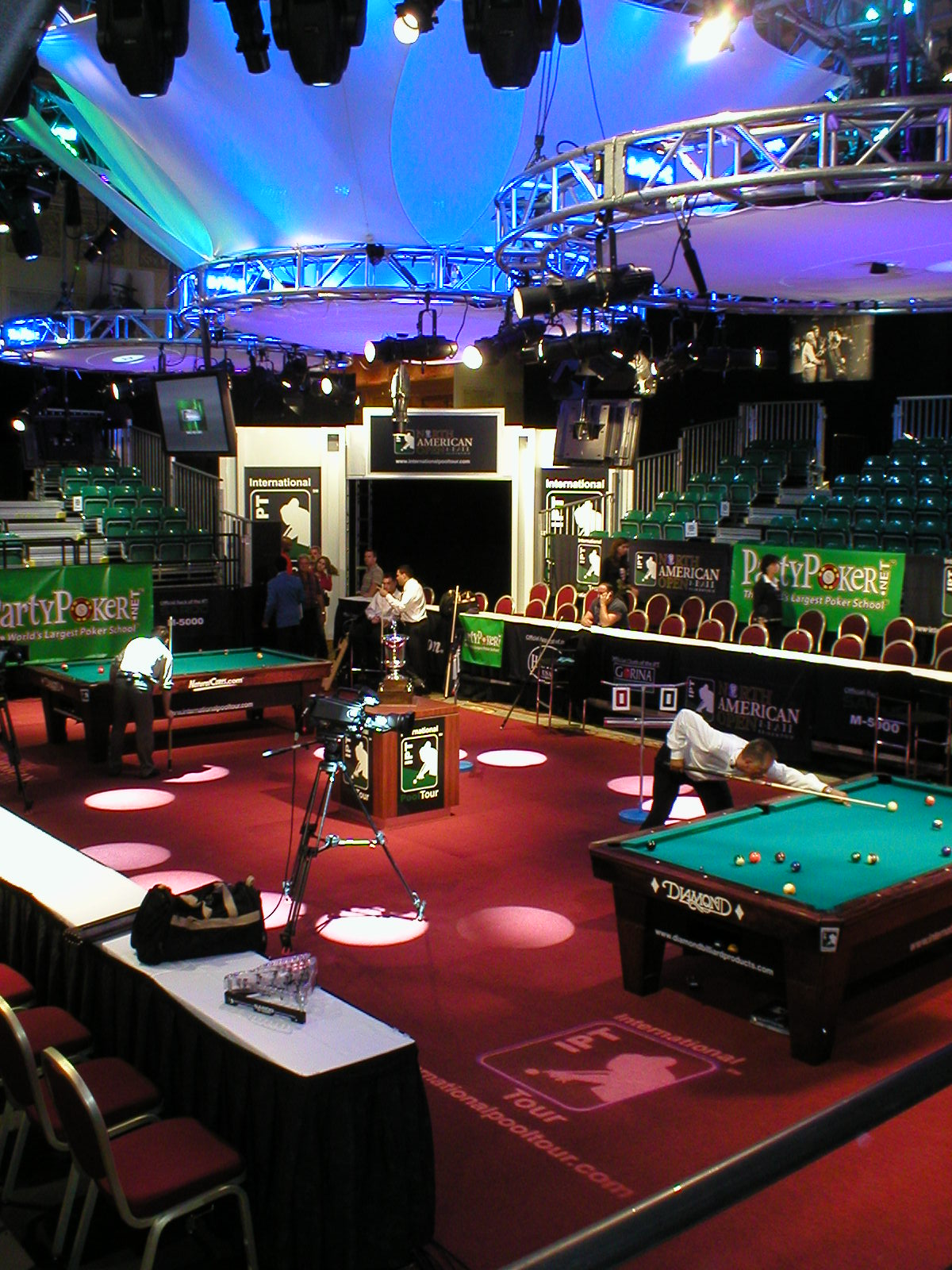
IPT Starship Stage at North American Open held in Las Vegas, July 2006, for TV rounds and Finals

- The first IPT event was held at Mandalay Bay in Las Vegas, Nevada. It was an exhibition match between Mike Sigel and LoreeJon Jones in 2005. For their participation, Sigel (winner) won $150,000 and Jones (loser) won $75,000. The prize money drew attention due to the fact that these payouts for an exhibition match were bigger than winning prizes from major championships.
- IPT King of the Hill 8-Ball Shootout- December 2005: an invitational event at the Orlando Convention Center in Orlando, Florida, consisting of 42 players who competed in a round-robin format. BCA Hall of Famers in attendance received $30,000 just for showing up. Efren Reyes defeated Sigel in the finals and pocketed $200,000. All of the 165 matches were filmed and were later available for sale as DVDs. The total prize money paid out was $1,125,000, which made it the biggest pool event in history. Select matches from the tournament were turned into a weekly TV series that had a dedicated time slot, in prime time, on Versus (then OLN).
- IPT North American Open- 2006: the first full field IPT tournament consisting of 200 players from more than 40 countries. The North American Open paid out $2,000,000 in prize money, and was held at the Venetian, Las Vegas. The tournament was broadcast live in Europe for one week straight in prime time, a first for the billiards industry. Select matches from this event were turned into the second weekly TV series, in a dedicated time slot in prime time, on Versus (then OLN).
- IPT World Open- 2006: the second full field IPT tournament consisting of 200 players from more than 40 countries. The World Open advertised a $3,000,000 prize fund. The IPT offered live coverage of the tournament daily through streaming video. At the conclusion of the tournament, players were told that the prize checks were not on site and that they would be sent in the mail shortly. However, the IPT had run into major financial problems due to the lack of sponsorship and other failed financing options. Players and fans were outraged, but tour management insisted that players would be paid in full. Ultimately, the players were paid in full, but it took nine installments of 11% each to finally pay the players. The nine installments were paid over a 14-month period.

The IPT was not in a financial position to continue hosting large world-class events, so they shifted their strategy to live streaming matches that pitted the best players against each other. These professionally produced events started around the same time as the final payment installment was sent to the players from the World Open. The IPT cited these matches as promotional and their intent was to promote the sport and build up web traffic once again in order to deploy a new strategy.

- IPT Ultimate 8-Ball- Earl Strickland vs. Johnny Archer, December 19, 2007: two of the biggest names in professional pool played in a race to 15 of 8-ball. The event streamed for free and it was reported that it drew a large live audience. The winner (Archer) received a $5,000 cash prize, and Strickland received $1,000 for his efforts. IPT paid each player's expenses.
- IPT Ultimate 8-Ball- Corey Deuel vs. Francisco Bustamante, January 23, 2008: the second of the challenge matches was also streamed free and drew a large audience. The winner (Bustamante) was paid $5,000 plus expenses and the loser (Deuel) received $1,000 plus expenses for his performance.
- IPT Ultimate 8-Ball- Marlon Manalo vs. Rodney Morris, March 4, 2008: the third of the live challenge matches was streamed free and drew a very large audience. Manalo won $5,000 plus expenses for winning the match. Morris won $1,000 plus expenses for his performance. This match also marked the approximate launch of Rodney Morris's new energy drink "Extreme Focus," which is now being promoted globally.
- IPT Ultimate 14.1 Straight Pool, April 29, 2008: the IPT decided to feature an undercard match of 14.1 straight pool, which marked the first time the IPT ever played anything other than 8-ball. The match featured reigning World Champion Oliver Ortmann and John Schmidt who was arguably one of the best straight pool players in the world. Schmidt won the match and $3,000 plus expenses. Ortmann received $1,000 plus expenses for his performance.
- IPT Ultimate 8-Ball, April 29, 2008: the IPT chose to allow fan voting to determine the contestants of this 8-ball match. The crowd favorite was Efren Reyes. His opponent was a shock to the world as the fans responded to the call for help from teenager Austin Murphy, a gifted young player from California. Reyes easily won the match and $5,000 plus expenses. Murphy won $1,000 plus expenses for his performance.
- IPT Ultimate 14.1 Straight Pool, June 2008: John Schmidt won in his last victory the chance to defend his win against Hall of Fame legend Mike Sigel. Most fans agreed that Sigel was past his prime and posed no threat to Schmidt's mastery. Much to the surprise of the world, Sigel played nearly perfect pool and handled Schmidt, who was visibly impressed by Sigel's game. Sigel won $3,000 plus expenses, and Schmidt won $1,000 plus expenses for his performance.
- IPT Ultimate 8-Ball, June 2008: In this eight ball match, English player Karl Boyes was originally supposed to play Alex Pagulayan. At the last moment, Pagulayan's manager contacted the IPT to inform them that he had lost his passport and that he would not be able to attend. IPT management called Tony Robles and asked him to fill in for Pagulayan. Robles accepted and flew from New York to L.A. in the middle of the night in order to make it to the match on time. Robles played well and beat Boyes in a close match. Robles won $5,000 plus expenses, and Boyes won $1,000 plus expenses for his performance.

== Other information ==
In the era of pool champions like Willie Mosconi and Irving Crane, the standard dress code for professional pool saw players dressed in tuxedos when competing, but beginning in the 1970s, the dress code had relaxed in competition with contenders wearing sneakers, baseball caps, T-shirts, and blue jeans. Trudeau re-established a dress code for the IPT members and required all IPT members and competitors to adhere to it, to project a better image for pool. All male pool players were required to wear suits, long-sleeved shirts, and leather shoes.

In the events Trudeau refused to follow some of the rules normally required by pool's governing bodies, in particular the policy that all prize money be held in escrow. Despite this, both the Women's Professional Billiards Association and the U.S. Professional Pool Players Association allowed their players to join the IPT.

== Tournaments ==
Tournament	Date	Location	Winner	Prize for winner	Runner-up	Prize for runner-up	Final score
King of the Hill Eight-ball Shootout	30 November – 4 December 2005	Orlando, Florida	(Philippines) Efren Reyes	$200,000	(United States) Mike Sigel	$100,000	2–0 (sets)
North American Eight-ball Championship	22–30 July 2006	Las Vegas, Nevada	(Germany) Thorsten Hohmann	$350,000	(Philippines) Marlon Manalo	$99,000	8-7
IPT World Open Eight-ball Championship	3–9 September 2006	Reno, Nevada	(Philippines) Efren Reyes (2)	$500,000	(United States) Rodney Morris	$150,000	8–6

== Demise ==
In September 2006, just prior to the IPT World Open Eight-ball Championship in Reno, Nevada, Kevin Trudeau announced that the IPT had entered into an agreement to be acquired by Ho Interactive, a new company started by casino owner billionaire Stanley Ho, a deal which failed. Two new sponsors were also announced offsetting the bad news that the IPT championship scheduled for October 2006 in London, England, had been cancelled and subsequently Trudeau announcing the IPT Tour was being sold due to lack of funding.
