= The Baltimore Bullet =

1980 film by Robert Ellis Miller

- original film poster
- Directed by: Robert Ellis Miller
- Written by: John Brascia, Robert Vincent O'Neil
- Produced by: John Brascia
- Starring: James Coburn; Omar Sharif; Bruce Boxleitner; Ronee Blakley
- Cinematography: James Crabe
- Edited by: Jerry Brady
- Music by: Johnny Mandel
- Production company: Filmfair Communications
- Distributed by: AVCO Embassy Pictures
- Release date: April 1, 1980
- Running time: 103 minutes
- Country: United States
- Language: English

The Baltimore Bullet is a 1980 American comedy film based on the adventures of two pool hustlers in the United States.

It was directed by Robert Ellis Miller and starred James Coburn, Omar Sharif, Bruce Boxleitner and Ronee Blakley. The screenplay was written by film and stage dancer John Brascia, from a story by Brascia and Robert Vincent O'Neil. Brascia also produced the film. It was one of Coburn's last starring roles.

Various real-life notable professional players made cameo appearances, including Lou Butera, Willie Mosconi, Steve Mizerak, Mike Sigel and Jimmy Mataya.

As of January 2009, the film has been released on (now out-of-print) NTSC VHS video tape, and a Region-2 (European, PAL-format) DVD, but is not presently available in other DVD regions.

== Plot ==
Nick Casey, whose nickname is the "Baltimore Bullet," is a legendary pool player whose best days are behind him. He decides to teach everything he knows to a young up-and-comer, Billie Joe Robbins, all leading up to a big winner-take-all match between Nick and The Deacon (Omar Sharif's character).

== Cast ==
Castlist is shown as follows.

- James Coburn as Nick "The Baltimore Bullet" Casey
- Omar Sharif as "The Deacon"
- Bruce Boxleitner as Billie Joe Robbins
- Ronee Blakley as Carolina Red
- Jack O'Halloran as Max
- Calvin Lockhart as "Snow" White
- Cisse Cameron as Sugar
- Michael Lerner as Paulie
- Rockne Tarkington as Gunner
- Robert Hewes as Ricco
- Shepherd Sanders as Robin Hood
- Paul Barselou as Cosmo
- Lou Wagner as Savannah Shorty
- Shay Duffin as Big Al
- Willie Mosconi as himself
- Peter Jason as Bert
- Eric Laneuville as Purvis
- T. J. Castronovo as Ernie
- Ed Bakey as Skinny
- Charlie Picerni as The Dealer
- George Fisher as Cardplayer
- Walter Wyatt as Blindman Joe
- John Alderman as Bookie
