= Willie Mosconi =

American pool player (1913–1993)

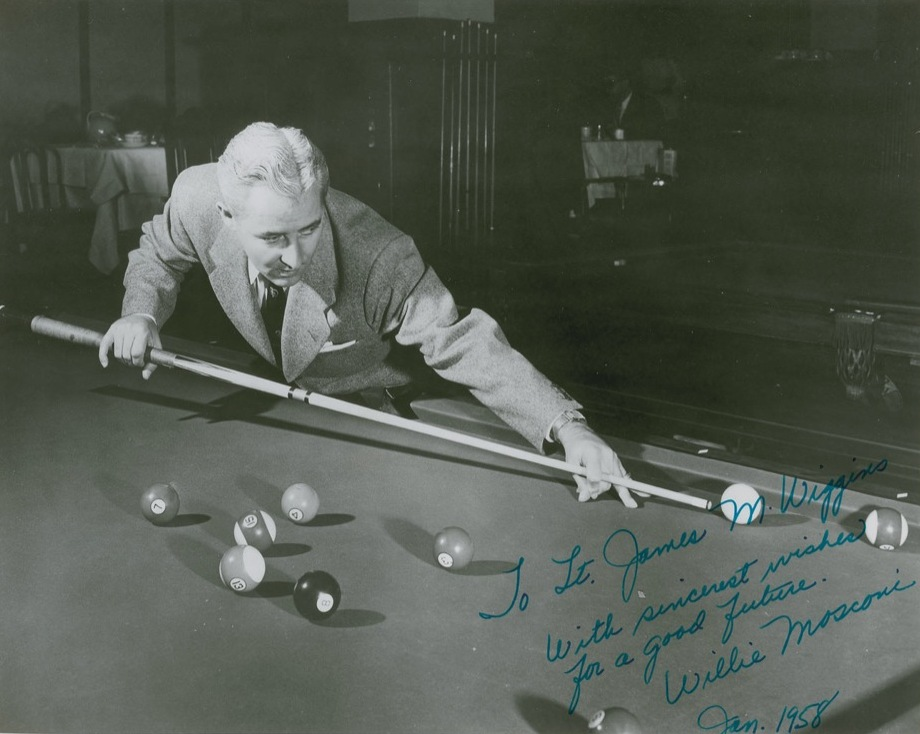
- Photo with autograph by Mosconi, signed January 1958

Personal information
- Nickname: "Mr. Pocket Billiards"
- Born: June 27, 1913 Philadelphia, Pennsylvania, U.S.
- Died: September 17, 1993 (aged 80) Haddon Heights, New Jersey, U.S.

Pool career
- Country: United States

Tournament wins
- World Champion: Straight Pool 19×

William Joseph Mosconi (/mɒˈskoʊni/; June 27, 1913 – September 17, 1993) was an American professional pool player from Philadelphia, Pennsylvania. Mosconi is widely considered one of the greatest pool players of all time. Between the years of 1941 and 1957, he won the World Straight Pool Championship nineteen times. For most of the 20th century, his name was essentially synonymous with pool in North America – he was nicknamed "Mr. Pocket Billiards" – and he was among the first Billiard Congress of America Hall of Fame inductees. Mosconi pioneered and regularly employed numerous trick shots, set many records, and helped to popularize pool as a national recreation activity.

During the 1940s and 1950s, the pocket billiards game most often played in competition was called straight pool, or 14.1 continuous, a form of pool considered by most top players to be more difficult than today's fast tournament game nine-ball. Mosconi set the officially-recognized straight pool high run world record of 526 consecutive balls in 1954.

== Early life ==
Mosconi's family lived above a pool hall that William's father, Joseph Mosconi, owned. Despite that, Joseph was strongly opposed to his son playing pocket billiards, preferring he become a vaudeville performer like his cousins, the dancers Charles and Louis Mosconi. He tried to keep his young son away from the game by hiding the billiard balls, but Willie improvised by practicing with an old broomstick and small potatoes from his mother's kitchen.

The young Mosconi was a prodigy and his father soon realized that he could use his son's talent to help earn money for their growing family. Joseph Mosconi began advertising challenge matches, and though Willie had to stand on a box in order to reach the table, he beat experienced players many years his senior.

== Tournaments and exhibitions ==
In 1919, an exhibition match was arranged between six-year-old Mosconi and the reigning World Champion, Ralph Greenleaf. The hall was packed, and though Greenleaf won that match, Mosconi played well enough to draw considerable attention and launch his professional career.

In 1922, Mosconi played eleven-year-old Ruth McGinnis in a Philadelphia pool hall exhibition match, though the contest was stopped by police as local laws prohibited minors from being in pool halls.

In 1924, at the age of 11, Mosconi was the juvenile straight pool champion and was regularly holding trick shot exhibitions. By the early 1930s, Mosconi had taken a brief hiatus from the game, but returned a few years later in the hopes of earning some money.

Upon his return, Mosconi entered one local tournament after another and according to his autobiography, "Willie's Game", he won them all. After a short while, Mosconi was making a living as a professional pool player. Willie claimed he never hustled anyone, beating everyone honestly: "I played everyone straight".

In 1933, Mosconi competed in the Billiard Congress of America (BCA) World Straight Pool Championship. Erwin Rudolph won the title and Willie came in 5th place.

His performance garnered the attention of the president of Brunswick Corporation who immediately hired the young phenom. That same year, Mosconi embarked on a hectic cross-country exhibition tour promoting Brunswick products. Mosconi was joined by his idol and then World Champion Ralph Greenleaf, who was at the top of his game. In the end the scoreline read 57 wins for Greenleaf and a close 50 for the 20-year-old Mosconi.

From 1940 to 1941, a round-robin tournament series was sponsored by billiard halls, with eight invitational players. Mosconi was sponsored by a hall in New York City called McGirr's. He dominated this series, and ran 125 balls from the break five times, being one of the first players to achieve this feat at the time.

In 1944, Mosconi enlisted in the United States Army, having already spent several years working within the defense industry. When World War II ended, he returned to a successful tournament career and renewed his affiliation with Brunswick.

After suffering a stroke in 1956, Mosconi slowed down on his tournament appearances in order to recover. In 1958 Mosconi made a return and won the National Invitational Tournament defeating Jimmy Moore.

Mosconi, c. 1962

Mosconi retired from tournament play in 1966, after once again making it to the final of the World Straight Pool Championship but losing to Joe Balsis. He remained active in promoting the game and consulted and appeared in several movies dealing with billiards, made game show appearances and wrote many articles on billiards, as well as co-authored some books. A feud with pool hustler Rudolf "Minnesota Fats" Wanderone (concocted mainly by Wanderone himself) kept Mosconi in the spotlight well into the 1970s and 1980s.

In 1974, Mosconi competed against Rex Williams in a challenge match, where both players competed in snooker and in various pocket billiards games in a 17-day competition, to conclude the winner. The 60 year old Mosconi won the challenge, winning 7 out of the 18 games in snooker, while dominating in straight pool, nine-ball, eight-ball, one-pocket, and bank pool. Mosconi earned $15,000 for winning the challenge match, which was the largest first place prize in cue sports at the time.

== As an author ==
Mosconi authored an autobiography titled Willie's Game, published in 1993.

He and a ghost writer authored an instructional book on pocket billiards entitled Willie Mosconi on Pocket Billiards. In the book he offers advice on fundamentals, includes photographs and diagrams on shotmaking and provides straight pool strategies. The book was published originally [number 121 in the Little Sports Library series] by Ziff-Davis Publishing Company of Chicago & New York in July 1948. It was reissued by Crown Publishers of New York in 1959. A second ghost-written book (which on some finer points contradicts On Pocket Billiards) was also published under his name.

== 526 high run ==
Mosconi set the world record by running 526 consecutive balls without a miss during a straight pool exhibition in Springfield, Ohio, on March 19–20, 1954. A handwritten and notarized affidavit with the signatures of more than 35 eyewitnesses exists as proof of this feat. The record has been surpassed, with 626 consecutive balls run by John Schmidt on May 27, 2019, recorded on a videotape. Critics have argued that Mosconi's record was made in competition, while Schmidt simply set up break shots for himself, and that his video was never released. In similar fashion to Schmidt, on January 18, 2022, as part of the "Legends of Pocket Billiards" high run series, Jayson Shaw completed a 51-rack record-breaking run of 714; however, after review of the unedited video by a BCA committee of 5 people it was noted that on the 45th ball, Jayson Shaw inadvertently touched an object ball. The outing was certified as a run of 669.

Mosconi's record was set on a 4×8-foot Brunswick table with 5 1/4-inch corner pockets at the East High Billiard Club. Schmidt's run was on a 4 1/2×9-foot table, which is more difficult in the sense that longer shots are required, but which is easier to play on in the sense that there is more room for the balls to spread, creating unfettered shots. Mosconi competed successfully on 4 1/2×9-foot and even 5×10-foot tables.

== The Hustler (1961) ==
Mosconi was the technical advisor on the 1961 film The Hustler, starring Paul Newman, Jackie Gleason, George C. Scott, and Piper Laurie. The movie played a major part in the boom in the popularity of pool. Mosconi's job was to teach Newman how to walk, talk, and shoot like a real pool hustler. Newman had never even picked up a pool cue before filming, but Mosconi's instruction helped to hide Newman's inexperience. According to Mosconi, Gleason was already skilled at billiards, and Mosconi recommended Gleason for the role of the original "Minnesota Fats".

Mosconi also had a cameo role as himself, acting as a stakes holder during the first match-up between the film's characters "Fast Eddie" Felson and "Minnesota Fats". Gleason can be heard saying "Willie, hang on to that" when the match commences. At various points in the extended scene, Mosconi can be seen in the audience watching the match.

Mosconi also had a cameo role as himself in George Thorogood's official video for his song "Bad to the Bone".

== Filmography ==
1937: Super Cue Men, a short feature starring Mosconi, Jimmy Caras and Joi Lansing.

1945: Columbia World of Sports: "Champion of the Cue", an eight-minute "sports reel" in which Mosconi demonstrates his cueing expertise in slow motion.

1953: Columbia World of Sports: "Billiard and Bowling Champs", another short documentary starring Willie Mosconi and carom billiards great Willie Hoppe (as well as bowlers), once again in slow motion.

1950–57: Mosconi appeared on Toast of the Town later known as The Ed Sullivan Show on April 23, 1950, and January 6, 1952,

September 25, 1961: Theatrical release of The Hustler (see above).

February 5, 1962: Mosconi was a contestant on the television game show I've Got a Secret.

September 2, 1962: Mosconi was a contestant on the television game show What's My Line?.

1966: An episode of Get Smart, "The Dead Spy Scrawls" {1/18}, featured actor Harry Bartell in the role of "Willie Marconi," trying to teach Maxwell Smart how to play pool. While some have erroneously believed this is a cameo of Willie Mosconi playing himself, the Marconi character is a fictitious but obvious tribute to Mosconi, who is acknowledged by The Chief as "the greatest pool player in the world."

February 25, 1978: "The Great Pool Shoot-Out", a US$15,000 match between Rudolf "Minnesota Fats" Wanderone Jr. and Mosconi at the Waldorf-Astoria Hotel in New York City. Mosconi won all three sets of the competition, which included nine-ball, eight-ball, and rotation, 5–2, 5–3 and 5–2 respectively. Aired on ABC's Wide World of Sports with commentator Howard Cosell and referee Charles Ursitti.

Throughout the 1970s and 1980s: Mosconi made several other television appearances competing in challenge matches with other legends such as Jimmy Caras, Luther Lassiter, Irving Crane, Joe Balsis and "Fats" Wanderone. Many of these shows aired on ABC and the fledgling ESPN network.

May 9, 1980: Mosconi played a sportscaster in the film The Baltimore Bullet starring James Coburn and Omar Sharif.

1982: He appeared in the music video for George Thorogood's "Bad to the Bone", as a spectator and betting on Bo Diddley's character.

October 1984:In the Resorts International Shoot-Out—Mosconi lost to his rival "Minnesota Fats" Wanderone.

August 10, 1991: Mosconi played his last challenge match, against Jimmy Caras at the Valley Billiards Hall of Fame tribute dinner show. The event was hosted by billiard artists the Birkbeck Twins at the Williamson Restaurant in Horsham, Pennsylvania. Both players were stopped every couple of racks for interviews.

His story was also featured in an episode of Mysteries at the Museum.

== Legacy ==
In 1968, at the age of 55, Mosconi was inducted into the Billiard Congress of America Hall of Fame.

In 1994, the Mosconi Cup, an annual pool competition between American and European players, was founded in his honor. The event has been held every year since then.

In 2006, Mosconi was posthumously honored with membership in the Philadelphia Sports Hall of Fame.

== Titles & achievements ==
- 1941 BAA World Straight Pool Championship
- 1942 BAA World Straight Pool Championship
- 1944 BAA World Straight Pool Championship
- 1945 BAA World Straight Pool Championship
- 1946 BAA World Straight Pool Championship
- 1946 BAA World Straight Pool Championship
- 1947 BAA World Straight Pool Championship
- 1947 BAA World Straight Pool Championship
- 1948 BCA World Straight Pool Championship
- 1950 BCA World Straight Pool Championship
- 1951 BCA World Straight Pool Championship
- 1951 BCA World Straight Pool Championship
- 1952 BCA World Straight Pool Championship
- 1953 BCA World Straight Pool Championship
- 1953 14.1 Record High Run. 322 Consecutive Balls
- 1953 14.1 Record High Run. 355 Consecutive Balls
- 1953 14.1 Record High Run. 365 Consecutive Balls
- 1954 BCA World Straight Pool Championship
- 1954 14.1 Record High Run. 526 Consecutive Balls
- 1955 BCA World Straight Pool Championship
- 1956 BCA World Straight Pool Championship
- 1956 BCA World Straight Pool Championship
- 1956 BCA World Straight Pool Championship
- 1958 National Straight Pool Invitational Tournament
- 1968 Billiard Congress of America Hall of Fame
- 1974 Snooker-Pool Challenge Match vs. (Rex Williams)
- 1978 ABC Sports Pool Challenge Match vs. (Minnesota Fats)
- 1982 ESPN Legends of Pocket Billiards Tournament
- 2006 Philadelphia Sports Hall of Fame
- 2026 Best in Billiards 250 years- Best Straight Pool Player Award

== Personal life ==
Shortly before winning his first World Straight Pool Championship in 1941, Mosconi married Ann Harrison, his first wife. Shortly thereafter the first of his three children was born, William Jr., who attended St. Joseph's Prep in Philadelphia and graduated with the class of 1959. Willie's and Ann's daughter, Candace, followed soon after William Jr. The marriage ended in divorce.

Mosconi married his second wife, Flora Marchini, in 1953. Their daughter Gloria was born in 1954. Flora remained married to Willie until his death in 1993.

== Death ==
Willie Mosconi died of a heart attack on September 17, 1993, at his home in Haddon Heights, New Jersey. He is interred at New Saint Marys Cemetery, in Bellmawr, New Jersey.

== Notes ==
- Billiards: The Official Rules and Records Book 1992
- Billiard Digest, Vol 16, No. 2
- Keen, Cathy (June 5, 2002). "Willie Mosconi Papers, 1924–2000 #744". National Museum of American History. Smithsonian Institution. Archived from the original on February 6, 2008.
