= Straight pool =

Cue sport

- A traditional straight pool rack with the 1 and 5 balls at the bottom corners, and all other balls placed randomly
- Highest governing body: World Pool-Billiard Association
- First played: 1910

Characteristics
- Contact: No
- Team members: single competitors or doubles
- Mixed-sex: Yes
- Type: Indoor, table
- Equipment: Cue sports equipment
- Venue: Indoor, table

Presence
- Country or region: Worldwide

Straight pool, also called 14.1 continuous, is a cue sport in which two competing players attempt to pocket as many object balls as possible without playing a foul. The game was the primary version of pool played in professional competition until it was superseded by faster-playing games like nine-ball and eight-ball in the 1980s.

In straight pool, the player may call and attempt to pocket any object ball on the table regardless of its number or color until only one object ball and the cue ball remain, at which point the other fourteen balls are re-racked. At this point, play resumes with the objective of pocketing the remaining ball in a manner that causes the cue ball to carom into the rack, spreading out the balls and allowing the player to continue the run. The goal is to reach a set number of points that is determined by agreement before the game begins; traditionally 100 points is needed for a win, though professional matches may go higher. One point is scored by pocketing an object ball without a foul, while a point is deducted on a foul.

The game was most popular in the United States and was notably played in the 1961 film The Hustler. The World Straight Pool Championship was held from 1911 until 1990, and again from 2006 until 2019. The game is currently represented at a continental level in events such as the International Straight Pool Open and the European Pool Championships' straight pool event.

== History ==
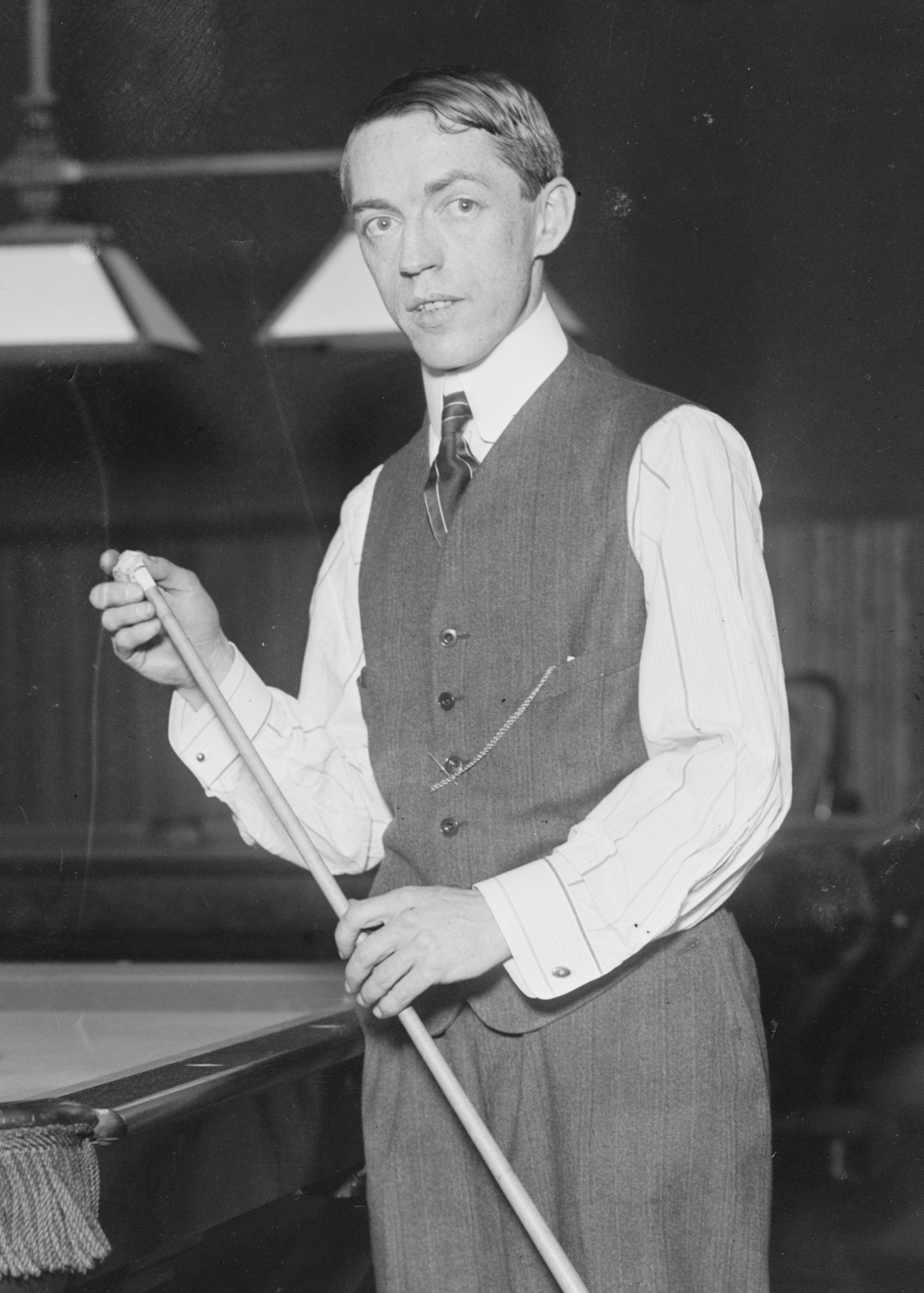
Jerome Keogh invented the game in 1910.

Straight pool is derived from an earlier game called continuous pool, in which points are earned for every ball that is pocketed. In this game, the last object ball is pocketed (not left on the table as in straight pool), and then racked with the rest of them when a new game begins (the player who pocketed the final ball plays the break shot in the new game). As players became skilled in scoring dozens of points in a single turn, they would often use defensive shots on the break to avoid their opponent pocketing the 15 balls on the table. Continuous pool was invented in 1889 and played professionally until 1911.

In 1910, Jerome Keogh, who won numerous continuous pool tournaments, wanted to increase the attacking nature from the break-off shot, and make it more plausible to perform multi-rack runs. He introduced the modern rule that the object balls are re-racked not when all have been pocketed but after 14 have been sunk and one remains on the table. This new game became known as "14.1 continuous" and "14.1 rack", and in 1912 it became known as straight pool. The first 14.1 professional championship was held in 1912 in Philadelphia. The game quickly overtook continuous pool in popularity and was the most-played version of pool until nine-ball and eight-ball became popular.

== Gameplay ==
In straight pool's first frame, the fifteen object balls are racked with the center of the apex ball placed over the foot spot. Traditionally the 1 ball is placed at the rack's right corner and the 5 ball is placed at the rack's left corner for visibility, though there is no such rule requirement. Other balls are placed at random and must touch adjacent balls.

Unlike most pool games, the object of straight pool's typical initial break shot (with all 15 object balls racked together) is to leave the opponent without the chance to pot a ball. All shots–including the break shot–in straight pool require nomination, in which both a ball and pocket are called before the shot is taken. Consequently, in the first break shot the racked balls are usually not struck with force in hopes of pocketing a ball (the odds of pocketing the called one are very low), but just hard enough to drive at least one ball to a cushion to avoid a foul, and ideally off the cushion and gently back into the pack of balls. This is a form safety. (Note: The break shot in straight pool is similar in manner to the break shot (British: break-off) in snooker, as the player also tries to leave a safety even though the game of snooker does not have a call-pocket rule.) Some shots, such as caroms and combinations, do not have to be called. On the break, either the cue ball and two other balls must touch a rail, or a ball must be pocketed. The failure to accomplish either of these conditions results in a foul. Fouling on the initial break incurs a penalty loss of two points. In addition, the opponent has the choice of either accepting the table in position or of having the balls re-racked and requiring the offending player to repeat the opening break. All other fouls made during the game incur a one-point deduction, and a player incurs an additional 15-point penalty for committing three consecutive fouls.

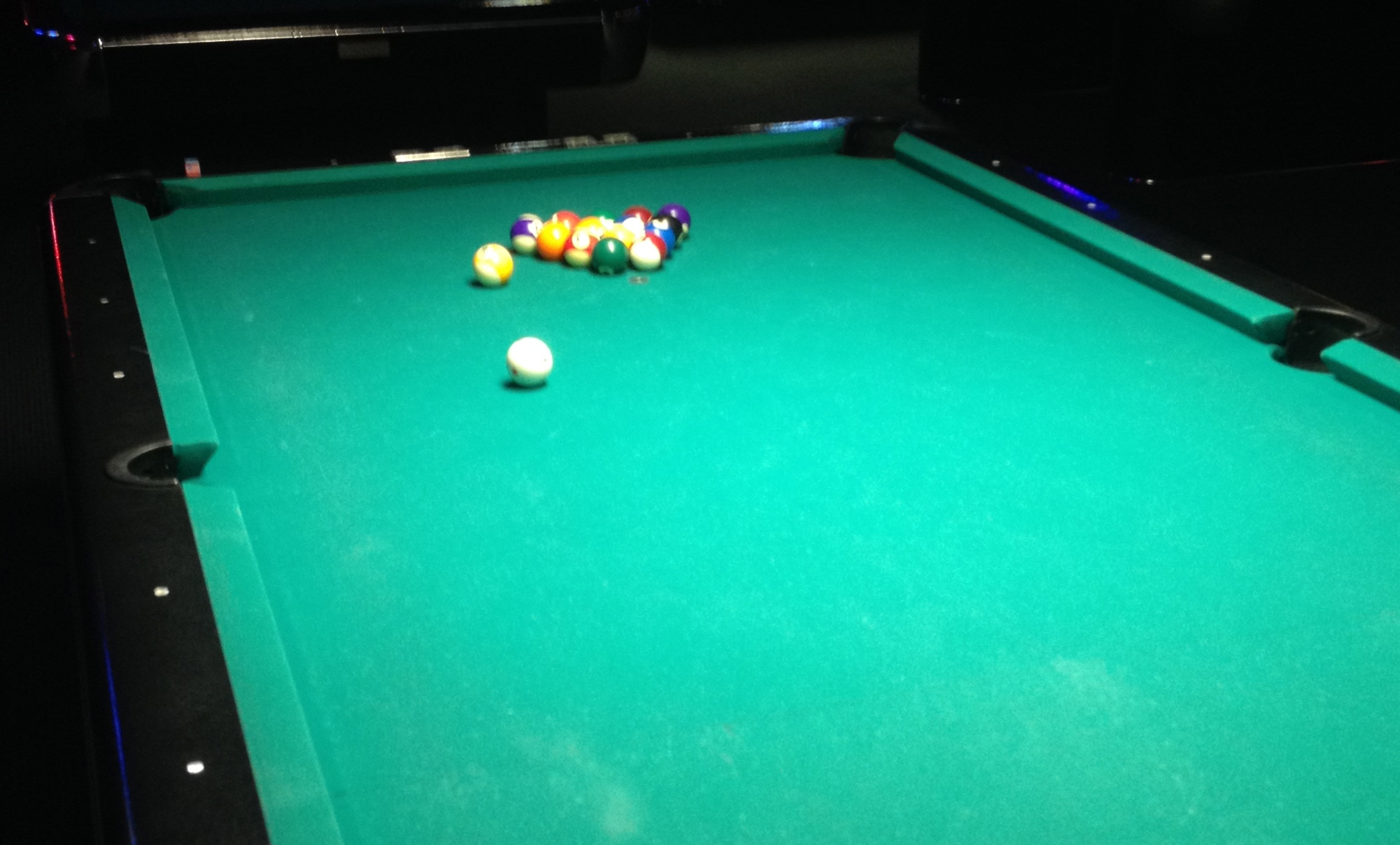
A typical layout for the intragame rack. An object ball is to the left of the racked balls.

The unique feature of straight pool is the racking that is played when one object ball remains. These intra-game racks have a specific set of rules; when the rack is supposed to be replaced, if neither the cue ball nor the object ball remain in the rack area, the balls are replaced with no ball at the apex. At this point, the aim is to pot the remaining ball and carom into the pack of balls, allowing a shot on the next ball to continue the run. Additional rules apply when either ball is in the position where the balls would usually be racked.

== Highest runs ==
In straight pool, skilled players can pot all of the balls in a single rack and continue to do so for large runs. On March 19, 1954, Willie Mosconi set a record-high run of 526 points over 36 racks. Mosconi had been playing a race-to-200-points match against an amateur player named Earl Bruney in Springfield, Ohio. Bruney scored the first three points in the match, but Mosconi ran the next 200 points to win. However, Mosconi continued the run for over two hours to score 526 before missing a fine cut shot. The run was witnessed by 300 people, including a lawyer who produced an affidavit to confirm it took place, and it was later confirmed by the Billiard Congress of America.

Mosconi's record for the highest documented run stood for over 65 years. It was finally beaten on May 27, 2019, when John Schmidt ran 626 balls in Monterey, California, which was the result of a sustained, months-long effort to break Mosconi's record. Critics have argued that Mosconi's record was made in competition while Schmidt simply set up break shots for himself. In a similar format as Schmidt's run, on January 18, 2022, as part of the "Legends of Pocket Billiards" high run series, where a number of player have attempted to beat the record, Jayson Shaw completed a record-breaking run of 669 balls. On January 6, 2025, this record was broken by Jayson Shaw again, with a new high-run of 832 balls.

== Tournaments and governance ==
Straight pool is governed by regional councils such as the European Pocket Billiard Federation, and at a worldwide level by the World Pool-Billiard Association. The World Straight Pool Championship was created in 1912 and ran sporadically until 1990. In 2006, the championship was revived, until again ending in 2010. A straight pool event has been played at the European Pool Championships annually since 1980. The U.S. Open Straight Pool Championship was sanctioned by the Billiard Congress of America (BCA) from 1966 to 2000; It was revived by CueSports International (CSI) for one year in 2007 and afterwards was held annually from 2016, until again ending in 2019.

The game has been in decline since the 1980s; players in the United States have often called straight pool "dead". Popularity of the game has been reduced due to the popularity of other pool games such as nine-ball and eight-ball, and a lack of straight pool competitions.

== In popular culture ==
Straight pool has been featured in popular culture, most notably in the 1959 novel The Hustler and its 1961 film adaptation. It also provides the setting and background for John O'Hara's monologue short story "Straight Pool".

Straight pool, in common with other pool games, has been associated with hustling. The Twilight Zone produced an episode titled "A Game of Pool" in 1961, and remade it in 1989, with a straight-pool player being revived from the afterlife to compete in one last match.

In the movie The Color of Money the character Eddie Felson (Paul Newman) says "Straight pool, you gotta be a real surgeon to get 'em, you know? It's all finesse."
