= Venom (disambiguation) =

Venom is a class of animal toxins.

Venom may also refer to:

== Arts and media ==
=== Comics ===
- Venom (character), a symbiotic alien-life form and former enemy of Spider-Man in the Marvel Comics universe
  - Eddie Brock, the first human host to use the name Venom and current host
  - Mac Gargan, the original Scorpion, the third Venom host and the second to use the name Venom
  - Flash Thompson, the fourth Venom host
  - Venom (comic book), several comic books
- Venomm, a different Marvel Comics character
- Venom, a fictional drug used by Bane in the DC Comics universe

=== Film ===
- Venom (1966 film) or Gift, a Danish film directed by Knud Leif Thomsen
- Venom (1971 film), a British horror film directed by Peter Sykes
- Venom (1981 film), a British thriller film directed by Piers Haggard
- Venom (2005 film), an American horror film directed by Jim Gillespie
- Venom (2018 film), an American film based on the Marvel Comics character
  - Venom: Let There Be Carnage, an American 2021 film sequel to the 2018 film
  - Venom: The Last Dance, an American 2024 film sequel to the 2018 and 2021 films
- Venom, a character in the 2011 film Zookeeper

=== Games ===
- Venom (game), a play-by-mail game
- Venom Games, a British video game developer
- Venom Snake, a character from the Metal Gear series
- Venom, a character from the Guilty Gear series
- Venom, home planet of Andross in the Star Fox video game series

=== Music ===
- Venom (band), a British heavy metal band formed in 1978
- Venom Inc., a British heavy metal band formed in 2015
- Venom (Awesome Snakes album) or the title song, 2006
- Venom (Bullet for My Valentine album) or the title song, 2015
- Venom (Chamillionaire album), unreleased
- Venom (U-God album) or the title song, 2018
- Venom (Wargasm album), 2023
- Venom (soundtrack), a soundtrack album from the 2018 film
- Venom, an album by Impellitteri, 2015

==== Songs ====
- "Venom" (Eminem song), 2018
- "Venom" (The Shermans song), 2009
- "Venom", by Bvndit, 2022
- "Venom", by Jesswar, 2021
- "Venom", by Kairiki Bear, 2020
- "Venom", by Little Simz, 2021
- "Venom", by Slayyyter from Troubled Paradise, 2021
- "Venom", by Stray Kids from Oddinary, 2022

=== Television ===
- "Venom", Danger Bay season 2, episode 10 (1986)
- "Venom", Law & Order season 9, episode 7 (1998)
- "Venom", Law & Order: Special Victims Unit season 7, episode 18 (2006)
- "Venom", Legend of the Dragon series 2, episode 20 (2006)
- "Venom: Part 1", Profiler season 1, episode 21 (1997)
- "Venom: Part 2", Profiler season 1, episode 22 (1997)
- "Venom", Project ARMS episode 24 (2001)
- "Venom", Spider-Man (2017) season 1, episode 14 (2017)
- "Venom", The Most Extreme season 2, episode 3 (2003)
- "Venom", Thunderbirds Are Go season 3, episode 23 (2020)
- "Venom", Ultimate Spider-Man season 1, episode 4 (2012)
- Venom, a character in the 2007 Philippine TV series Rounin
- Venom, a gladiator stage name in the 2008 TV series American Gladiators

=== Other uses in arts and media ===
- V.E.N.O.M. (Vicious Evil Network of Mayhem), a fictional organization in the M.A.S.K. media franchise
- Venom, a character in the 2007–2013 web series The Guild

== People ==
- Florian Kohler (born 1988), French trick shot pool player, also known as "Venom"
- Joey Abs or Jason Arhndt (born 1971), American professional wrestler who also performed as "Venom"

== Transportation ==
- Bell UH-1Y Venom, a utility helicopter
- Dodge Venom, a 1994 concept car
- de Havilland Venom, a jet fighter-bomber aircraft
- Hennessey Viper Venom 1000 Twin Turbo, a sports car
- Hennessey Venom GT, a sports car
- Hennessey Venom F5, a sports car
- HMS Venom, a list of ships
  - HMS Venom (1794), a Royal Navy gunbrig
- Vickers Venom, a fighter aircraft

== Other uses ==
- VENOM (Virtualized Environment Neglected Operations Manipulation), a computer security flaw that was publicly disclosed in 2015
- Nashville Venom, a defunct professional indoor football team, Tennessee, U.S.

== See also ==
- Venomous (disambiguation)
- Venon (disambiguation)
- Sea Venom (disambiguation)
- Steel Venom (disambiguation)
