= Florian Kohler =

French pool trick shot player

- Born: July 10, 1988 (age 38); France
- Other name: Venom
- Occupations: Professional artistic pool player, owner of Venom Trickshots Corp.
- Website: http://www.venomtrickshots.com/

Florian "Venom" Kohler (born July 10, 1988) is a French professional pool player trick shot artist, particularly known for his massé shots.

== Career ==
Growing up in eastern France, Kohler did not start playing pool until the age of 18, when he received a 6-foot pool table as a birthday gift from his parents. Kohler started watching exhibition videos online and trying to imitate shots in them. His influences include Mike Massey and Semih Sayginer.

He began experimenting with his own versions of trick shots, and eventually developed many new concepts, such as ball jumping, massé-ing with multiple cues simultaneously, executing jump and massé shots on moving balls, and executing very high jumps. He has set a record for highest jump shot on a moving ball, at 34 inches (86 centimeters).

Kohler assisted in the development of the Mezz massé cue, which is specially designed to execute trick shots.

The APA announced they would be sponsoring Florian Kohler and he would be an official spokesperson for the APA on April 28, 2014, at their Annual League Operator Convention in Las Vegas.

In mid-2019 Kohler and his wife became league operators for the APA Las Vegas Division.

Kohler currently holds 7 Guinness World Record titles:

1. Playing with the longest usable pool cue (17 ft 7.4 in)
2. Most pool balls potted into the middle pocket over an obstacle in 1 minute
3. Highest jump pot of a billiard ball
4. Fastest time to jump pot 15 pool balls on a US table
5. Fastest time to jump pot 15 pool balls (one-handed)
6. Longest duration to spin a billiard ball
7. Most pool balls jumped one-handed in 1 minute

The most pool balls potted into the middle pocket over an obstacle in one minute record was aired on the Guinness World Records Italian Show (Ep. 28) where he competed for the record against Stefano Pelinga. Stefano managed to pocket 35 balls in 1 minute and Kholer managed 68, setting a record. Kohler then went on to beat his own record of 68 by pocketing 70. On December 16, 2018, he broke his own record again at Las Vegas with 75 balls.

== Titles ==
- 2023 WPA World Artistic Pool Championship
- 2024 WPA World Artistic Pool Championship
- 2026 WPA World Artistic Pool Championship
