= Andy Segal =

American pool player

Personal information
- Nickname: "The Magic Man"
- Born: 14 April 1968 (age 58) Queens, New York, U.S.
- Website: AndySegal.com

Pool career
- Country: United States

Tournament wins
- World Champion: Artistic Pool (2007, 2011, 2012, 2013)

Andy Segal (born April 14, 1968), nicknamed "the Magic Man", is a trick-shot pool champion from Huntington, New York. He began as a professional nine-ball player in the 1990s, and was a regular on the Camel Pro Billiard Tour before switching to trick-shot competition in 2002. A full-time pro player since 2007, Segal holds four world records in artistic billiards. He is known for his television competition appearances on ESPN, and has won many such events, including Trick Shot Magic (2009, 2010 & 2014), the World Cup of Trick Shots (2006, 2008 & 2009), the WPA World Artistic Pool Championship (2007, 2011, 2012 & 2013), and the Masters Artistic Pool Championship (2005, 2007 & 2009). Segal also performs trick shot exhibitions all over the world, and in films and television.

== Early life ==
Andy Segal was born and raised in Queens, New York. He attended Stuyvesant High School in New York City. He was an active member of the debating team, and towards the end of his high school years, became interested in pool.

After high school, he attended Carnegie Mellon University, where he studied math and computer science. While there, he spent some time teaching at the University of Pittsburgh Billiards Club, where he met his girlfriend and future wife Kimberly Segal. On September 2, 1995, the two were married and less than four years later had their daughter Jessica. They moved to Huntington, where they currently reside.

Segal is also a sleight of hand magician, and trains weekly at mixed martial arts.

== Career ==
=== Computer programmer ===
In 1991, Segal graduated from university and went on to work in Wall Street in the IT department of Merrill Lynch. After about a year and a half, he started working for Sony Music, but then moved back into the financial world only one year later. Eventually he found himself back in Wall Street, working for Standard & Poor's. Segal was currently working there when the September 11 attacks occurred.

In 2005, Segal switched to a company closer to his home in Long Island, and started working for Adecco. He spent about two years there before he decided to go into pool full-time.

=== Professional pool player ===
While working full-time in the computer field, Segal spend his evenings and weekends playing pool at Amsterdam Billiards in New York City. A few of the top players were from that area, and he worked with and learned from two of them, Tony Robles and George "Ginky" San Souci. He was an active player on the Camel Pro Billiard Tour, playing eight-ball, nine-ball, and ten-ball. He was also a regular on the Tri-State Tour and the Joss Tour. During these tournaments, he would often perform for players and spectators, doing trick-shot exhibitions and magic. Segal also performed at private parties around the New York City area, and while working with Blatt Billiards, performed a public exhibition at Grand Central Terminal. He met the great trick shot artist Mike Massey, and by the early 2000s, Segal was concentrating more on trick shots than nine-ball.

In 2002, Segal began playing in formal trick-shot competition, after being invited to complete in the titular 2003 North American Artistic Pool Championship was held (in October 2002 due to scheduling issues) at Hippo's Billiards in Utica, New York; Segal finished 4th, but stayed in that cue sports discipline. That final-four finish earned him an invitation to the 2003 WPA World Artistic Pool Championships in Kyiv, Ukraine. At that competition, Segal finished 5th overall, and won the gold medal in the bank/kick discipline, and tied with Mike Massey for the gold in the jump discipline.

In September 2003, Polish trick-shot artist Bogdan Wołkowski injured his arm and had to drop out of the ESPN Trick Shot Magic tournament in Baltimore, Maryland. Six days before the event, Matt Braun, promoter and producer of that event, called Segal and asked if he could fill the open spot. Segal agreed, and spent those 6 days coming up with trick shots to use against the veterans like the then two-time world champion Mike Massey. Segal won his first-round match against Stefano Pelinga of Italy. He moved on to 2001 world champion Charles Darling from Missouri. That match ended in a tie breaker; this requires both players to shoot the cue ball in an eight-cushion and land on or near a $100 bill; the closest player to the bill wins. Segal won, landing the cue ball about an inch away. In the finals, he ran up against Mike Massey, who handed him his only defeat and a second-place finish, in Segal's first televised event.

Andy Segal's first major win came in 2004 at the Northeast Championship, held at Shooter's Billiards in Southington, Connecticut. Later that year, he won another 2004 Las Vegas Artistic Pool Championship (hosted in conjunction with the American Poolplayers Association's National Team Championship). He also won the 2005, 2007, and 2009 Masters Artistic Pool Championship, held at the Super Billiards Expo in King of Prussia, Pennsylvania; and four WPA World Trick Shot Champion titles (2007, 2011, 2012, 2013). His first World Title in 2007 was in St. Petersburg, Russia at the Lider Club. He beat Poland national champion Luke Szywala in the semi-finals and Argentina champion Sebastian Giumelli in the finals. In 2011, the World Championship was held in Valley Forge, Pennsylvania, where he beat Romanian Gabi Visoiu in the semi-finals and fellow American Jamey Gray in the finals. He successfully defended his title in 2012 when he beat Canadian Nick Nikolaidis for his third world title.

Throughout his trick shot career, the one title that eluded him was Trick Shot Magic. In 2009, at the ESPN Zone at New York New York Casino in Las Vegas, Andy Segal captured that one as well, defeating Sebastian Giumelli from Argentina, a repeat of the 2007 World Championships. He then went on to defend his title in 2010 at the Green Valley Ranch Casino in Henderson, Nevada, against former world champion Jamey Gray.

In 2006, he was invited to play in the first World Cup of Trick Shots, which matched up the best from the United States with the best from Europe. This event films every year in October at Mohegan Sun Casino in Connecticut. Segal has been the captain of Team USA for several years.

Segal is also the operator of New Jersey's Hudson County Pool League, a local franchise of the amateur American Poolplayers Association.

Segal holds four world records and has won over 50 trick shot discipline titles.

=== Television and film ===
Throughout his pool/billiard career, Andy Segal has worked in the television and film industry. He has done trick shots for various commercials, including AT&T, All detergent, and a 12-week teaser series with Krysta Ayne on Spike TV called "Bikini Pool Shark". In 2007, he booked a spot performing trick shots on Good Morning America with Chris Cuomo, He also worked as the pool-related technical advisor on the 2009 film Sweet and Lowdown, starring Woody Allen, Sean Penn, and Uma Thurman. Segal was featured in National Geographic Channel's Amazing, and a documentary titled Spin Doctors: The Wondrous World of Artistic Pool filmed in 3D by Comcast at the 2011 WPA World Championship.

In 2011, Segal joined the Screen Actors Guild, and has appeared in one film, Sascha Baron Cohen's The Dictator, and several television shows: Pan Am, Person of Interest, Damages, and Boardwalk Empire. He has also appeared on Good Morning America to perform artistic pool tricks, in December 2007.

He has filmed over 60 pool and trick-shot instructional videos for HowCast.com, and more than 30 more for MonkeySee.com.

== Titles and achievements ==
- 2013 WPA World Artistic Pool Championship
- 2012 WPA World Artistic Pool Championship
- 2011 WPA World Artistic Pool Championship
- 2011 Duel of Champions
- 2011 Las Vegas Ultimate Trick Shot Tour
- 2010 Southeast Classic Championship
- 2010 Trick Shot Magic Championship
- 2009 World Cup of Trick Shots Championship
- 2009 Trick Shot Magic Championship
- 2009 Las Vegas Ultimate Trick Shot Tour Championship
- 2009 Masters Trick Shot Championship
- 2008 World Cup of Trick Shots Championship
- 2008 Dr. Cue Artistic Cup Championship
- 2007 WPA World Artistic Pool Championship
- 2007 Masters Trick Shot Champion
- 2006 World Cup of Trick Shots Championship
- 2005 Comet Classic Championship
- 2005 Masters Trick Shot Championship
- 2004 Las Vegas Open Championship
- 2004 Northeastern Open Championship
