= Magic Man (disambiguation) =

"Magic Man" is a 1975 song by Heart.

Magic Man or The Magic Man may also refer to:

== Arts and entertainment ==
- “Magic Man”, a 1969 song by progressive rock band Caravan from the self-titled album Caravan.
- The Magic Man, a 1974 Chicago musical that starred illusionist David Copperfield
- Magic Man, an antagonist from the 1998 video game Mega Man & Bass
- Magic Man, a character from the animated series Adventure Time
- Magic Man (film), a 2010 film directed by Stuart Cooper
- Magic Man (band), an American two-piece electronic band
- "Magic Man" (Better Call Saul), a television episode
- Magic Man (Jackson Wang album), 2022
- "Magic Man", a 2022 electro swing song by Balduin and Wolfgang Lohr, featuring J. Fitz

== People with the nickname ==
- Magic Johnson (born 1959), American businessman and former professional basketball player
- Pavel Datsyuk (born 1978), Russian professional ice hockey player
- Paulie Malignaggi (born 1980), American retired professional boxer; also the title of a film about Malignaggi
- Kent Nilsson (born 1956), Swedish retired professional ice hockey player
- Andy Segal (born 1968), American trick-shot pool champion
- Jakub Moder (born 1999), Polish professional footballer
