= The Snap Magazine =

The Snap Magazine (originally titled Make It On the Snap, and not to be confused with several later magazines using the word "Snap" in their titles) is an American pool (pocket billiards) periodical that was published in the late 1980s and early 1990s. The magazine has been described in various venues as "the best of all pool publications" (BilliardMemorabilia.com) and "among the best billiard publications ever" (Billiard Scoop).

== Character ==
The Snap Magazine set many precedents in the world of billiard journalism. In addition to articles on never-before-covered aspects of the billiard world, the magazine featured profiles of formerly secretive hustlers and up-and-coming players (many of whom went on to become top pros), hard-hitting opinion pieces, humorous hustling and gambling stories, original photography, cartoons, billiard fiction, reports on hundreds of billiard tournaments from local to international, and controversial guest editorials. It also included instruction columns on all types of billiard play, including snooker, one-pocket, straight pool, nine-ball, eight-ball and other popular games.

== History ==
Originally planned as a newsletter for the fledgling organization Southeastern Network of Amateur Pool Players (SNAPP), excitement surrounding the publication generated so many requests for advertising before the first issue was published that the publishers decided to discard the newsletter format in favor of a full-fledged, slick magazine.

Founders Rick Boling and "Kreole" Freddie Yates put together the first bi-monthly issue of Make It On the Snap in the summer of 1989 in Tallahassee, Florida, operating at "OTS Publications, a division of Billiard Enterprises of Florida", and it was an immediate success. The first issue featured Grady "the Professor" Mathews and Buddy "the Rifleman" Hall, as well as various other contributors. Traveling to pool tournaments and popular pool halls around the Southeast, representatives of the magazine began selling subscriptions, wholesale distribution packages and advertising, while the publishers worked on adding to the editorial staff and gathering stories from the field. By the time the second issue (October/November 1989) was published, a staff of professional editors, writers and contributors had been assembled, complemented by a group of advisors including such pool luminaries as Benny "The Goose" Conway, Ray "Cool Cat" Martin, Mike Massey, David Howard, Floyd Baxter, and Gene "The Glove" Catron.

The magazine grew and prospered until, in its second year, a series of unexpected financial reversals caused it to cease publication in December, 1991.

== Covers and title ==
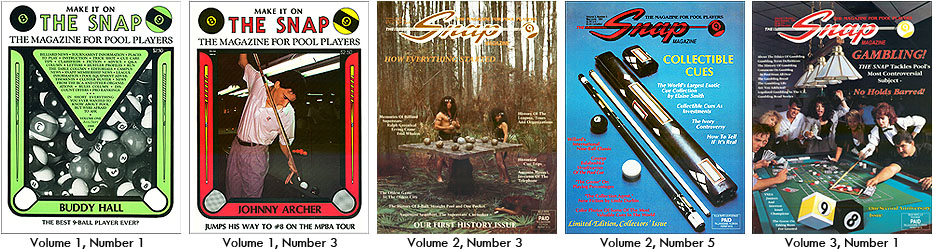

By the end of its first year of publication, the editors realized they had erred in starting off with an odd-months issue, so they took the opportunity to rectify this and also to redesign the cover and rename the magazine. The cover of the first issue of the second year carried a new and sleeker logo featuring the shortened name The Snap Magazine. While covers of earlier issues centered on photos of well-known and up-and-coming players, with the new design the publishers also initiated a policy of creating humorous and/or historically significant covers. These covers, many of which became famous among billiard aficionados, included such staged scenes as: a Neanderthal couple playing pool on a stone table using rocks for balls (history issue); a grizzled lobsterman checking his catch of 9-balls in an authentic lobster trap (New England issue); and a group of yuppie gamblers playing at a pool/craps table with 9-ball and 8-ball dice and a croupier using a modified cue stick to rake in the chips (gambling issue). Two of the most famous covers were for the Johnston City and collectible cues issues. On the former, rare photos of the famous "Pit" at Johnston City and a well-preserved copy of a Johnston City program appeared. The latter featured a photo of one of the rarest billiard cue-and-case combinations, with a cue built by master cue builder Gus Szamboti and a matching case by Fellini.

The magazine's title is based on the pool jargon phrase "on the snap", a reference to instantly winning a game of nine-ball by pocketing the money ball on the break shot or "snap".

== Concept ==
With a subtitle of "The Magazine for Pool Players," the editorial concept of the magazine was to feature as many players as possible in its pages, while offering expert instruction, advice and commentary geared toward the average pool player. In fact, the publishers were so intent on including as much content as possible, a typical issue often contained two to three times the word count of the other billiard magazines of the day. The publishing of so many names of average players and covering their tournament and other activities, endeared the magazine to thousands around the country, and word of mouth caused circulation to soar.

== Content ==
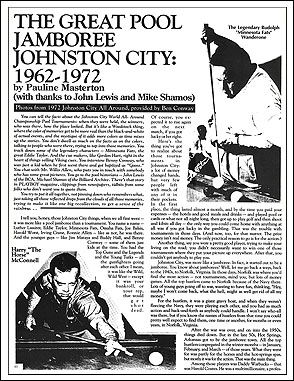
Example article, on the famous Johnston City tournaments.

The eclectic magazine's content ranged from humorous tidbits and trivia, to ground-breaking articles on such taboo subjects as hustlers and gambling. "Billy's Briefs", a column of short news stories, was billed as "a compilation of news, rumors, outright lies and miscellany", while "On The Road With 'Kreole' Freddie" concentrated on regional pool stories from the co-founder's extensive travels to various pool venues and tournaments. "Cue Tips" offered helpful ideas on cue care and repair, and "Senior Snapshots" reported on pool and billiard activities among seniors around the country. Other columns focused on the medical and health aspects of tournament play, snooker, billiards history, player and pool room profiles, pool at colleges and universities, equipment innovations, and humorous and/or poignant pool stories.

Features ran the gamut from interviews with famous players and hustlers, to in-depth reports on gambling in the sport, major tournaments, regional reports, historical incidents, famous tournaments, pool cue builders, the development of regional tours, up-and-coming players, and famous historical billiard figures. Several of the issues concentrated on regions, such as Texas, California, New England and Florida.

The magazine also set a precedent by publishing pool fiction, with stories from professional fiction writers, real-life hustlers and average players. Scattered throughout each issue were tidbits of billiard trivia, humorous road stories, cartoons, quotes from well-known billiard figures, obituaries, and other short features.

== Humor ==
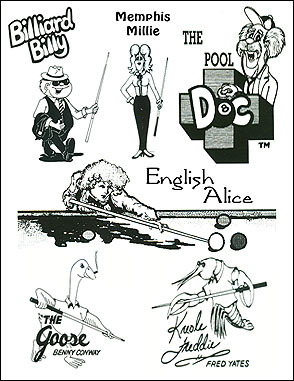
The magazine's cartoon mascots and caricatures.

Another unique aspect of the editorial and graphic concept was humor. Led by its four cartoon Mascots, Billiard Billy, Memphis Millie, the Pool Doc, drawn by art director Thomas Pagels; and English Alice, drawn by international and history editor Pauline Masterton, the magazine published humorous news columns, cartoons, rants, bar games & puzzles, and fiction. "The Hustler" column featured first-hand stories about real-life pool hustlers, often containing humorous gambling stories and relating the harsh reality of life on the road. In addition to its mascots, the magazine's two major editorial contributors, "Kreole" Freddy Yates, and Benny "The Goose" Conway, were represented by cartoon characters (an anthropomorphic, pool-playing crayfish and goose, respectively), also drawn by Pagels. Sprinkled throughout its pages were quips, quotes and humorous stories written by well-known hustlers and other billiard figures. And, in another break from traditional billiard magazines, poetry on the subject of pool was published. The magazine's cavalier and humorous tone was a breath of fresh air in the mostly stolid, conservative world of billiard journalism at the time.

== Editors and staff ==
Neither of the magazine's founders had experience in periodical publishing, circulation or promotion, so they had to rapidly put together a group of experienced professionals to handle all the aspects of the enterprise with which they were not familiar. Most of these were friends of the founders, willing to take a shot on the upstart publication and work for no pay. And, luckily, among these friends were several with exactly the right talents and expertise to round out the core staff of editors and advisors. Over the years this staff was increased to include several billiard experts, industry figures, marketing specialists, and artists. The initial core staff, however, remained intact for the entire duration of the magazine's existence. They included editor-in-chief Rick Boling, senior editor Elaine Smith, international and history editor Pauline Masterton, art director Thomas Pagels, and technical and instruction editor Benny Conway.

== Merchandise ==
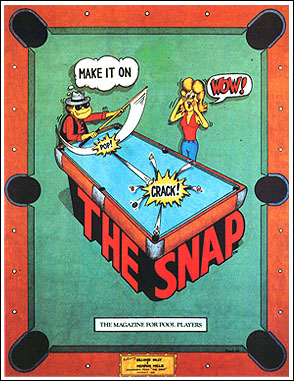
Poster featuring Billiard Billy and Memphis Millie.

The popularity of The Snap generated in some players and patrons an emotional loyalty seldom seen in the world of billiard journalism, a fact that eventually led to the development of a line of T-shirts and other promotional products. Featuring the magazine's popular cartoon mascots, these items were designed by staff artist Tom Pagels, and were so popular that he was commissioned to hand-paint two full-color posters, one featuring Billiard Billy and Memphis Millie, and the other featuring the Pool Doc. The posters were an instant hit, and eventually came to grace the walls of many a pool room and private game room. In addition, noting an unfilled need in the industry, the editors later developed a line of tournament supplies, including such items as laminated cards for conducting random draws at the beginning of tournaments; pads of signup sheets; scoring materials; rule cards; instruction books; disposable flow charts; and most popular of all, large, erasable, permanent, wall-mounted flow charts.

== Legacy ==
Articles from The Snap, especially those by billiards luminaries, are still being republished today. From its inception to its demise, copies of The Snap were coveted by players and billiard industry figures alike. Long before the magazine went out of business, back issues had become collector's items, selling for many times the original cover price. Copies of the first issue were in such demand that the magazine was inspired to publish a reprint of it. The reprint was limited to 1,000 copies, and each copy was numbered to distinguish it from the originals. Some years after the magazine folded, a flooding incident at the storage facility where the remnants of the business were stored destroyed hundreds of back issues, posters and other merchandise, thereby increasing in rarity all remaining Snap Magazine memorabilia. Today, some individual issues demand up to $150 a copy, and complete sets of all thirteen issues sell for as much as $1,500 on the Internet.
