= Bogdan Wołkowski =

Polish billiards trick-shot artist and entertainer

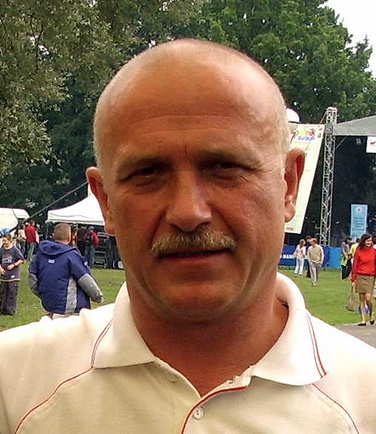

Personal information
- Nickname: The Wizard
- Born: 1957 (age 68–69) Jaworzno

Sport
- Country: Poland
- Sport: Snooker

Tournament wins
- World Championship: Snooker Trickshot (1999, 2000, 2001, 2002, 2003, 2004)

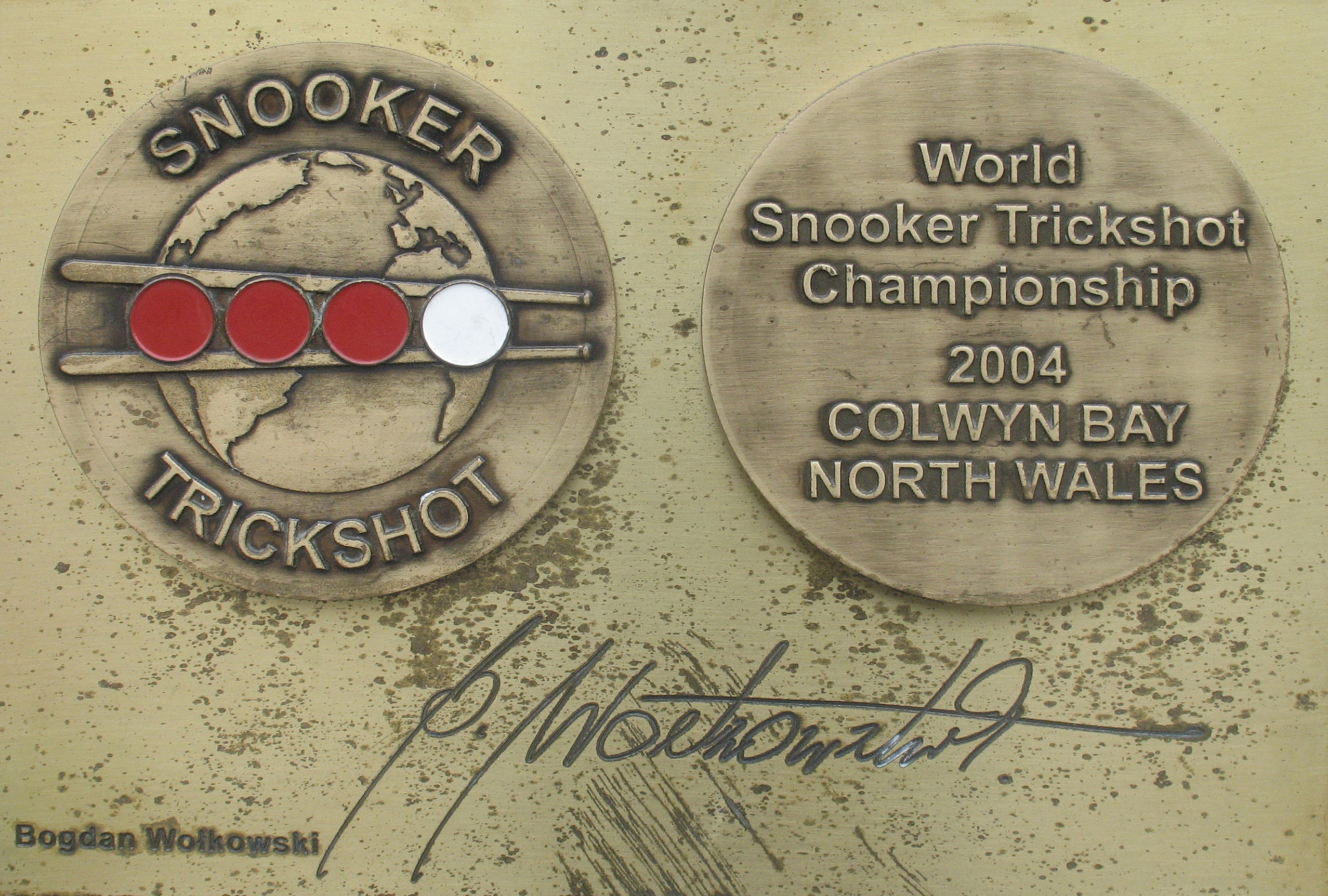
Copy of B. Wołkowski medal and autograph in Avenue Sport Stars in Dziwnów

Bogdan Wołkowski (born 1957 in Jaworzno, Poland), nicknamed "The Wizard", is a Polish professional billiards and snooker trick-shot artist and entertainer, who has won many World Trick Shot Championships.

== Titles and achievements ==
- 1997 Slovakian Pool Trick Shot Championship
- 1998 World Pool Masters Trick Shot Challenge
- 1999 World Pool Masters Trick Shot Challenge
- 1999 World Snooker Trick Shot Championship
- 2000 World Pool Masters Trick Shot Challenge
- 2000 World Snooker Trick Shot Championship
- 2001 World Snooker Trick Shot Championship
- 2002 World Snooker Trick Shot Championship
- 2002 European Pool Billiard Artistic Championship
- 2003 World Snooker Trick Shot Championship
- 2004 World Snooker Trick Shot Championship
- 2008 World Pool Masters Trick Shot Challenge
