= Grady Mathews =

American pool player (1943–2012)

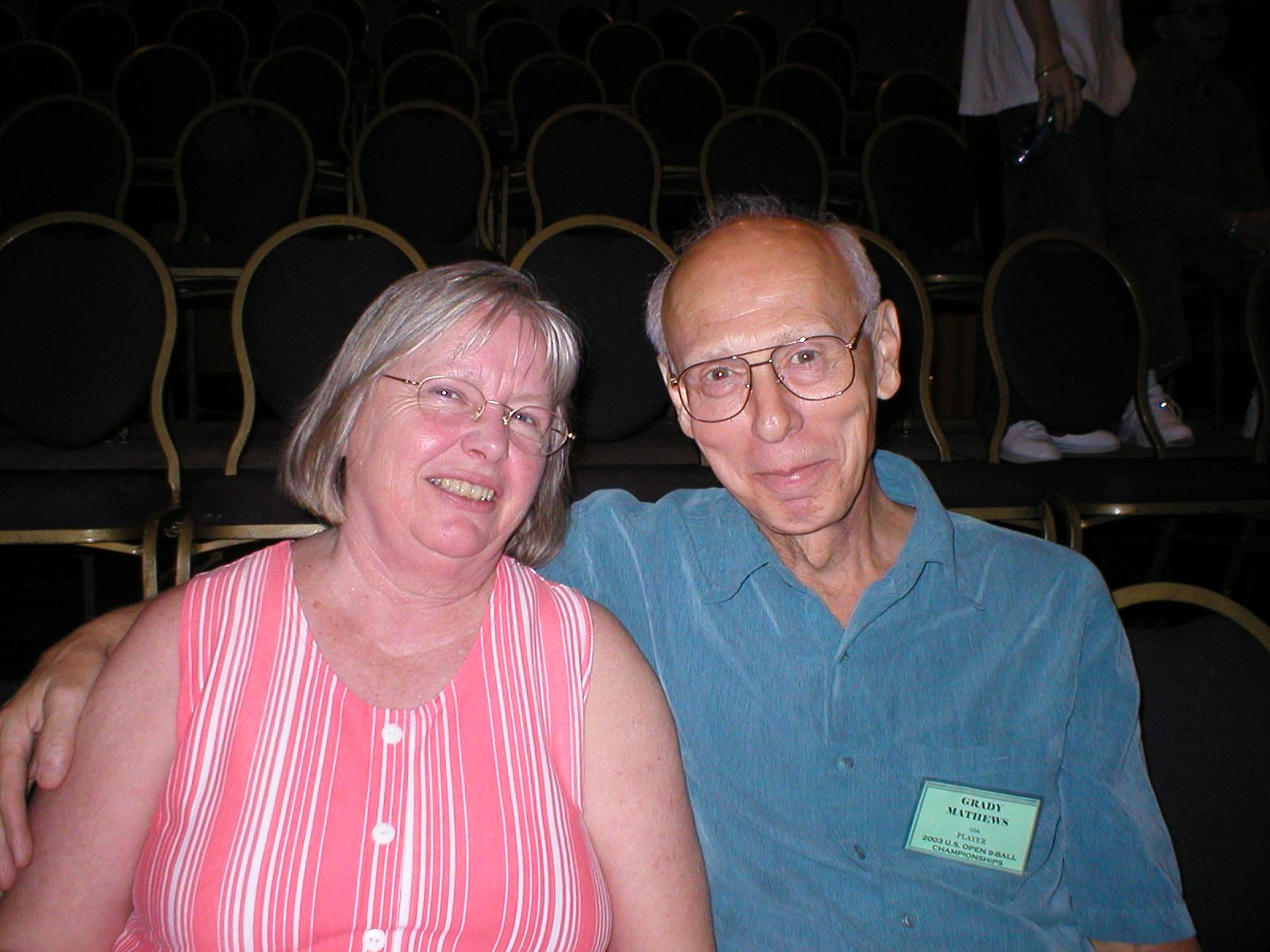
Randi and Grady Mathews

Grady Mathews (January 3, 1943 in San Antonio, Texas – April 18, 2012), also known as "the Professor" or "Mr. One Pocket", was an American pool player and was the first inductee into the One-Pocket Hall of Fame, in 2004.

Mathews promoted pool throughout his career, particularly the game of one-pocket. He was the creator of the Legends of One-Pocket tournament series and promoter of many other tournaments. In addition to success at the table, he has been a technical advisor to movie producers, a regular commentator on pool matches taped by Accu-Stats Video Productions, a producer of billiard instructional video tapes, and a pool journalist and author. He was also a notable instructor and coach.

He lived in Columbia, South Carolina and managed his pool room, Grady's Billiards. Mathews continued to compete professionally, as well as putting on exhibitions, pool clinics, and private lessons throughout the United States until he was diagnosed with cancer in 2011. He died April 18, 2012, and is survived by two children.

== Early life ==
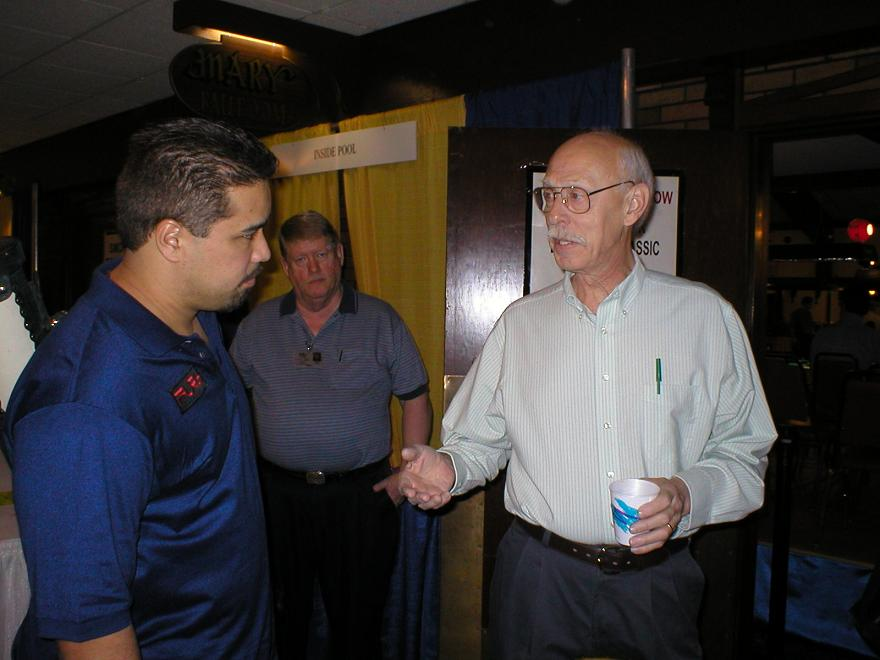
American Pool Champion Rodney Morris in consultation with Mathews at the 2003 Derby City Classic in Louisville, Kentucky

Mathews took up pool in the late 1950s while living in California. When he was 14 years old in San Mateo, Mathews began playing pool at a local bowling alley. When he reached 18, he commuted to nearby San Francisco to watch great pool players of this era, claiming it was very important to watch the game being played by those who know how. He took his game on the road in the 1960s and graduated to become a top player in straight pool, nine-ball, one-pocket, and bank pool. Straight pool was the game played in most American tournaments before the 1960s, but when television broadcast came to the fore, the shorter game of nine-ball replaced straight pool, and a professional player was required to play all games to survive. The era of straight pool played with clay or mud balls on 5-by-10 tables was replaced by the 4½-by-9's and the plastic balls that are commonly used today.

== Professional career ==
At the 1984 Busch Open Nine-Ball at Miller Time Billiards in Moline, Illinois, Mathews captured the first-place prize monies as well as a Brunswick Gold Crown pool table, defeating Howard Vickery in the finals.

Over his 30-year career, Mathews captured several titles in different disciplines of the game, although he is best known for his success in one-pocket.

In December 2005, Grady Mathews competed in the International Pool Tour King of the Hill Shootout in Orlando, Florida, an invitational event consisting of 43 pool players with accomplishments in the discipline of pocket billiards, and was a member of the International Pool Tour.

== Titles & achievements ==
- 1981 Montana Open 9-Ball
- 1983 Houston Red's Open One Pocket
- 1984 North Carolina Open 9-Ball
- 1984 Austin One Pocket Championship
- 1984 River City Open One Pocket
- 1984 Busch Open 9-ball
- 1985 Cleveland Open 14.1
- 1985 Houston Red's Open One-pocket
- 1985 Motor City Open 9-Ball
- 1990 Granite State Open 14.1
- 1995 Legends of One Pocket Championship
- 1996 Taco Bell Seniors 9-Ball Championship
- 2004 One Pocket Hall of Fame

== Filmography ==
In 1986, Mathews played the character "Dud" with Paul Newman and Tom Cruise in Martin Scorsese's Academy Award-winning film The Color of Money, loosely based on the novel by Walter Tevis (the sequel to The Hustler).

== Promotion ==
Mathews promoted and produced the following pool tournaments:

- 1983 All Around Pocket Billiards Championship (Tampa, Florida)
- 1985 Motor City Nine-Ball Open (Detroit, Michigan)
- 1991 Legends of One-Pocket Championship (Columbia, South Carolina)
- 1991 Legends of One-Pocket Championship (Philadelphia, Pennsylvania)
- 1993 Legends of One-Pocket Championship (Reno, Nevada)
- 1994 Legends of One-Pocket Championship (Philadelphia, Pennsylvania)
- 1995 Maine Event 14.1 Championship (Portland, Maine)
- 1995 Legends of One-Pocket Championship (Olathe, Kansas)
- 1995 Back Pocket Nine-Ball Open (Hampton, Virginia)
- 1998 Legends of One-Pocket Championship (Baton Rouge, Louisiana)
- 1999 Seniors Nine-ball Championship (Portland, Maine)
- 2000 Legends of One-Pocket Championship (Portland, Maine)
- 2003 Legends of One-Pocket Championship
- 2003 Legends of Straight Pool Championship (Columbia, SC)
- 2003 Seniors Nine-ball Championship (Naples, Florida)
- 2004 Gulf Coast Classic (Gulfport, Mississippi)

Mathews is also well known for his work as a commentator on numerous matches recorded by Accu-Stats Video Productions, and has produced many of his own instructional videos providing strategies for the game of One Pocket. Up until his death, he wrote a monthly instruction column for InsidePOOL Magazine and has been a contributing writer to other pool periodicals such as Billiards Digest, 1984–1987, The Snap Magazine, 1989–1991, and The National Billiard News.
