= Trick shot =

Type of billiards shot

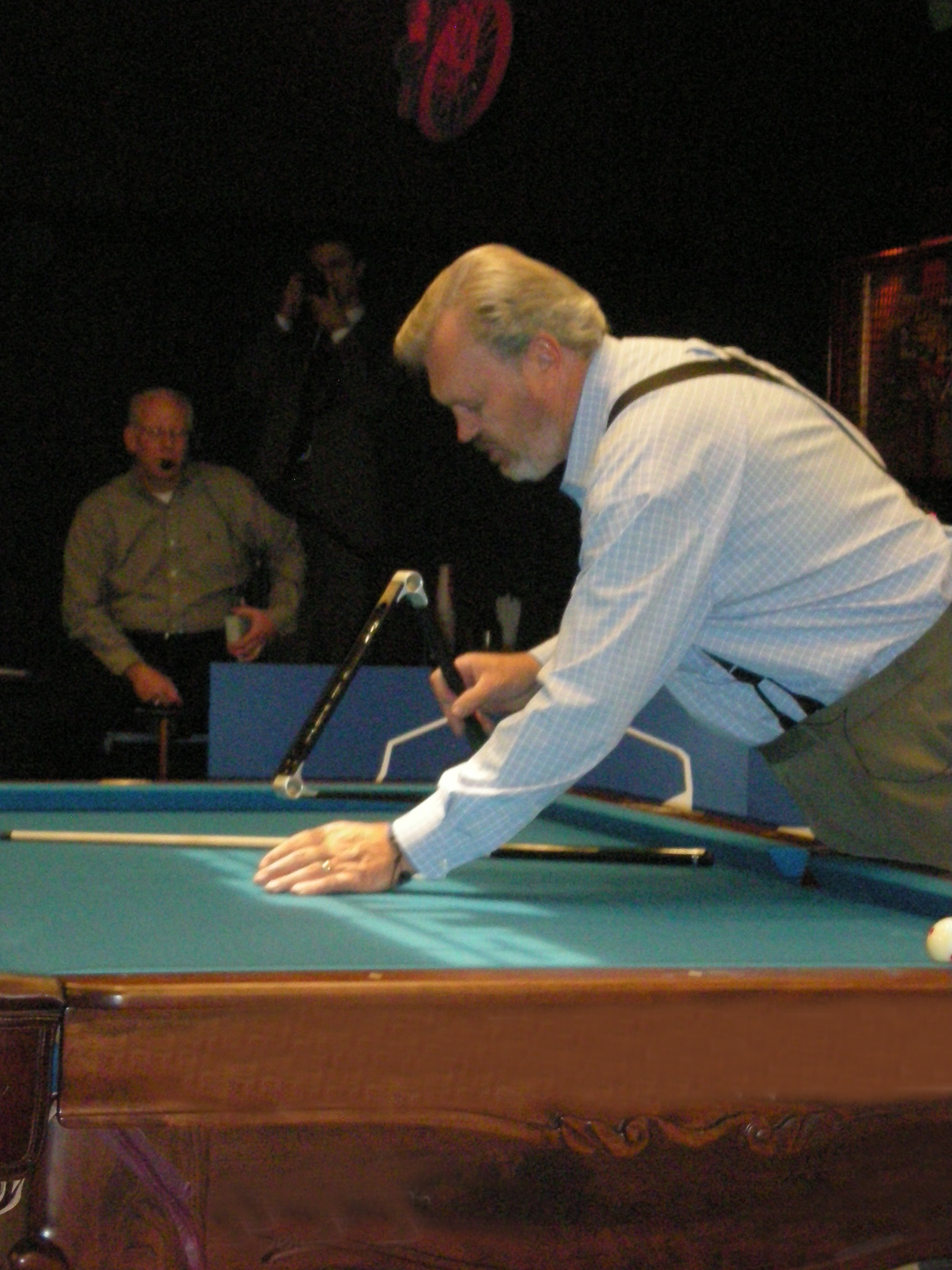
World Champion professional trick shot artist Mike Massey setting up a trick shot.

A trick shot (also trickshot or trick-shot) is a shot played on a billiards table (most often a pool table, though snooker tables are also used) which seems unlikely or impossible or requires significant skill. Trick shots frequently involve the balls organized in ways that do not correspond to normal play, such as balls being in a straight line, or use props such as extra cues or a triangle that would not be allowed on the table during a game. As an organized cue sports discipline, trick shot competition is known as artistic pool.

== Competition formats ==
Billiards trick shots are the subject of increasing international competition, both amateur and professional. There are world championships, such as the WPA World Artistic Pool Championships and the World Snooker Trickshot Championship (which has not been held since 2006), and made-for-TV events, such as Trick Shot Magic and the World Cup of Trick Shots, often televised in both the US and the UK and providing enough prize money that some professional players specialize in the discipline.

The formats vary depending on the competition. Some, such as the World Snooker Trickshot Championship are purely exhibitions, with a panel of judges scoring subjectively to determine the winner.

Events such as Trick Shot Magic and the World Cup feature head-to-head competition where the players select shots that have strictly outlined requirements specified in a playbook. Each year, players are allowed to submit their own shot inventions, however, they are disclosed prior to the event to give all players an equal chance to practice them. Players or teams are given two attempts to complete a selected shot within the given parameters, and earn one point for each successful shot, either a first shot or follow-up shot. Each player or team gets to select a given number of shots, generally eight or ten, and a winner is declared when one side is mathematically eliminated. Trick Shot Magic, ESPN's annual artistic pool pro tournament, has been widely considered the televised version of the World Artistic Pool Championship, and it has held the highest ratings in televised cue sports competitions in the United States between 2000 and 2009.

Artistic pool similarly (see below) has a program of shots (three attempts each, in a sliding-scale point system), with precisely outlined parameters requirements.

The Ultimate Trick Shot Tour features head-to-head competition between two players with no pre-defined shots. Players challenge each other with shots outlining the parameters of the shots just before shooting. Each player gets three attempts per shot, scoring one point per shot made. Each player gets to select a given number of shots, generally six to ten, and the winner is declared when one player is mathematically eliminated.

== Artistic pool ==
Artistic pool trick shot competitions (inspired by the related discipline of artistic billiards performed on a pocketless carom billiards table) began in the 1970s with international pros and coordinated by world champion Paul Gerni, with the World Trick Shot Artists Association, and in 2000, in Las Vegas, formed a new group, again with an international cast. They feature a program of 160 tricks to attempt, many of which were used in the previous formats by the WTSAA, and include the BCA North American Championship, EPBF European Championship, and WPA World Championship, among others. The tricks are now divided into eight "disciplines", including trick/fancy, prop/novelty/special arts, and disciplines for extremes in each of the core cueing techniques. The current world governing body for this sport is the WPA Artistic Pool Division, while the current largest league and player organization is the US-based Artistic Pool & Trick Shot Association (APTSA), which organizes the World Artistic Pool Championship (WAPC) annually, held concurrently with the more general VNEA International Pool Championship. The greatest contemporary champions of artistic pool include 22-time World Champion Paul Gerni, Mike Massey, Stefano Pelinga, Tom Rossman, and Andy Segal.

In WTSAA and APTSA competitions, competitors would have three chances to successfully perform each trick, earning full points if they are successful on their first attempts and incrementally reduced points for subsequent attempts. Each shot has an associated difficulty rating (also the point value) with a higher rating being more difficult. A preliminary round of 40 shots is performed, and the top players (the number varies depending on the number of competitors, but usually the top 12) proceed into a head-to-head playoff format to determine the winner. Proper and official artistic pool competitions feature equipment limitations, (one cue, one stroke per trick shot, one approved universal prop per shot per diagram if necessary, all shots on the bed of the table, etc.), and shot requirements (e.g., preclusion of any off-the-table tricks, such as are popular in events like Trick Shot Magic and World Cup of Trick Shots).

=== WPA World Artistic Pool Championship ===
Sanctioned by the World Pool-Billiard Association (WPA).

Year	Location	Gold	Silver	Bronze
2000	(United States) Las Vegas	Mike Massey (USA)	Tom Rossman (USA)	Sebastián Giumelli (ARG)
2001	(United States) Las Vegas	Charles Darling (USA)	Mike Massey (USA)	Herbert Friedemann (GER)
2002	(Germany) Willingen	Mike Massey (USA) (2)	Tom Rossman (USA)	Charles Darling (USA)
2003	(Ukraine) Kiev	Mike Massey (USA) (3)	Stefano Pelinga (ITA)	Sebastián Giumelli (ARG)
2004	(United States) Bell Gardens	Łukasz Szywała (POL)	Mike Massey (USA)	Tom Rosssman (USA)
2005	(United States) Southington	Mike Massey (USA) (4)	Nick Nikolaidis (CAN)	Mark Dimick (USA)
2006	(United States) Fridley	Tom Rossman (USA)	Mike Massey (USA)	Eric Yow (USA)
2007	(Russia) Saint Petersburg	Andy Segal (USA)	Sebastián Giumelli (ARG)	Mike Massey (USA)
2008	(United States) Duluth	Jamey Gray (USA)	Tom Rossman (USA)	Eric Yow (USA)
2011	(United States) King of Prussia	Andy Segal (USA) (2)	Jamey Gray (USA)	Tim Chin (USA)
2012	(United States) Oaks	Andy Segal (USA) (3)	Nick Nikolaidis (CAN)	Jamey Gray (USA)
2013	(United States) Las Vegas	Andy Segal (USA) (4)	Nick Nikolaidis (CAN)	Sebastián Giumelli (ARG)
2014	(United States) Las Vegas	Nick Nikolaidis (CAN)	Gabi Visoiu (ROU)	Andy Segal (USA)
2015	(United States) Kennesaw	Gabi Visoiu (ROU)	Florian Kohler (FRA)	Andy Segal (USA)
2016	(United States) Midwest City	William DeYonker (USA)	Abram Diaz (USA)	Florian Kohler (FRA)
2017	(China) Xingcheng	Sebastián Giumelli (ARG)	Łukasz Szywała (POL)	Florian Kohler (FRA)
2018	(United States) Houston	Gabi Visoiu (ROU) (2)	Florian Kohler (FRA)	Abram Diaz (USA)
2019	(United States) Parkersburg	Chi-ming Lin (TPE)	Theo Mihellis (USA)	Tim Chin (USA)
2022	(United States) Parkersburg	Chi-ming Lin (TPE) (2)	Tim Chin (USA)	Gastón Tomadoni (ARG)
2023	(United States) Bay City	Florian Kohler (FRA)	William DeYonker (USA)	Steve Markle (USA)
2024	(United States) Bay City	Florian Kohler (FRA) (2)	Tim Chin (USA)	Chi-ming Lin (TPE)
2026	(United States) Philadelphia	Florian Kohler (FRA) (3)	Steve Markle (USA)	Wayne Parker (RSA)

== Objects used ==
As with other pool and billiards games, trick shots usually utilize a cue ball, one or more object balls, and a cue stick. However, many props can be used in trick shots including bottles, drinking glasses, baskets, coins, ball racks, cue tip chalk, and other billiards- and non-billiards-related equipment. Props are used to change the difficulty of the shot or add aesthetic value. As with artistic billiards pros, trick shot artists often have specialized cue sticks for performing particular types of shots, particularly jump shots and massés.

== Disciplines of trick shots ==
Potting three balls at once.

The APTSA trick shot disciplines are:

1. Trick and/or fancy: Primarily deals with setup shots, multiple ball configurations, and/or a shot where cue ball travels in a "kick" pattern to make final ball(s). May also include "extreme" cut shots and special skill shots not in other disciplines.
2. Prop/novelty and special arts: Unusual or new shots of any nature, shots with "props", such as cues, bridge(s), rack(s), coin(s), chalk, etc., and shots of a unique or "special" art form, such as wing shots, time shots, "legal" or "illegal" follow-thru shots, push shots, roller coaster technique/waterfall specialties, plus demonstrations of one-handed jack up, behind back, under leg, and more. Referred to as general amusement category.
3. Draw: Basic to advanced with cue ball greater than 1/2" from first object ball. The cue ball contacts an object ball with draw (backspin) and pockets another.
4. Follow: A cue ball is hit with follow (topspin) and goes forth and hits in an object ball.
5. Bank/Kick: Bank, meaning to hit object ball(s) into cushion(s), and kicks meaning to hit cue ball into "x" number of cushions first and then to object ball(s).
6. Stroke: Cue ball less than 1/2" from first object ball(s), for draw or follow, plus accuracy position shots, speed control shots, or unique "stroke" shots.
7. Jump: Any shot utilizing jump shot technique, other than "prop" shots with bridge(s), and some special "stroke" shots.
8. Massé: Half and full Massé – cue elevations over 10 degrees.

== Examples of trick shots ==
Trick shot World Champion Steve Davis potting a ball under a cloth.

- "Machine gun": A number of object balls are placed in a row to form a line, sometimes near a cushion, or in a line and the cue ball is shot into the balls so as to reverberate between them while traveling and hit each one of the object balls in series, issuing a machine gun-like sound. Shots played with the balls in a line are often played in rapid succession, so the quick-fire shots are similar to the same noise.
- "The dollar bill shot": Introduced into competition by Paul Gerni, this shot uses a banknote, typically a US$100 bill, placed on the short rail near the corner pocket as a target landing zone. The cue ball is banked off eight or nine cushions and should land with the ball's edge over the banknote. This shot is used as a tiebreaker on Trick Shot Magic with the competitor landing closest to the bill winning the match.
- "Up and in": Often mistakenly thought to have originated with World Champion Mike Massey, this shot has much earlier origins, and was done in 1980 in Sweden by European champion Bengt Jonasson of Stockholm. He showed it to the gentleman of the American team (Paul Gerni, Jim Rempe and Mike Sigel) in an exhibition prior to the 1980 Swedish Open in Gothenburg, using a wooden shoe instead of a floppy cowboy boot, and prompting both Gerni and Rempe to stop at the gift shop at the Amsterdam airport on the way back to pick up some wooden shoes. In this shot, the cue ball is jumped off the table into a wooden shoe (a cowboy boot for Massey, 25 years later) on the floor, which made a nice "klack" sound in the case of the wooden shoe. In the U.S., the wooden shoe shot is sometimes referred to as "the boot shot".
- "The bottle shot": Two balls are balanced on top of a glass soda bottle. The cue ball pockets a ball in the side and gets propelled in the air, knocking the bottom ball from the top of the bottle, letting the top ball drop to rest on top of the bottle. This shot was conceived by Japanese player Yoshikazu Kimura, from Kyoto, and popularized by World champion Stefano Pelinga and trick shot artist Ken "Sarge" Aylesworth.
- "The butterfly": For this popular exhibition shot from players such as Willie Mosconi and Jimmy Caras, six object balls are grouped in the middle of the table in a butterfly shape; in a single shot, each ball drops into a different pocket in the billiards table.
- "Just showing off": Five object balls are clustered near the left side pocket and a hanging object ball in the lower right corner. The cue ball is sent in to the cluster pocketing all five balls and then travels 3 rails to pocket the hanging object ball. This shot was originally designed in the '60s by Paul Gerni, combining two previously popular trick shots, and made famous by Steve Mizerak in a Miller Lite beer commercial in 1978. This shot and the subsequent commercial boosted Mizerak's name recognition and vaulted him into the Hall of Fame. Gerni still showcases this shot in his present-day exhibitions, and it has now become a standard for most all pool exhibitions.
- "The snake shot": Fifteen object balls are placed across the table. The 15 ball is the first and it is placed 6 inches away from the corner pocket. Each successive ball is placed 3 inches behind the previous one in a winding chain. Each combination of balls beginning with the 1 and the 2 should be aligned so they aim toward the next ball in the chain. The cue ball must be set up in position to make a straight line with the first two-ball combination. When the 1 ball is hit it should cause a chain reaction as each two-ball set hits each other.
- "The Swing Shot": A rack hangs from above and swings back and forth. The player proceeds to jump balls through the moving rack and into the corner pockets.

== In popular culture ==
Various trick shot competitions (sometimes with footage dating back years) remain among the most dominant of ESPN's pool-related programming, and the World Snooker Trickshot Championship has enjoyed notable popularity in the UK. The British TV game show Big Break, which ran from 1991 to 2002, featured a round each week called "Virgo's Trick Shot". John Virgo would demonstrate a snooker trick shot which the contestant would then attempt to copy. The show also aired eight trick shot specials between 1995 and 1999.

Trick shots appear frequently in films and television. Perhaps the most outlandish case would be in BBC Two's science fiction comedy TV series Red Dwarf, episode "White Hole", in which the character Dave Lister uses his pool-playing skills to play a trick shot at an astronomical level in order to save the ship, using a thermonuclear device as a "cue" and planetary bodies as "balls". Most pool-themed films, such as Poolhall Junkies with a scene involving a high-stakes wager on a time shot, include difficult shots that some might classify as trick shots. Another example might be the character Vince pocketing the nine-ball "on the snap" when asked to, in the film version of The Color of Money.

== See also ==
- Trick bowling
