= Venomous (disambiguation) =

Venomous animals are those that secrete venom.

Venomous may also refer to:

== Arts and entertainment ==
- Venomous (album), by Burgerkill, 2011
- The Venomous, an album by Nightrage, 2017
- Venomous, an album by Skinlab, 2019
- Venomous (film), a 2001 American film directed by Fred Olen Ray
- Professor Venomous, a fictional character in the TV series OK K.O.! Let's Be Heroes

=== Television episodes ===
- "Venomous", Teen Wolf (2011) season 2, episode 5 (2012)
- "Venomous", Ultimate Spider-Man season 1, episode 11 (2012)

== Other uses ==
- HMS Venomous, a Royal Navy destroyer
- VeNoMouS, New Zealand member of the hacktivist group milw0rm

== See also ==
- Venom (disambiguation)
