= World Snooker Trickshot Championship =

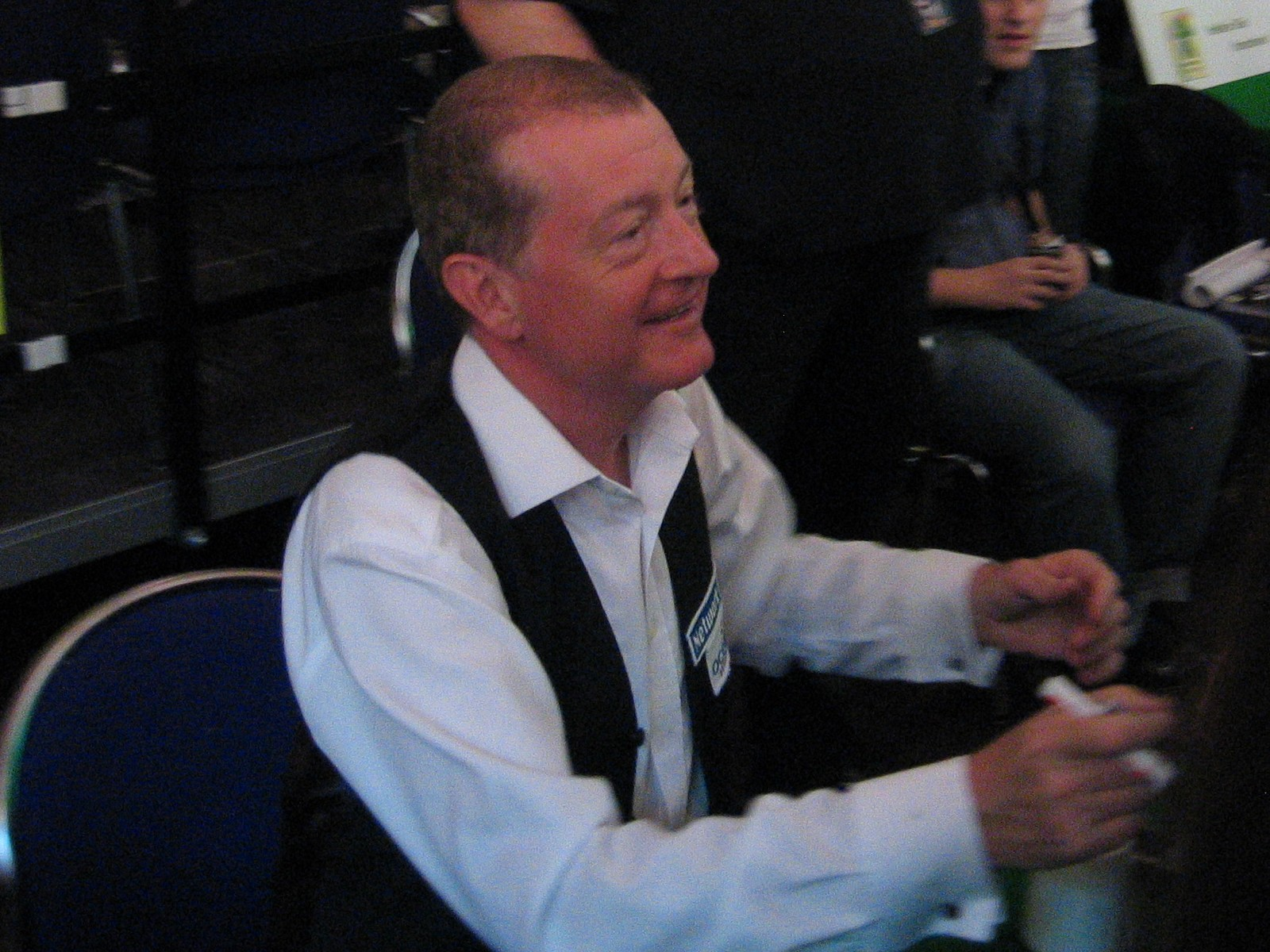
Steve Davis - Three time winner in 1994, 1995 & 1997

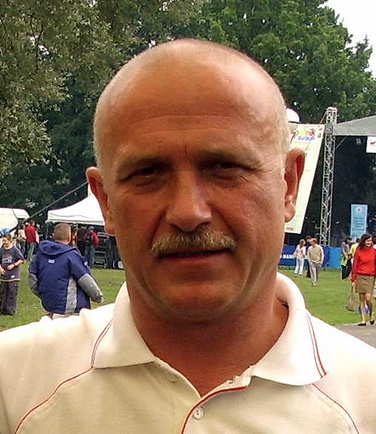
6-time winner Bogdan Wołkowski

The World Snooker Trickshot Championship was a trick shot world championship, played on Snooker tables; generally played by primarily Snooker-based players. The event was played between 1991 and 2006, and was organised by Matchroom Sport. Events generally used a combination of judges scores, and audience vote to determine the winners.

== Tournament winners ==
Year	Location	Winner
1991	(England) Stoke-on-Trent	(Wales) Terry Griffiths
1992	(England) Brentwood	(United States) Mike Massey
1994	(South Africa) Sun City	(England) Steve Davis (Wales) Terry Griffiths
1995	(South Africa) Sun City	(England) Steve Davis
1996	(South Africa) Sun City	(Canada) Alain Robidoux
1997	(England) Dagenham	(England) Steve Davis (Northern Ireland) Dennis Taylor (United States) Mike Massey
1998	(Belgium) Antwerp	(Canada) Alain Robidoux
1999	(Scotland) Paisley	(Poland) Bogdan Wołkowski
2000	(Scotland) Glenrothes	(Poland) Bogdan Wołkowski
2001	(England) Croydon	(Poland) Bogdan Wołkowski
2002	(Scotland) Glenrothes	(Poland) Bogdan Wołkowski
2003	(England) Sunderland	(Poland) Bogdan Wołkowski
2004	(Wales) Colwyn Bay	(Poland) Bogdan Wołkowski
2005	(England) Doncaster	(United States) Mike Massey
2006	(England) Preston	(France) Vincent Facquet
