= Backhand English =

Backhand English (BHE) is a cue sports technique used to compensate for cue ball deflection and swerve when applying sidespin. The player first aligns the cue for a center-ball hit toward the target, then pivots the cue around the bridge hand to move the tip sideways to the chosen contact point on the cue ball. To be accurate, the player has to put the bridge hand at the exact effective pivot length for the shot, because that is what makes the deflection and the curve cancel each other out and sends the cue ball right to the ghost ball spot at contact. Getting the cue ball to the ghost ball is only part of the shot though, because the player still has to adjust the aim line for throw, and that adjustment is based on whether the spin being used is above or below the gearing English point.

Front-hand English (FHE) keeps the back hand perfectly still as the pivot point, while the player moves the front hand side to side to apply the spin. Both are aim-and-pivot techniques, in contrast to parallel English (PE), in which the whole cue is shifted sideways without a pivot.

== History and terminology ==
The aim-and-pivot method of compensating for cue ball deflection is considerably older than the modern name for it. Writing in Billiards Digest in August 2002, Bob Jewett described a plate from Edwin Kentfield's The Game of Billiards, first published in 1839, in which the cue is shown pivoted to the right for right sidespin and pivoted to the left for left sidespin, which Jewett says shows roughly the amount of squirt compensation that Kentfield thought was needed. In his October 2002 column Jewett set the method out in full and wrote that in modern discussion it goes by two self-explanatory names, aim and pivot and backhand English. The technique was later analyzed in detail by David Alciatore, a mechanical engineering professor at Colorado State University, through his technical proofs, videos and articles in Billiards Digest.

Ron Shepard examined the mathematics behind cue ball deflection in his 2001 paper on squirt, working out the pivot point needed to counteract it. Shepard describes the procedure as the aim and pivot approach proposed by Bob Jewett in the June 1997 issue of Billiards Digest, and he writes that when a player uses the same shot to aim with sidespin rather than to measure a cue, the technique is sometimes called backhand English.

The technique and its physics have also been covered in published books independent of Alciatore. The physics of cue ball deflection was also analyzed in a peer-reviewed paper in the American Journal of Physics by Rod Cross.

The term "backhand English" is sometimes used colloquially to describe a stroke swoop where the back hand moves sideways during the stroke. As an aim-and-pivot technique, however, it refers strictly to moving the back hand prior to the stroke after the center-ball alignment has been established.

== Methods ==
=== Backhand English (BHE) ===
To execute BHE, the player sets the bridge at the effective pivot length for the shot, based on the shot criteria: the distance from cue ball to object ball, the power of the shot, and the height of the spin. After aligning the center-ball hit, the player freezes the bridge and then shifts the back hand sideways to place the tip on the desired sidespin offset. When the bridge is at the correct pivot point, the deflection and the curve have been controlled by the bridge length to cancel each other out, so the cue ball arrives at the ghost ball spot at perfect contact.

=== Front-hand English (FHE) ===
FHE differs from BHE only in which hand stays still, because the player keeps the back hand fixed as the pivot and moves the front hand sideways to set the tip offset.

=== Variable-bridge BHE ===
Another approach is variable-bridge BHE, where the player keeps a pure backhand pivot but physically slides the bridge hand closer to the cue ball for fast, short shots and further back for slow, long shots. This gives the player a physical anchor on the shaft for each shot condition instead of estimating hand shifts in mid-air.

=== SAWS (System for Aiming With Sidespin) ===
Developed by David Alciatore, SAWS lets a player keep a comfortable, fixed bridge length for every shot instead of constantly sliding the hand back and forth. To adjust for the shot's speed and distance without moving the bridge, the player uses specific percentages of backhand and front-hand movements.

=== Parallel English (PE) ===
PE differs from both pivot methods because the player shifts the whole cue sideways without any pivot, keeping it parallel to the original center-ball line.

== Factors that change pivot length ==
Because the cue has to be held slightly elevated to clear the rails, the cue ball hops a little off the cloth when it is struck. The curve only develops while the ball is in contact with the cloth, so on a fast shot the swerve is delayed and the ball can reach the object ball before it curves. On a fast, short shot, only squirt matters, and the bridge stays close to the cue's natural pivot length. On a slower or longer shot, the cloth has time to grip the ball and swerve develops, partly or fully canceling the squirt, so the player needs a longer bridge.

The mass at the tip end of the cue plays a pivotal role in the performance of a cue. The lighter that mass, the lower the deflection of the shaft. Reported pivot lengths cover a wide range. Bob Jewett wrote in June 1997 that lengths from eight inches up to three feet had been reported, and in October 2002 he gave the reported range as 8 to 50 inches. Ron Shepard's 2001 paper puts a high-squirt cue at around a 10-inch pivot point, an average cue in the 16 to 18 inch range, a good cue at around 30 inches, and a low-squirt cue at 40 inches or longer. Traditional solid wood shafts are usually heavier at the tip, giving them shorter pivot lengths. Predator started to hollow out the wooden shafts below the tip to lighten the tip and increase the low-deflection characteristic of the shaft. They called it the 314. While many carbon fiber shafts are hollowed out to reduce tip mass and lower deflection, not all carbon fiber shafts are the same. Stiffer carbon fiber shafts can have end mass and pivot lengths much closer to traditional wood. Researchers and instructors such as David Alciatore have noted that because modern low-deflection shafts have pivot points much farther back, bridging at that length can become impractical for players trying to use an aim-and-pivot method.

The exact bridge length required for a specific shot is not a single fixed number, because table and shot conditions change how swerve fights against initial squirt:

- How hard the ball is hit: Slower shots give the ball more time to curve, which means the player needs a longer bridge. Faster shots suppress that curve, so the bridge needs to be shorter, closer to the cue's natural pivot point.
- The distance of the shot: The farther the ball has to roll to reach the object ball, the more time it has to curve, so the player needs a longer bridge.
- The angle of the spin axis, topspin or backspin (which the player sets with the height of the spin): Topspin makes the ball reach its natural roll sooner than backspin, so it starts curving earlier. This means follow shots need a longer pivot length than draw shots hit at the same speed.
- Cue elevation: When the player has to raise the back of the cue, like when bridging on the rail or reaching over another ball, the cue ball hops further off the cloth and curves much more, which forces the player to adjust the bridge length to compensate.
- The pool table cloth: A slick, fast table cloth produces less curve, while older or sticky cloth adds friction that makes the ball curve more, changing the required pivot length.

== Self-correcting properties ==
When the bridge is set at the right pivot length, the stroke becomes a bit more forgiving of small errors. If the player accidentally hits the cue slightly wider or narrower than planned, the change in squirt and the pivot angle work together to cancel each other out, making sure the cue ball hits the exact spot at that distance and speed.

== Throw compensation ==
Aim-and-pivot methods like BHE and FHE only compensate for cue ball deflection and swerve. They do not automatically adjust for cut-induced throw or spin-induced throw.

While throw is minimal on many standard shots, it becomes a major factor on stun shots, slow shots near a half-ball hit, and small-cut shots with sidespin. To handle this, any system requires a separate adjustment for throw based on whether the spin is above or below the gearing English point. For any given cut angle and speed, there is a specific amount of outside English called gearing English where the spin exactly cancels out the collision throw. If the applied spin is different from the gearing amount, the player must aim slightly to the side of the spin to compensate. For example, if a player uses left spin that is greater than the gearing amount for a cut to the right, the object ball is thrown to the right, so the player must aim slightly left to compensate. If the applied spin is less than the gearing amount, or if inside English is used, the object ball is thrown to the left, and the player must aim slightly right.

== Calibration and practice ==
Because the effective pivot length changes with shot conditions, players using variable-bridge methods calibrate their cues through direct measurement. Instructional literature describes calibration drills using markers or sentinel balls to test bridge length. In a standard drill, a player shoots a straight-in shot with sidespin through a narrow gap created by two sentinel balls. If the cue ball strikes the ball on the same side as the spin, it shows the bridge was too short and the pivot point was too close, so the player moves the bridge farther from the cue ball. If the cue ball strikes the ball on the opposite side, it shows the bridge was too long, so the player moves the bridge closer. When the bridge is correct, the cue ball passes cleanly through the gap, establishing the right pivot length for that combination of speed, distance, and spin.
