= Gabi Visoiu =

Romanian pool player

Gabriel Visoiu (nickanamed "Mr. Perfect") is a Romanian artistic pool player. He is two-time winner of the WPA World Artistic Pool Championship in 2015 and 2018, and runner-up in 2014. Visiou won the final Trick Shot Magic event in 2016 as he defeated Andy Segal in the final 8–6.

Visoiu took part in the first pool tournament to be filmed and broadcast in 3DTV in 2011. Visoiu first won a world championship event in 2007 as he won the bank and kick discipline.
