= Steel Venom =

Steel Venom may refer to:

- Steel Venom (Valleyfair), an impulse roller coaster at Valleyfair in Shakopee, Minnesota
- Steel Venom (Geauga Lake), an impulse roller coaster formerly at Geauga Lake in Aurora, Ohio
