= Venon =

Venon may refer to the following communes in France:

- Venon, Eure, in the Eure department
- Venon, Isère, in the Isère department
- Uzay-le-Venon, in the Cher department
