= Sea Venom =

Sea Venom may refer to:

- de Havilland Sea Venom, a 1950s-era carrier based fighter aircraft
- Sea Venom (missile), an air to surface anti-ship missile
