= Venom (game) =

Play-by-mail fantasy wargame

- Publishers: Game Systems, Inc., Comstar
- Years active: 1988 to unknown
- Genres: Role-playing, fantasy wargame
- Languages: English
- Players: 20
- Playing time: Fixed
- Materials required: Instructions, order sheets, turn results, paper, pencil
- Media type: Play-by-mail

Venom is a closed-end, computer-moderated, play-by-mail (PBM) wargame. It was published by Game Systems, Inc. in 1989. Twenty players role-played demigods battling for supremacy by developing their position and winning a final battle. Demigod characters were highly customizable in the manner of spaceships for space-based PBM games. The game received generally poor reviews before the publisher revised the game in 1990 which improved the game according to one reviewer.

== History and development ==
Venom was a closed-ended, computer moderated PBM game. Originally published by Comstar, Game Systems Inc. acquired and republished it in 1988. In the May 1990 issue of Flagship, the publisher stated that it was making eleven game improvements based on feedback. By 1992, the game revisions were implemented.

== Gameplay ==
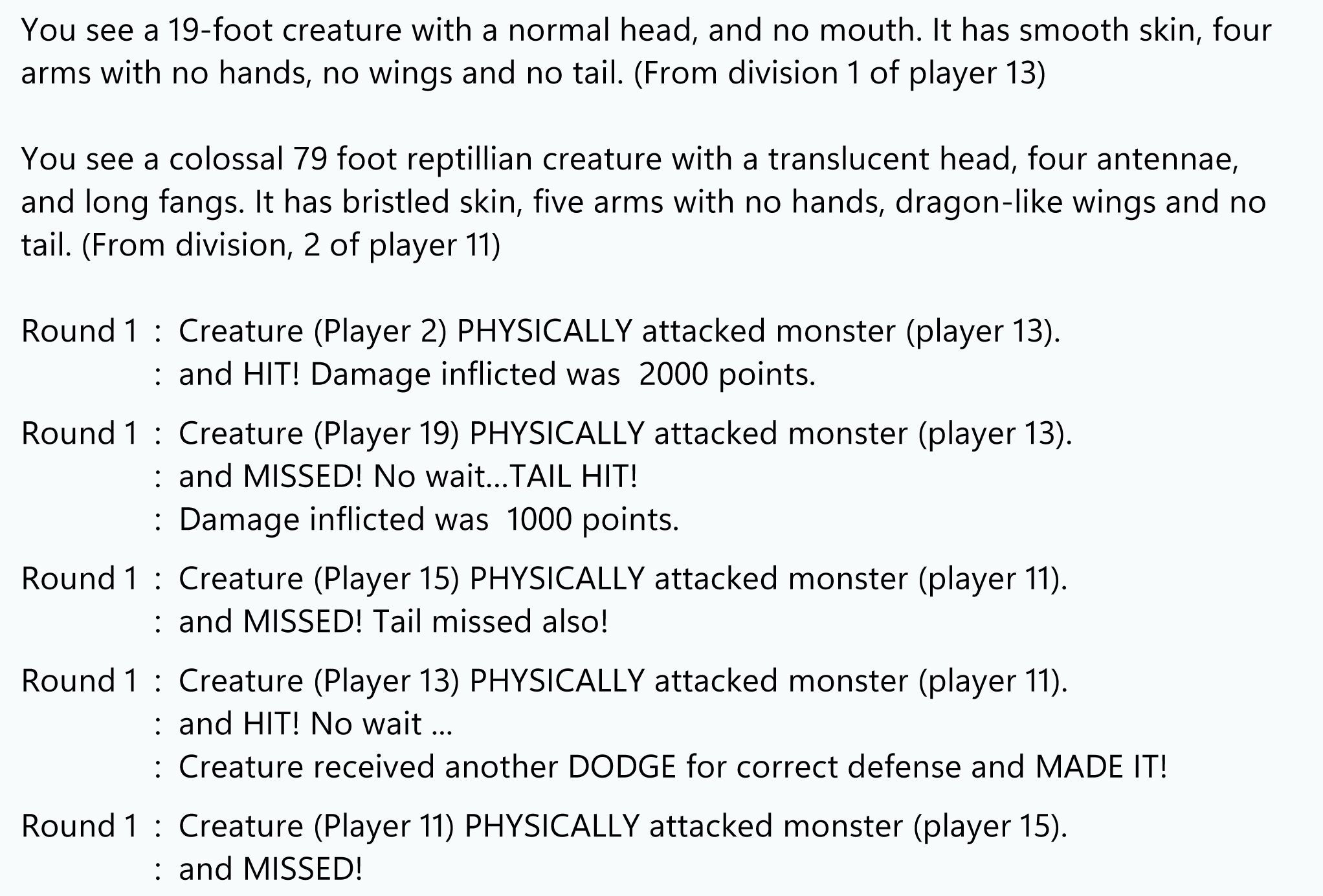
An example of combat in the Ninth Dimension from a turn sheet.

Venom was a fantasy wargame fought among 20 players. It had an "unusual and interesting premise" where players act as demigods struggling for domination. Games comprised three phases, the first included developing one's position through "spells, miracles and combat between armies of angels, spirits, ghosts and shadows". The second phase involves players preparing for the final battle in phase three which determines the game's winner. Losing all life points could cause defeat before the final battle.

Gameplay occurred on a 54 × 40 grid square map with a cloud layer and a second ground layer with various population areas. The game also had a "Ninth Dimension" arena for combat. Demigods were customizable with nine variable body part types. For example, ten different arm options were available. Various magic items were available, providing different spell options. This was a fantasy corollary of science fiction PBM games which allowed players to customize spaceships.

== Reception ==
Vickie Lloyd reviewed the game in the May–June 1989 issue of Paper Mayhem. She stated, "I feel that Venom is a waste of money and wouldn't recommend it to anyone." J. W. Akers-Sassaman reviewed the original version of the game in a 1990 issue of Flagship. He stated that "It has all the earmarks of a successful game: interesting premise, lots of atmosphere, reliable moderation and customer service, and an affordable price." He noted various design flaws and pointed to objections to occult topics in the period as a potential issue for players.

Stewart Wieck reviewed Venom in White Wolf #16 (June/July, 1989), rating it a 4 out of 5 and stated that "Venom is a game of many levels. In order to win you must master every level of play."

Van Norton reviewed the game in 1992 after publisher revisions. He noted that the general outline of the game was unchanged but it was "easier to play and more balanced" than the 1990 version.

== See also ==
- List of play-by-mail games

== Bibliography ==
- Akers-Sassaman, J.W. (May 1990). "Venom is Hellish". Flagship. No. 26 (U.S. ed.). pp. 54–56.
- "The Spokesmen Speak: Fantasy Wargames". Flagship. No. 19 (U.S. ed.). 1988. p. 30.
- Game Systems, Inc. (May 1990). "A Response by Game Systems Inc". Flagship. No. 26 (U.S. ed.). p. 56.
- Heine, Bill (May–June 1989). "Hard Times in the 9th Dimension". Paper Mayhem. No. 36. p. 15.
- Heine, Bill (July–August 1990). "The Venom Review: Or How I Found Nirvana Through Backstabbing". Paper Mayhem. No. 43. pp. 8–13.
- Lloyd, Vicky (May–June 1989). "Game System Inc.'s Venom". Paper Mayhem. No. 36. pp. 16–19.
- Norton, Van (May 1992). "Venom: Once Bitten...". Flagship. No. 37 (U.S. ed.). pp. 7–9.
