= Stefano Pelinga =

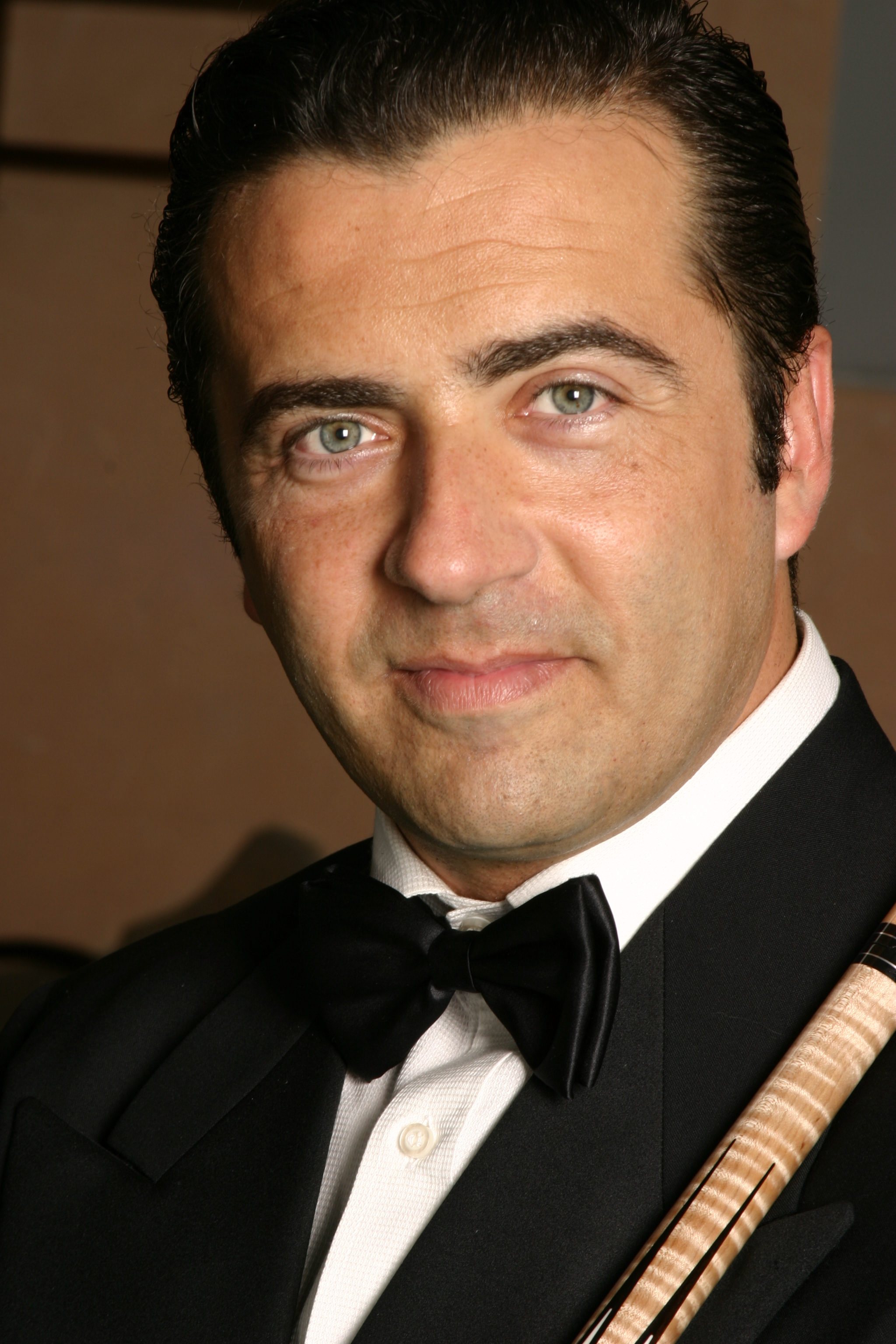
- Stefano Pelinga
- Born: May 1964 (age 62); Rome, Italy
- Other names: Mr. Trick Shots; Il Maestro (The Master)
- Years active: 1976–present
- Website: http://StefanoPelinga.com

Stefano Pelinga (born May 1964) is an Italian professional pool (pocket billiards) player from Rome. He is best known as a multi-year international artistic pool champion, as both an individual and team captain. He has also served as an officer for the Polizia di Stato (Italy's national police) for 27 years, retiring from police work in 2011, then moving to Las Vegas, Nevada to play pool full-time. Pelinga has served as a board member of the International Artistic Poolplayers Association (IAPA). He was the featured player on the cover of the May 2010 issue of Billiards Digest magazine, which named him one of the world's best trick shot artists. He has been nicknamed "Mr. Trick Shots" and "Il Maestro" ("The Master"). Aside from competition, Pelinga performs exhibitions, organizes competitions and raises funds for a variety of charitable organizations with his personal appearances. He was invited to tour in the US with Paul Gerni, Norway's Lars Riiber, and Japan's Yoshikazu Kimura, and nominated by Paul Gerni for a spot on ESPN's Trick Shot Magic, where he has been featured for over ten years. He won two Trick Shot Magic events, in 2005 and 2007, after a few second places.

In addition to having won several international titles, Pelinga has also produced a series of instructional videos, and he was appointed on January 31, 2000, as official instructor of cue sports by the Italian Federation of Billiard Sports (FIBiS) and the Italian National Olympic Committee (CONI). He was also awarded the honorary title of Professor of Sport Games by the University of Kharkiv (Ukraine).

Pelinga has a large repertoire of trick shots and is able to execute over 1,000 unique and "fancy" shots. He is recognized as one of the greatest trick shot champions in the history of the sport, and has earned a spot in ESPN's Trick Shot Magic Hall of Fame. In 2012, Pelinga was inducted into the National Italian American Sports Hall of Fame.

Pelinga is represented by (and in turn represents, as co-founder and Western & International Executive Manager) the booking agent Billiards Superstars Promotions, who also represent Paul Gerni, Allison Fisher, Mike Massey, Ewa Laurance and other top pool pros.

== Early life ==
Pelinga began to play pool at age 12, drawing inspiration from his favorite singer and actor, Dean Martin, whom he emulates in various parts of his life. He has also stated and exhibited his Dean Martin memorabilia collection, which includes "every applicable book and record album, plus publicity photos, newspaper and magazine clippings, novelty statuettes, comic books, and even a copy of Dino's death certificate." He also cites Paul Gerni, Mike Massey and Yoshikazu Kimura as influences. While he was a teenager, he "became a black belt in Kung Fu and then...switched to boxing...for several years." During his years in university, he focused his studies on foreign languages, specifically English.

Pelinga began serving as a police officer in the beginning of 1985. He became a member of the Polizia di Stato (Italian Federal Police) for the Calabria region after six months of police training. A part of the Reparto volanti group, he continued to serve even while pursuing his billiards career until 2011, when he retired from police work with pension.

== Pro pool career ==
Pelinga won several national titles in Italy in straight pool and nine-ball throughout the late 1970s and 1980s and began traveling around Italy giving exhibitions under the sponsorship of Longoni Cues. In 1990, he asked Longoni if he would be allowed to meet Paul Gerni on his arrival at the airport in Rome, and that was their first meeting, Gerni's exhibition and TV documentary, and personal training from Gerni during that tour first got Pelinga interested in artistic pool, the formalized practice of trick shots. After speaking with Gerni and acting as his translator, Pelinga explained his interest in learning to become a professional trick shot artist. Gerni, in response, had Pelinga accompany him on a tour throughout the United States as a pseudo-apprenticeship. In 2003, he won the U.S. Open of Artistic Pool in New Bedford, Massachusetts, followed by another major title, the EPBF European Artistic Pool Championship in St. Petersburg, Russia, in 2004. In 2005 and 2007, Pelinga won the prestigious ESPN Trick Shot Magic title.

In 2006, he competed in the first annual trans-Atlantic World Cup of Trick Shots, as captain of Team Europe, who lost to Team USA that year; his team won in 2007. In 2008, Pelinga competed in the second annual Showdown in Seoul, playing against World Three-cushion Billiards Champion from Turkey, Semih Saygıner in both artistic pool and artistic billiards. On October 29, 2009, he was a part of the fourth World Cup of Trick Shots on Team Europe, in which he and his team lost to their American counterparts. His European team won again in 2010 and 2011.

He organized a "World Legends of Artistic Pool" event" in Kyiv in 2006 to showcase trick shots, with the participation of the greatest contemporary trick shot champions.

On November 17, 2012, Pelinga was inducted into the National Italian American Sports Hall of Fame (NIASHF), based in Chicago, Illinois, becoming the second pool player in the history of the organization to be inducted, after Willie Mosconi.

Soon after Pelinga launched on the market his successful invention, the "Cloth Shield," a thin layer of indestructible plastic that preserves the pool table cloth when players practice jump and masse shots.

In April 2022, Stefano published an autobiographical/instructional book titled "Bringing the House Down."

== Titles and achievements ==
- 2012 National Italian American Sports Hall of Fame
- 2011 ESPN World Cup of Trick Shots Team Europe (Captain)
- 2010 ESPN World Cup of Trick Shots Team Europe (Captain)
- 2007 ESPN World Cup of Trick Shots Team Europe (Captain)
- 2007 ESPN Trick Shot Magic Championship
- 2005 ESPN Trick Shot Magic Championship
- 2004 European Artistic Pool Championship
- 2003 U.S. Open Championship Trick Shot Division
- 2002 World Championship Massé Shots
- 2002 World Championship Jump Shots
- 2002 World Championship Prop & Novelty Shots

== Works ==
- The Magic of Trick Shots, Instructional VHS Video, 1999
- Ultimate Trick Shots, Instructional DVD, Volumes I & II, 2005
- Amazing Trick Shots Made Easy, Instructional DVD, 2007
- More Amazing Trick Shots Made Easy, Instructional DVD, 2007
- Even More Amazing Trick Shots Made Easy, Instructional DVD, 2007
- Cloth Shield, Felt Protector, 2015
- Bringing the House Down, Autobiography/Instructional Book, 2022
