= American Poolplayers Association =

Amateur pool organization in the US

The American Poolplayers Association (APA) is a pool league for amateur pool (pocket billiards) competition in the United States. The APA conducts pool leagues and tournaments in the disciplines of eight-ball and nine-ball with a unified ruleset. The organization was founded in 1981 by professional pool players Terry Bell and Larry Hubbart, with roots dating back to the National Pool League (NPL), founded in 1979. The APA bills itself as the largest pool league in the world with a membership of more than 250,000 players in the United States, Canada, Japan, and Singapore. The organization franchises its local league operations worldwide; some of these league operators are former professional pool players, including Ewa Laurance and Jeanette Lee. The APA is headquartered in Lake St. Louis, Missouri.

The APA employs a proprietary handicapping system called "The Equalizer" that allows players of all abilities to compete with one another on an equal basis. The normal APA team matches consist of five race-format one-on-one competitions (similar to matches in the USA Pool League, and very different from the round-robin format used by the BCA Pool League and VNEA). In addition to this team play, APA organizers at the local level often set up non-team tournaments, doubles play, and other formats; the annual international championships feature both individual and team play.

The APA hosts several major pool tournaments each year, two of them in Las Vegas: the APA Poolplayer Championships for individual players in late April/early May and the APA World Pool Championships for teams in August. The latter event was certified as "The World's Largest Pool Tournament" by Guinness World Records in 2010. In November, the APA conducts the U.S. Amateur Championship, representing the highest level of amateur play in the United States. Children and teenagers ages 7–18 may compete in the APA Junior Championships, held in St. Louis each summer.

== Eight-ball ==
In APA eight-ball, two players compete until one person wins the number of games determined by their respective skill level. The following table illustrates the number of games needed to be won by each skill level, depending on the skill level of their opponent.

Skill	2	3	4	5	6	7
2	2/2	2/3	2/4	2/5	2/6	2/7
3	3/2	2/2	2/3	2/4	2/5	2/6
4	4/2	3/2	3/3	3/4	3/5	2/5
5	5/2	4/2	4/3	4/4	4/5	3/5
6	6/2	5/2	5/3	5/4	5/5	4/5
7	7/2	6/2	5/2	5/3	5/4	5/5

Skill levels in eight-ball range from 2 to 7. In higher-level tournament play, male pool players must compete at a skill level of 3 or higher.

As an example of how to read the table, if Player A is a skill level 2 and Player B is a 6, the scorer first locates the row for skill level 2, then moving across finds the column for skill level 6. The intersection provides for a 2–6 race; meaning the match ends when either Player A wins two games or Player B wins six games.

== Nine-ball ==
In APA nine-ball, two players compete until one person reaches a score determined by their respective skill level. The scoring is recorded by awarding a single point for pocketing the balls numbered 1 through 8 and two points for the 9-ball. For example, if Player A breaks and makes two balls on the break (not including the 9-ball), that player would have two points for the rack and continue shooting. If the player makes all the balls without missing ("break-and-run"), they score 10 points for the rack (the maximum) as they would have scored eight points for the balls 1 through 8 and then two for the 9-ball. The match ends when a player reaches the number required for their respective skill level. The table below lists the number of balls needed for a player of each skill level to win their match.

Note that APA nine-ball is not a traditional style that is typically played by billiard enthusiasts. Even though it does follow traditional rotation characteristics, it resembles more of a straight pool (14.1) tradition by opponents racing to a specific number of balls pocketed.

Skill Level	Points needed to win match
1	14
2	19
3	25
4	31
5	38
6	46
7	55
8	65
9	75

Skill levels in nine-ball range from 1 to 9. In higher-level tournament play (except the Junior Championship), male pool players must compete at a skill level of 3 or higher.

According to the table above, if Player A is rated a 2 and plays Player B is rated a 6, then Player A wins if he scores 19 points before Player B scores 46 points. Conversely, for Player B to win the match, he must score 46 points before Player A scores 19 points.

As APA nine-ball is based on points and not games won (contrast with BCA Pool League nine-ball which is based on games won, where the winner of each game is the player pocketing the 9-ball), a match can end before all the balls of a given rack have been pocketed. Using the previous Player A (skill level 2) vs. Player B (skill level 6) example, suppose that Player B is breaking a new rack, leading 44–16. In this case, Player A needs three points to win, and Player B needs two points to win. The match ends when either player earns the needed points to win, regardless of the number of balls remaining on the table.

== Tournaments ==
The APA hosts four major international pool tournaments annually. Participants must be APA members (except in the U.S. Amateur Championship), and qualifying for these events is done through weekly league play and regional qualifying tournaments conducted by APA local league operator franchisees.

Two of these events are held at the Westgate Las Vegas Resort & Casino in Las Vegas. The APA Poolplayer Championships (formerly known as the National Singles Championships), held in late April/early May, features individual and doubles competition. The APA World Pool Championships in August showcases team (5-8 members), doubles, and Masters (three-player non-handicapped) play. Participants qualify for these events through local tournaments and weekly league play conducted by local APA league operators. The Westgate has hosted these tournaments since 2016. Previously, APA held the events at the Riviera Hotel and Casino from 1994 until the hotel closed in 2015. In the week leading up to the Riviera's closure, the APA held its annual league operators' convention in conjunction with the 2015 National Singles Championship. The final event ever held at the Riviera was an awards ceremony for the APA's 2015 8-Ball Classic on May 3, 2015 at 7 p.m., hosted by APA then-President Renee Lyle and Marketing Director Jason Bowman. In 2010, the World Pool Championships (then known as the APA National Team Championships) were recognized by Guinness World Records as "The World's Largest Pool Tournament".

In November, the APA conducts the U.S. Amateur Championship in Palm Harbor, Florida. Intended for the highest-skilled pool players, this non-handicapped tournament is open to APA members and non-members alike.

The APA Junior Championships are held every July in Lake St. Louis, Missouri. This nine-ball singles tournament is the only national event open to children and teenagers ages 7–18 at the time of the event.

== Affiliations ==
As of 2023, the APA has three international affiliates or branches: the Canadian Poolplayers Association (CPA) in Canada and the Japanese Poolplayers Association (JPA) in Japan, and the APA of Singapore. Members of these non-U.S. associations are eligible to compete in the annual APA championships.

APA has sponsored Team USA in the annual Mosconi Cup.

APA is also a major sponsor of the WPBA Tour, the most-televised pool competitions in North America, and thus a major venue for APA advertising.
