= Cue sports techniques =

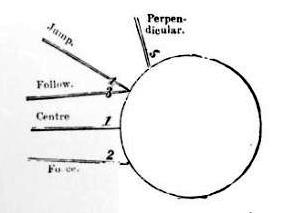
Illustration from Michael Phelan's 1859 book, The Game of Billiards

Cue sports techniques (usually more specific, e.g., billiards techniques, snooker techniques) are a vital important aspect of game play in the various cue sports such as carom billiards, pool, snooker and other games. Such techniques are used on each shot in an attempt to achieve an immediate aim such as scoring or playing a safety, while at the same time exercising control over the positioning of the cue ball and often the object balls for the next shot or inning.

In carom games, an advanced player's aim on most shots is to leave the cue ball and the object balls in position so that the next shot is of a less difficult variety to make the requisite carom, and so that the next shot is in position to be manipulated in turn for yet another shot, ad infinitum.

Similarly, in many pocket billiards games, an advanced player's aim is to manipulate the cue ball so that it is in position to pocket (pot) a chosen next object ball, and so that the next shot can also be manipulated for the next shot, and so on. Whereas in the carom games, manipulation of the object ball's position is crucial as well on every shot, in some pool games this is not as large a factor because on a successful shot the object ball is pocketed. However, many shots in one-pocket, for example, have this same added object ball control factor for most shots.

If a player is not attempting to score or pocket, depending on the game, then the goal is usually to exercise control over the cue ball to leave some type of safety to make it more difficult for the opponent to score or pocket.

In order to control the cue ball on a shot, a player must master a wide variety of techniques, and have a well-founded conceptual grasp of the mechanics involved. As stated by George Fels, "pool's poet laureate":

The mere pocketing of a ball isn't that hard; in fact, it's relatively simple. What drives many, many players to distraction is the unpredictability of the cueball's path of travel .... [T]he game of billiards requires you to drive a ball someplace; pool, in any form, mostly asks you to stop a ball someplace. In either case, you'll fare much better when you understand the how and why of a ball's getting from one place to another.

== Stance ==
There is no single universally accepted stance, with a wide variation between players who compete at professional cuesports. However, there are a number of common characteristics: generally the back leg is braced while the front leg is slightly bent with the player leaning into the shot; the player's weight is evenly distributed, and the body remains still for the duration of the shot. Many of the modern players face the line of the shot, while a more traditional stance would see the player twist their body so their back foot is at a right-angle to the shot.

== Sidespin (english) ==
The term english (usually not capitalized in this context, and often called "side" in the UK, and sometimes simply called "left" or "right") normally refers to sidespin put on a cue ball by hitting it to the left or right of center. English is used for position by altering the angle of reflection of the cue ball after it contacts a rail cushion. More specific terms are sometimes employed, including "reverse english" for side that closes the cue ball's angle after contacting a cushion, and "natural english" or "running english" for side that widens that angle. Both left and right english change the direction an object ball takes upon impact with the cue ball (the "throw" effect). For advanced players it is important to understand how the use of english can cause the cue ball to veer off its aiming line (an effect called deflection or "squirt").

An above-center hit on the cue ball is more precisely referred to as "follow" ("top" in the UK), while a below-center hit is "draw", "bottom", or "back-spin". Any time the cue ball is not struck directly in the center of the vertical axis, some sidespin will be imparted either left or right on the cue ball. This unintentional sidespin is a common source of missed shots. Cue-ball spin is not always the shooter's doing; some spin is naturally imparted to the cue ball from contact with the cloth surface on the bed of the table, and by the table's cushions.

== Follow ==
Follow, sometimes called top spin or simply "top," is spin in the direction of travel of the cue ball, so that it is spinning faster than it would from its natural roll. If the cue ball has top spin on it, it will resume rolling forward after making contact dead-on with the object ball and "follow" the object ball rather than stopping abruptly.

Top spin is imparted to a ball by hitting it above the midpoint of its vertical plane as it faces the shooter. Top spin is spin in the direction a ball naturally "wants" to take in reaction to friction from contact with the pool cloth. Because of this, a ball sliding on the cloth will rapidly pick up follow. Likewise, a ball struck so that it is spinning backwards (with draw — see below) immediately starts losing that spin, and if it travels far enough, will reach a sliding point (no spin), soon graduating to natural follow.

Follow applied to a non-dead-on shot will cause the angle of departure of the cue ball from the object ball to widen shortly after impact; the thicker the hit on the object ball, the more this effect will be noticeable (on very thin cut shots it practically does not exist). Similarly, top spin will cause a widening of the cue ball's rebound angle after impact with a rail cushion.

Follow also increases the rate of cue ball travel, both before and after object-ball impact, and actually imparts a small amount of draw to the object ball.

=== Force-follow ===
Force-follow is an extreme variation of follow, produced by an imparting as much top-spin as possible, in a forceful shot that employs a long follow-through, as used on a draw shot but above rather than below centre. A straight-on force-follow shot causes the cue ball to hesitate for a split second (rebounding from impact), then charge forward again, due to the forward spin it still retains. It may also refuse a normal rebound from the rail by striking the same rail a second time, due to the forward spin's friction overcoming the rebound. This shot is useful both in trick shots and in positional play.

== Draw ==
Draw, sometimes called back-spin or "bottom" in the U.K., is backward spin applied to the cue ball by hitting it below the midpoint of its vertical plane as it faces the shooter. If the cue ball is hit with draw, and if that spin remains on the cue ball at the moment of impact with an object ball, the cue ball will reverse direction on a dead-on or center-to-center hit, and "draw" backwards.

Draw applied to a non-dead-on shot will cause the angle of departure of the cue ball from the object ball to narrow shortly after impact. Similarly, it will cause a narrowing of the cue ball's rebound angle after impact with a rail cushion.

Draw can also be used to slow the rate of cue ball travel as a result of increased friction between the cloth and the cue ball, and reduce the risk of having the cueball roll off line if the table is not level. This is often called "drag shot" or "drag draw".

A cue ball with back spin can impart a small amount of follow to the object ball. This is often useful in close combination shots to make the first ball struck follow instead of stun after second ball contact.

== Slide ==
"Slide" refers to a cue ball that is sliding across the cloth with no follow or draw spin. To illustrate this principle, if a ball was marked with a single red dot on it which faced the ceiling at the time the cue ball was struck, an observer would see the cue ball traveling with that red dot remaining fixed at the top of the ball, because the bottom of the ball is sliding over the cloth.

In order to initially achieve a sliding cue ball, a middle-ball hit is employed. The more speed with which the cue ball is hit in this manner, the longer the cue ball will slide before picking up natural forward roll from cloth friction. However, because of this tendency of the cue ball to acquire follow from friction, in order to deliver a sliding cue ball to an object ball at a distance, the cue ball must be precisely hit with the necessary degree of draw (back or under spin) so that by the time it reaches the object ball, the draw has dissipated and the cue ball is sliding at the moment of impact.

=== Stop and stun shots ===
When a sliding cue ball contacts an object ball dead-on (a center-to-center hit), the cue ball and object ball are of the same mass, and neither follow nor draw is on the cue ball at the moment of impact, the cue ball will transfer all of its momentum to the object ball and come to a complete stop; this is a stop shot. If the sliding cue ball in the preceding scenario has sidespin on it when it contacts an object ball dead on, it will come to a complete stop but spin in place at that position until the sidespin dissipates. If the cue ball and object ball contact is not dead-on but still very full, the result will often be a "stun" shot, where the cue ball departs the object ball in the expected direction but travels only a short distance. The stun effect can often be enhanced with a minimal amount of draw, to reduce cue ball speed before impact with the object ball.

If a cue ball is sliding, not rolling, at the time it contacts an object ball at an angle (i.e. on a cut shot, not a center-to-center impact), the cue ball will travel in a line tangential to the point of impact between both balls – the tangent line. Because billiard balls are somewhat elastic, the resulting tangent line is slightly less than 90 degrees from perpendicular to a line formed by the contact point between the balls.

If the cue ball hits an object ball at an angle and has follow on it (is spinning forward), the cue ball will first travel on the tangent line and then parabolically arc forward from the tangent line in the direction of cue ball travel. By the same token, when such impact is made and the cue ball has draw (back-spin) on it, the cue ball will first travel on the tangent line and then parabolically arc backward from the tangent line in the opposite direction of cue ball travel. Whether follow or draw is on the cue ball, the faster the cue ball is traveling at the moment of impact, the farther it will travel on the tangent line before arcing forward or backward.

== Throw ==
"Throw" refers to an object ball's motion away from the impact line due to relative sideways sliding motion between the cue ball and object ball caused by sidespin or a cut angle.

When a ball with english (sidespin) on it hits an object ball with a degree of fullness, the object ball will be "thrown" in the opposite direction of the side of the cue ball the english was applied. Thus, a cue ball with left hand english on it will "throw" a hit object ball to the right.

Intermeshing gears in motion; billiard balls in contact behave in a similar manner, due to friction between their surfaces.

This effect is sometimes overarchingly referred to as the "gear system", so-called because of the interaction of the clockwork gears of a clock — each circular gear is interlocked with an abutting circular gear and each spins in the opposite direction of its neighbor in a series. English on the cue ball can cause a very similar effect. If the cue ball with left hand english in the preceding scenario contacts an object ball relatively full and that object ball is frozen to another, the first object ball is thrown to the right and the second to the left, exactly as the name implies.

Throw is also imparted to a ball by collision from a cue ball with no english on it through friction. This is sometimes called "collision-induced throw". The direction of the object ball's throw depends on the cue ball's path immediately before impact. Collision-induced throw "pushes" the object ball in the same direction as the cue ball was traveling before impact. Thus, a cue ball traveling from the left will cause an impacted object ball to be thrown slightly to the left of the OB's natural impact line.

Both varieties of throw are highly influenced by speed. Generally, the less momentum the cue ball possesses at the time of impact, the more that throw will affect the object ball's resultant path of travel.

== Semi-massé ("curve" or "swerve") shot ==
A cue ball can be made to curve in its path of travel with a semi-massé shot. This is usually employed for the purpose of avoiding an interfering ball or balls.

In order to achieve a curve, a player's cue stick must be elevated and the cue ball struck with english. A curve to the left is accomplished by hitting the cue ball with left-hand english, and vice versa for a rightward curve. The higher the elevation of the cue, the more severe the degree of curve. The greater force with which a cue ball is hit the farther it will travel in the direction it was hit before beginning to curve.

Such shots are typically referred to as "curve shots" by North Americans and "swerve shots" by the British (not be confused with the swerve effect, below).

Much steeper curves and even reversal of cue ball direction can be achieved with a massé (below).

== Massé shot ==
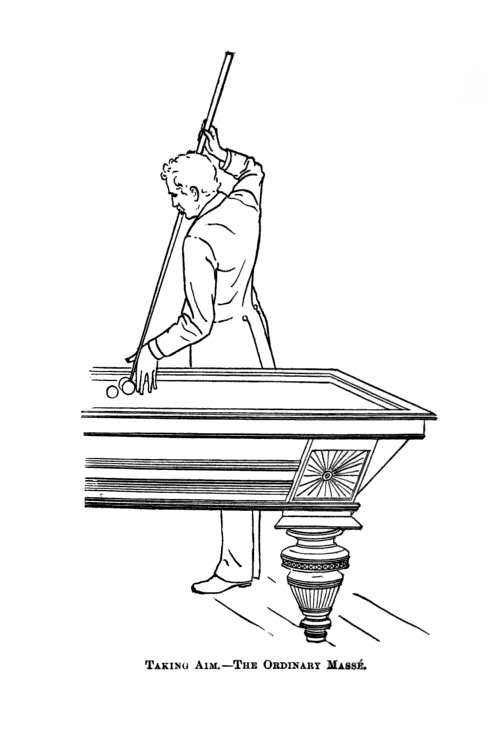
Illustration of a player performing a massé shot.

"Massé" refers to imparting a high degree of spin along the vertical axis and often on the horizontal axis as well, so that the cue ball reverses direction, sharply curves, or both a few moments after being struck without the necessity of ever contacting another ball or rail.

A massé is performed by hitting the cue ball with the butt of the cue stick elevated; usually by 60 degrees or more. While controlling the aim, speed and curve of the cue ball takes a great deal of practice to master, there is a science to it. After the initial contact, the cue ball will travel straight along the path defined by the horizontal alignment of the cue until the cue ball slows enough for the imparted vertical spin to take over. The cue ball will then curve onto a line defined by an angle described by the cue ball's initial resting point on the table and point on the table where the cue tip was aimed. The time before vertical spin overcomes horizontal movement is determined by the force with which the cue ball is struck. Massés are quite difficult for non-experts, and are not allowed in some venues, as the table's cloth can be easily damaged by unskilled players.

A massé shot is an equivalent to the hook technique in ten-pin bowling, used to impart spin on the ball and produce a curving pattern.

== Swerve effect ==
Whenever a pool ball is struck with any degree of english, and with a cue that is not perfectly level, some curve in the ball's path will result. In the two immediately preceding sections, intentional curves of lesser and greater degrees were described. However, because in most billiards shots, the cue is slightly elevated, if english is employed, an unintentional (and often imperceptible to the naked eye) curve results. This is known as "swerve" or "the swerve effect". The farther away an intended target is from the cue ball's original shooting position, the more swerve of the cue ball will affect where the cue ball arrives. For this reason, use of english (and unintentional english) are complicating factors in billiards and swerve must be compensated for. The swerve effect should not be confused with a "swerve shot", previously defined as Commonwealth terminology for a curve shot.

== Deflection (squirt) ==
"Deflection", sometimes referred to as "squirt", is displacement of the cue ball from the aimed direction in the opposite direction of the side to which english was applied. Like the swerve effect, deflection is an unwanted complicating factor, present whenever english is employed.

The physics of deflection has been studied extensively. Basically, when english is used, the cue ball will always begin its travel in a direction not exactly as aimed; it will "squirt" off the line parallel with the cue's direction. Deflection increases the faster the cue stick is traveling at impact and the more english has been applied.

In more detail, deflection occurs when the cue tip strikes the cue ball right or left of the vertical axis. When the cue tip strikes the cue ball off the vertical axis, the cue ball will deviate from what would seem to be the obvious path once the cue tip strikes the cue ball. The reason this occurs and how much the ball deviates from what seems like the obvious path is dependent on many factors that the player must be aware of to properly adjust the line of aim while using side-spin. The most impactful of factors is the front-end weight of the cue stick. What is actually causing the squirt to occur is the off-center hit on a spherical object from a linear source of energy. As the energy of the cue stick is imparted to the cue ball from the tip of the cue stick, it is actually making contact with an angled surface when the cue ball is struck off-center. The more off-center the hit, the more angle the cue tip encounters. As a result, when the tip strikes the cue ball, it imparts forward energy and a degree of energy directed left or right— a nudging-to-the-side effect. The left or right energy serves to push the cueball off the line just a little bit while most of the energy is distributed forward. A cue stick with less front end mass will naturally serve to minimize the left or right energy imparted on the cue ball thus reducing the amount of squirt realized on the shot. To really dig into the physics behind why squirt takes place, students from the University of Colorado's physics department wrote a detailed paper explaining the math behind what is taking place.

Deflection can be decreased by the type of cue used, and at high levels, players will often select a personal playing cue (or a primary shooting shaft for one) based on the amount of squirt it imparts (the less the better). Various manufacturers since the late 1990s have developed low-deflection shafts which flex slightly upon impact, to absorb some of this sideways momentum and prevent imparting it to the cue ball. These are essentially opposite the rigid shafts designed for breaking and for jump shots, which are intended to impart all available force into the cue ball.

Because swerve and deflection (for separate reasons) each cause the cue ball to take a different path than aimed, but each does so in the opposite direction of the other, under the right conditions swerve and deflection can cancel each other out. Aim-and-pivot techniques, such as Backhand English, use this cancellation by pivoting the cue around the bridge hand to compensate for deflection and swerve.

== Jump shot ==
A "jump shot" describes any shot where the cue ball is intentionally driven into the air in a legal manner. It is not permissible in some games (e.g. snooker, blackball, and Russian pyramid) and may be frowned upon or even forbidden in some venues as attempts at it by unskilled players may cause damage to a table's cloth. A legal jump shot requires that the cue ball be struck above center, driving it down into the table, so that the slightly elastic ball will leave the table surface on a rebound. All authoritative rule sources deem it illegal to "scoop" under the cue ball with the tip of the cue to fling it into the air (technically because it is illegal to contact the cue ball with the ferrule of the cue, and because the cue ball is struck twice in rapid succession on such a move, both of which are classic fouls).

Unintentional small jumps are ubiquitous to billiards. In most billiards shots, a player's cue is slightly elevated. Whenever a ball is struck with an elevated cue with much force, a jump, no matter how slight, occurs. An oft-used way to illustrate this principle is to lay a coin on the table approximately an inch in front of the cue ball. When shot very softly, the player will audibly hear the coin being struck and see the cue ball's reaction to that collision. When the same shot is performed with any degree of speed no sound or collision is evident, and it is clear that the coin is being jumped.

== Drag ==
The drag shot is a finesse stroke (usually over a long distance, often the full length of the table) where just enough backspin is applied to the cueball so that it will expire moments before contact with the object ball and finally roll with neither backspin nor topspin at a slow pace. The cueball skims over the surface thus negating any nap or deformation (pilling) of the cloth and keeps a straight trajectory, up until the point where the spin wears off and the cueball rolls naturally. The great advantage of the finessed drag shot is that it allows great control of aim on less than perfect surfaces and delivers contact on the originally intended trajectory. Willie Smith was a master of the drag shot.
