= Mike Massey =

American pool player (born 1947)

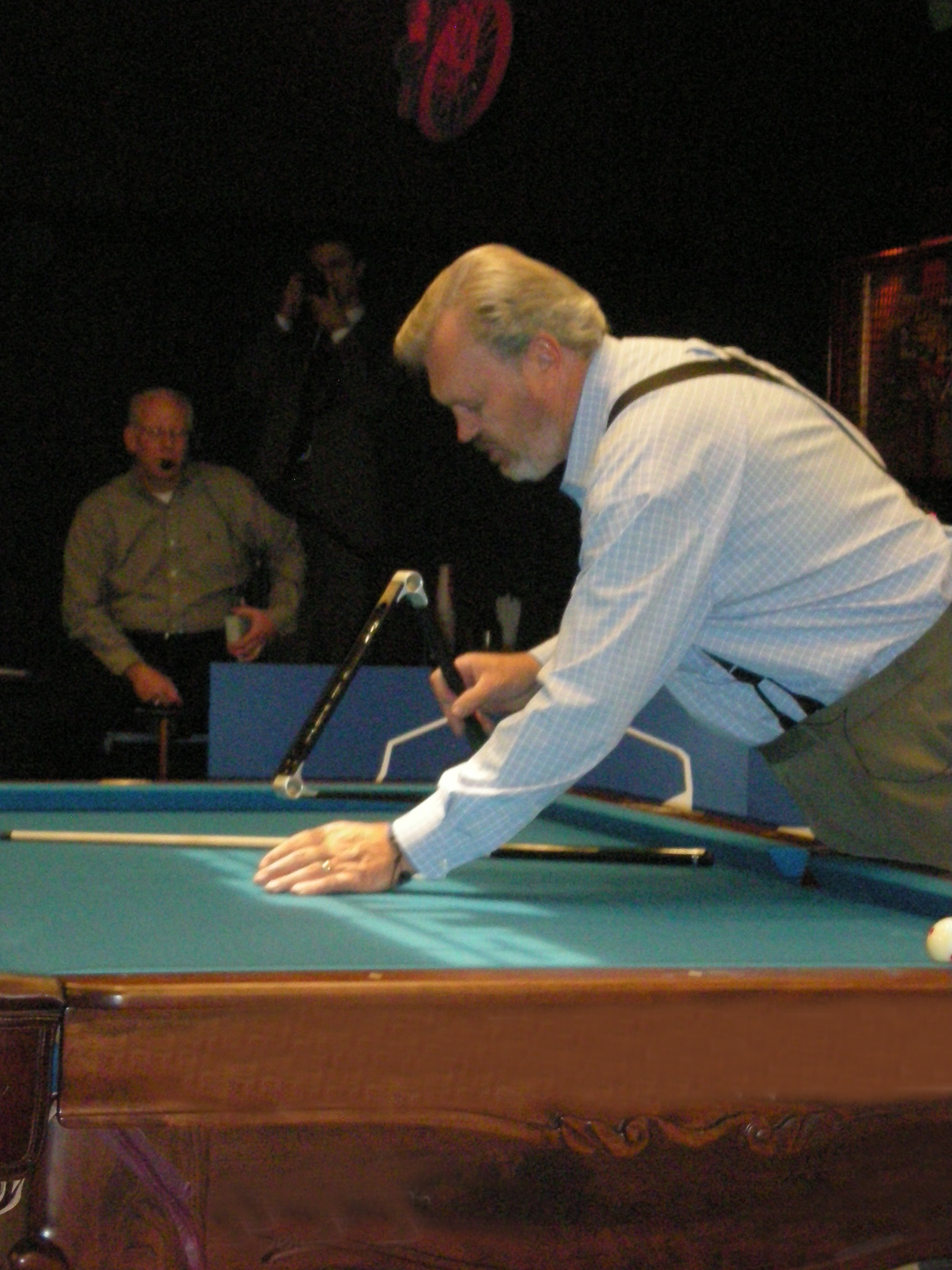
- Massey setting up a trick shot

Personal information
- Nickname: "Tennessee Tarzan"
- Born: 9 April 1947 (age 79) Loudon, Tennessee, U.S.

Pool career
- Country: United States

Tournament wins
- World Champion: Artistic Pool (2000, 2002, 2003, 2005); Snooker Trickshot (1992, 1997, 2005)

Michael Massey (born April 9, 1947), professionally known as Mike Massey, is an American professional pool player. From 1989 to 1991 he served as a contributing editor of The Snap Magazine. Massey was born in Loudon, Tennessee, and for several years lived in Chattanooga, Tennessee, where he owned a pool hall. He has the nickname of "Tennessee Tarzan", but he now lives in Midway, Utah.

Massey was inducted into the Hall of Fame of the Billiard Congress of America on April 7, 2005. For 2007 he was ranked as #8 in Pool & Billiard Magazine's poll of the "Fans' Top 20 Favorite Players".

== World Trickshot Championship ==
In 1991, Massey took part in the inaugural World Trickshot Championship in the United Kingdom and despite not winning the event, demonstrated his skills in a special "duel" against the former World Snooker Champion Steve Davis before a live audience, hosted by TV personality Jeremy Beadle. Massey also demonstrated his ability to impart spin onto a ball with his hand, throwing cue balls from the baulk end of the 12-foot-long snooker table, which would then curve around and travel behind the black spot to pocket (snooker term: pot) a red ball placed in front of the top righthand pocket, without the cue ball touching a cushion. Massey used props and illusion as an integral part of his routine, such as two balls bonded together, magic props and card tricks. In the words of the 1991 World Trickshot Champion Terry Griffiths: "I feel quite embarrassed to have won actually; Mike Massey is miles ahead of the rest of us. I think it was maybe a touch of nerves that put him off tonight." Massey would go on to win the event in later years.

== Titles & achievements ==
- 2024 Artistic Pool Hall of Fame
- 2008 World Cup of Trick Shots
- 2006 Trick Shot Magic Championship
- 2005 Billiard Congress of America Hall of Fame
- 2005 WPA World Artistic Pool Championship
- 2005 World Snooker Trickshot Championship
- 2004 Trick Shot Magic Championship
- 2004 Hard Times 9-Ball Open
- 2003 Trick Shot Magic Championship
- 2003 WPA World Artistic Pool Championship
- 2002 BCA North American Artistic Pool Championship
- 2002 WPA World Artistic Pool Championship
- 2001 Trick Shot Magic Championship
- 2000 BCA North American Artistic Pool Championship
- 2000 World Pool Masters Trick Shot Challenge
- 2000 WPA World Artistic Pool Championship
- 2000 Trick Shot Magic Championship
- 1997 World Snooker Trickshot Championship
- 1997 Senior Nine-ball Masters Championship
- 1996 Mosconi Cup
- 1996 Dutch National Eight-ball Championship
- 1993 World Snooker Trickshot Championship
- 1984 Sylacauga Open 9-Ball
- 1982 Classic Cup 9-Ball

== Records ==
- 11,230 balls pocketed in marathon shooting (24 hours)
- 8,090 balls pocketed in marathon shooting with one arm (24 hours)
- 330 racks of nine-ball run on live television (24 hours)

Inaugural champion	WPA World Artistic Pool Champion; 2000	Succeeded by Charles Darling
Preceded by Charles Darling	WPA World Artistic Pool Champion; 2002 and 2003	Succeeded by Lukasz Szywala
Preceded by Lukasz Szywala	WPA World Artistic Pool Champion; 2005	Succeeded by Tom Rossman
