= Draper (surname) =

Draper is a surname, taken from the occupation (a draper was a merchant in cloth or dry goods). It is the 1365th most common name in the US, with approximately 22,383.

== People ==
Notable people with the surname include:

- Albert Draper (1897–1963), Canadian politician
- Brian Draper (born 1990), perpetrator, murder of Cassie Jo Stoddart
- Charles Draper (musician) (1869–1952), British clarinetist, teacher
- Charles Stark Draper (1901–1987), American engineer, after whom the Charles Stark Draper Laboratory, formerly part of MIT, is named
- Christopher Draper (1892–1979), British flying ace, secret agent, and film star
- Daniel Draper (1841–1931), meteorologist
- Daniel Draper (1940–2004), American attorney and member of the Oklahoma House of Representatives
- Dave Draper (1942–2021), American bodybuilder
- Derek Draper (1967–2024), British political lobbyist, spin doctor, editor of LabourList website, journalist, psychotherapist
- Dexter W. Draper (1881–1961), American college basketball and football coach
- Dontaye Draper (born 1984), American basketball player
- Dorothy Draper (1889–1969), American interior decorator
- Dorothy Catherine Draper (1807–1901), educator and chemist
- Eben Sumner Draper (1858–1914), American politician, governor of Massachusetts
- Foy Draper (1911–1943), American athlete
- Francis Collier Draper (1837–1894), Chief Constable of Toronto
- Fred W. Draper (1868–1962), American politician
- Hal Draper (1914–1990), American socialist author
- Haydn Draper (1889–1934), clarinetist, military and orchestral player, teacher
- Henry Draper (1837–1882), American doctor, pioneer of astrophotography, brother of John Christopher Draper and son of John William Draper
- Herbert James Draper (1863–1920), English painter
- Jack Draper (cinematographer) (1892–1962), American cinematographer
- Jack Draper (born 2001), British tennis player
- James Draper (disambiguation), multiple people
- John Draper (disambiguation), multiple people
- Kris Draper (born 1971), Canadian ice hockey player
- Margaret Green Draper (1727–c. 1804), American printer during the American Revolutionary War
- Mary Draper (1719–1810), participant in the American Revolutionary War
- Nicholas Draper (retired 2020), British historian, inaugural director of the Centre for the Study of the Legacies of British Slavery at University College London
- Nicholas Draper, British Labour Party candidate in several local elections since 1990, most recently the 1990 Merton London Borough Council election
- Paul Draper (disambiguation), multiple people
- Peter Draper (disambiguation), multiple people
- Polly Draper (born 1955), American actress, writer, producer, and director
- Ray Draper (1940–1982), American jazz musician
- Richard Draper (1857–1938), bassoonist, Queen's Hall Orchestra, D’Oyle Carte and Carl Rosa Opera companies
- Robert Draper (born 1959), American author
- Ronald Draper (cricketer) (1926–2025), South African cricketer
- Ronald Draper (basketball) (born 1967), American basketball player
- Ross Draper (born 1988), English footballer
- Ruth Draper (1884–1956), American actress
- Scott Draper (born 1974), Australian tennis player and golfer
- Theodore Draper (1912–2006), American historian and political writer
- Timothy C. Draper (born 1958), American venture capitalist
- Thomas Draper (disambiguation): multiple people
- Trish Draper (born 1959), Australian politician
- Warren Fales Draper (1883–1970), U.S. Deputy Surgeon General and member of Eisenhower's staff during WWII
- Warren Fales Draper (publisher) (1818–1905), publisher in Andover, Massachusetts, philanthropist
- Wickliffe Draper (1891–1972), American segregationist, eugenicist and philanthropist; founded the Pioneer Fund
- William Draper (disambiguation): multiple people

== Fictional characters with the surname ==
In Mad Men:

- Anna Draper, Lt. Donald Draper's wife
- Betty Draper, Don Draper's first wife
- Bobby Draper, Don Draper's elder son
- Don Draper, the protagonist of Mad Men
- Gene Draper, Don Draper's younger son
- Megan Draper, Don Draper's second wife
- Sally Draper, Don Draper's daughter

In other media:

- Roberta "Bobbie" Draper, from The Expanse
