= Draper (disambiguation) =

A draper is a cloth merchant.

Draper or Drapers may also refer to:

== Places ==
=== United States ===
- Draper, Kentucky
- Draper Village, North Carolina, now consolidated into Eden
- Draper, South Dakota
- Draper, Texas
- Draper, Utah
  - Draper station (FrontRunner)
  - Draper Town Center station
- Draper, Virginia
- Draper, Wisconsin
  - Draper (community), Wisconsin
- Draper Island (Michigan)
- Lake Stanley Draper, a reservoir near Oklahoma City, Oklahoma

=== Elsewhere ===
- Draper, Alberta, Canada
- Draper, Queensland, Australia
- Draper railway station, Adelaide, Australia
- Draper (crater), on the Moon

== Businesses and organisations ==
- Draper Corporation, former American power loom manufacturer
- Draper Correctional Facility, an Alabama state prison 1939–2018
- Draper Fisher Jurvetson, formerly Draper Associates, a venture capital firm
- Draper Laboratory, an American not-for-profit research and development organization
- Draper Tools, a British distributor of tools
- Worshipful Company of Drapers, a livery company of the City of London

== Other uses ==
- Draper (surname), including a list of people and fictional characters with the name
- Drapers (magazine), a magazine for fashion retailers

== See also ==
- Drapery, cloths or textiles
