= Daniel Draper (meteorologist) =

American meteorologist and inventor

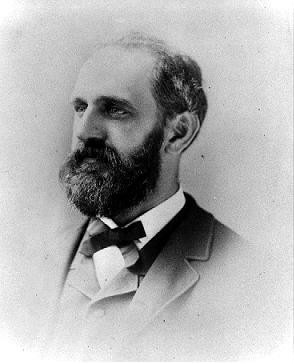
- Born: 2 April 1841; New York City, US
- Died: 21 December 1931 (aged 90); Hastings-on-Hudson, New York, US
- Education: New York University
- Known for: inventing multiple key weather measurement devices
- Scientific career
- Fields: meteorology
- Workplaces: New York Meteorological Observatory

Daniel Draper (2 April 1841 – 21 December 1931) was an American meteorologist and inventor who served for more than forty-two years as the official meteorologist for the city of New York and who attained worldwide distinction in the fields of science relating to astronomy and the weather.

== Early life ==
He was born in Manhattan in 1841, one of six children of the English scientist, philosopher, physician, chemist, historian, and pioneer photographer John William Draper and Antonia Caetana de Paiva Pereira née Gardner. Daniel Draper began his schooling at the NYU primary department, but was mainly homeschooled by his aunt Dorothy Catherine Draper and studied science with his father. Later as his father's assistant in chemistry and physiology, he prepared the amanuensis for his father's Intellectual Development of Europe and other works. Draper attended New York University, of which his father was a founder, and took his Ph.D. there in 1880. He was unable to serve during the American Civil War because he was partially deaf from having scarlet fever as a child.

== Career ==
Draper established the New York Meteorological Observatory in Central Park in 1868 and was its first and only Director until 1911. Draper also invented a number of important weather measurement devices including a self-recording wind direction and velocity instruments, self-recording dry and wet bulb thermometers, a hygrograph, a self-recording rain gauge, a sun thermometer, and a weighing mercurial barograph, thus beginning the 150-plus-year Central Park climatological record that continues to this day. He helped his brother Henry Draper to construct the telescopes, grind the mirrors and build his observatory at Hastings-on-Hudson. He was for many years an official of the New York Health Department.

Among others, he corresponded with such prominent scientists as Cleveland Abbe, Alexander Graham Bell, James McKeen Cattell, Gustave Eiffel, Valentine Mott, Charles Piazzi Smyth, and John Tyndall.

== Personal life ==
His niece was Antonia Maury, the American astronomer, while his brothers included the chemist and surgeon John Christopher Draper and the doctor and amateur astronomer Henry Draper. His aunt was Dorothy Catherine Draper, the subject of the oldest daguerreotype taken in America.

Daniel Draper died of heart disease in 1931 at the Draper family home in Hastings-on-Hudson, New York. He was buried with his wife Nancy Maury née Ludlow in Sleepy Hollow Cemetery, Sleepy Hollow in Westchester County in New York. Their daughter Harriett Maury Draper (1890-1932) was killed in a motor accident. In her will she left her estate to her caretaker to look after her pets. Another daughter was Dorothy Catherine Draper (1888-1972), named after her great-aunt, and who married Berthold Hintz Nye (1886-1943). His only son, John William, named for his grandfather (1893-1976), who married Lulu Hazel Clay (1894-1990) had 3 sons. He achieved his Ph.D. in 1920 from Harvard and was awarded a Guggenheim Fellowship 1927-28 in London. He was Professor Emeritus of English at West Virginia University as well as a prolific author of Shakespeare, Milton and Funeral Elegies.

The archive of Daniel Draper is among the John William Draper Family Papers held by the Library of Congress.
