= John Draper (disambiguation) =

John Draper (born 1943) is an American computer hacker and phone phreaker who used the pseudonym "Captain Crunch."

John Draper may also refer to:

- John Christopher Draper (1835–1885), American chemist, a son of John William Draper and brother of Henry Draper
- John William Draper (1811–1882), American (English-born) scientist, philosopher, physician, chemist, historian and photographer
- John Draper (motorcyclist) (1939–2002), English professional motorcycle racer
