= James Draper =

James Draper may refer to:

- James T. Draper Jr. (born 1935), former Southern Baptist Convention President
- James Draper (settler) (1618–1697), settler of the Massachusetts Bay Colony
- Jim Draper (James W. Draper, 1925–2006), Scottish golfer
- James Draper (umpire) (1925–2013), South African cricket umpire
- Bull Draper (James Draper), American football player and coach

== See also ==
- Draper (surname)
