= Dorothy Catherine Draper =

Artist, educator and chemist

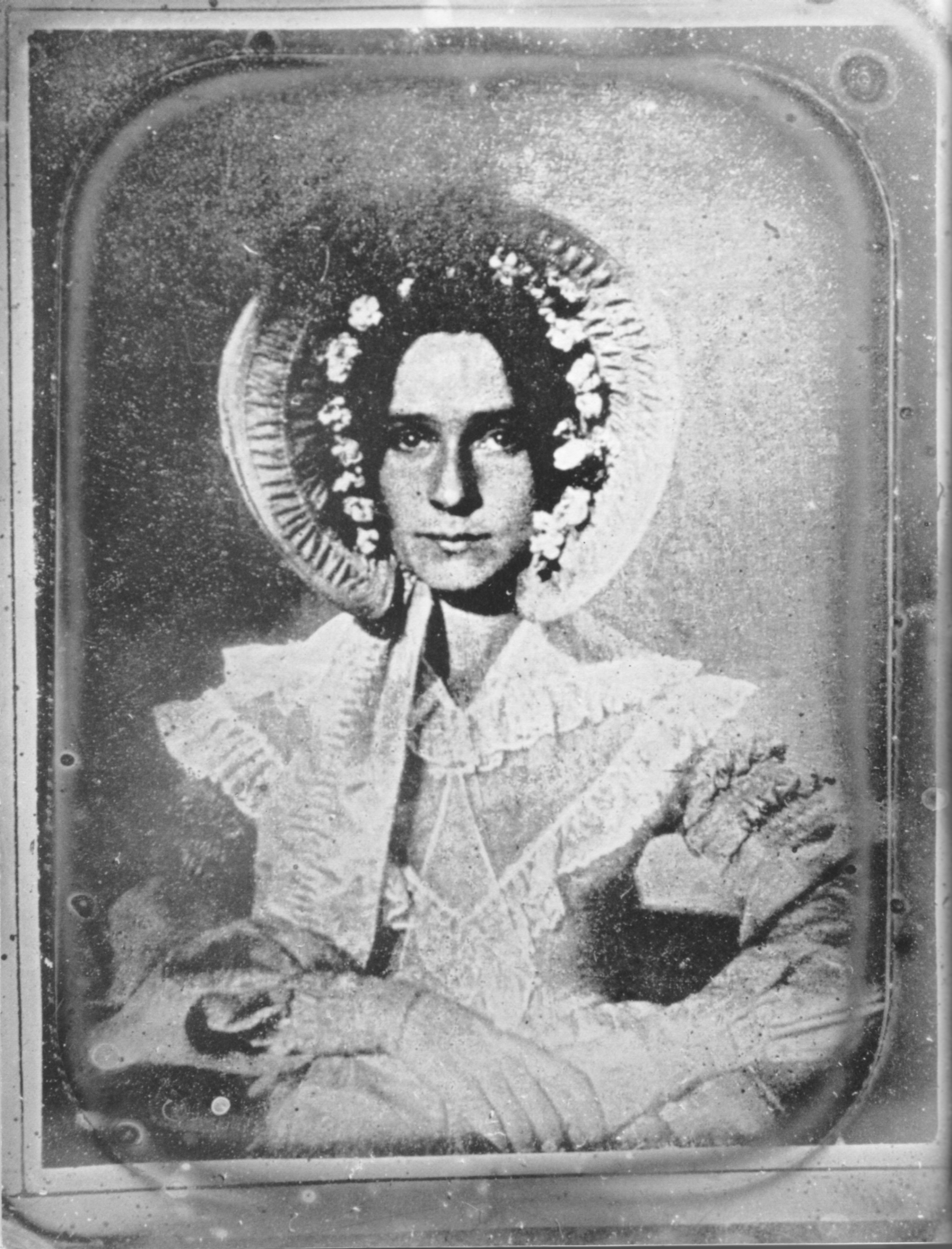
- Daguerreotype of Draper taken by her brother John William Draper, c. 1840
- Born: 6 August 1807; St Helens, Lancashire, England
- Died: 10 December 1901 (aged 94); Hastings-on-Hudson, New York, U.S.
- Burial place: Green-Wood Cemetery
- Known for: Subject of the earliest existent daguerreotype portrait made in the U.S.
- Relatives: John William Draper (brother); John Christopher Draper (nephew); Henry Draper (nephew); Daniel Draper (nephew); Antonia Maury (great-niece)

Dorothy Catherine Draper (6 August 1807–10 December 1901) was an artist, educator and chemist notable for being the subject of the earliest existent daguerreotype portrait made in the United States.

== Early life ==
Dorothy Catherine Draper was born 6 August 1807 in St. Helens, Lancashire in England, to John Christopher Draper (1777–1829), a Wesleyan clergyman and Sarah (née Ripley) Draper (1773–1834). She was baptised on 2 November 1807 by Revd. Dr. Thomas Coke. She had two sisters, Elizabeth Johnson and Sarah Ripley, and a brother, the scientist, philosopher, physician, chemist, historian, and photographer John William Draper. Her father often needed to move the family while serving various congregations throughout England.

Following her father's death in Kent in February 1829, Dorothy moved with her mother and siblings to the US state of Virginia, where her brother John hoped to acquire a teaching position at a local Methodist college.

== Move to America ==
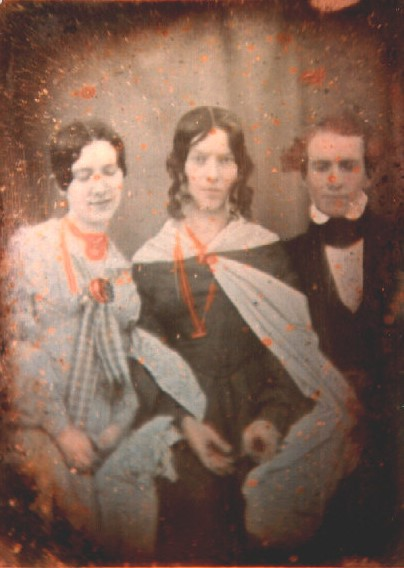
Daguerreotype believed to show Dorothy Catherine Draper (center) in December 1839, taken by John William Draper. The man is probably Drapers assistant, William Henry Goode.

In 1832 the Draper family settled in Mecklenburg County, Virginia, 7 miles (11 km) east of Christiansville (now Chase City). Although he arrived too late to obtain the prospective teaching position, John William Draper established a laboratory in Christiansville. Here he conducted experiments and published eight papers before entering medical school. Dorothy Catherine Draper provided financial support for his medical education by giving drawing and painting lessons. In March 1836, John graduated from the University of Pennsylvania School of Medicine. That same year, he began teaching at Hampden–Sydney College in Virginia. Dorothy became the life-long assistant to her brother, sharing his interests in scientific research and "rendering him valuable aid." The coloured plates that illustrate her brother's memoirs are her work. In addition, she homeschooled his children, several of whom went on to successful careers in scientific research.

== Early photographic subject ==
John William Draper made several important innovations in photochemistry, which improved on Louis Daguerre's process and helped establish portrait photography as a viable practice. During this period he produced clear photographs that were regarded as the first life photographs of a human face. Draper took a series of pictures, with a 65-second exposure in sunlight, in his Washington Square studio at New York University in 1839 or 1840, within the first year of Louis Jacques Mande Daguerre's announcement in Paris of his invention of the daguerreotype process. The first ones, of a female assistant whose face was covered with a thin layer of flour to increase contrast, were not preserved. At this time, no later than July 1840, Draper also photographed his sister, Dorothy Catherine Draper, who was required to pose unblinking for a 65-second exposure with her face also dusted with white flour to enhance the contrast, and one of those pictures (see image above) became known to the public via the letter which Draper sent to John Herschel in 1840. Several copies were made of this picture in the 19th century, and the photograph attached with Draper's letter was also likely a copy made by Draper himself.

== Family ==
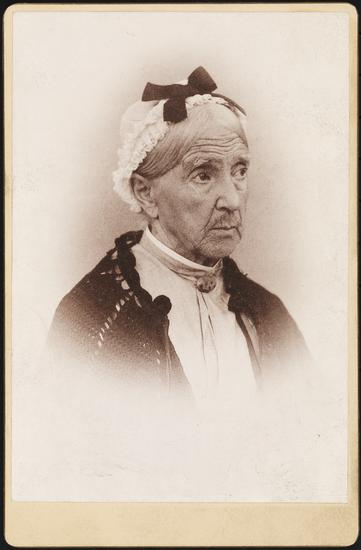
Dorothy Catherine Draper in the 1890s

When her brother's wife Antonia Caetana de Paiva Pereira (née Gardner, c. 1814 – 1870) became ill, Dorothy Draper was as a mother to their children. She devoted her life to supporting her brother in his work and helping to raise and homeschool his children.

Her great-niece was Antonia Maury, the American astronomer, while her nephews included the chemist and surgeon John Christopher Draper, the doctor and amateur astronomer Henry Draper and the meteorologist Daniel Draper. The latter named his daughter Dorothy Catherine Draper (1888–1972) after her.

== Death ==
Dorothy Catherine Draper died in December 1901 aged 94 at the Draper family home at Hastings-on-Hudson, New York and was buried with her brother and sister-in-law in Green-Wood Cemetery in Brooklyn, New York. She never married.
