= Charles Draper =

Charles Draper may refer to:

- Charles Draper (musician) (1869–1952), British classical clarinetist
- Charles Stark Draper (1901–1987), American scientist and engineer
