= Henry Draper Catalogue =

Astronomical star catalogue

- Named after: Henry Draper
- Related media on Commons

The Henry Draper Catalogue (HD) is an astronomical star catalogue published between 1918 and 1924, giving spectroscopic classifications for 225,300 stars; it was later expanded by the Henry Draper Extension (HDE), published between 1925 and 1936, which gave classifications for 46,850 more stars, and by the Henry Draper Extension Charts (HDEC), published from 1937 to 1949 in the form of charts, which gave classifications for 86,933 more stars. In all, 359,083 stars were classified as of August 2017.

The HD catalogue is named after Henry Draper, an amateur astronomer, and covers the entire sky almost completely down to an apparent photographic magnitude of about 9; the extensions added fainter stars in certain areas of the sky. The construction of the Henry Draper Catalogue was part of a pioneering effort to classify stellar spectra, and its catalogue numbers are commonly used as a way of identifying stars.

== History ==
The origin of the Henry Draper Catalogue dates back to the earliest photographic studies of stellar spectra. Henry Draper made the first photograph of a star's spectrum showing distinct spectral lines when he photographed Vega in 1872. He took over a hundred more photographs of stellar spectra before his death in 1882. In 1885, Edward Pickering began to supervise photographic spectroscopy at Harvard College Observatory, using the objective prism method. In 1886, Draper's widow, Mary Anna Palmer Draper, became interested in Pickering's research and agreed to fund it under the name Henry Draper Memorial. Pickering and his coworkers then began to take an objective-prism survey of the sky and to classify the resulting spectra.

Classifications in the Draper Catalogue of Stellar Spectra
Secchi	Draper	Comment
I	A, B, C, D	Hydrogen lines dominant
II	E, F, G, H, I, J, K, L	
III	M	
IV	N	Did not appear in the catalogue
—	O	Wolf–Rayet spectra with bright lines
—	P	Planetary nebulae
—	Q	Other spectra

A first result of this work was the Draper Catalogue of Stellar Spectra, published in 1890. This catalogue contained spectroscopic classifications for 10,351 stars, mostly north of declination −25°. Most of the classification was done by Williamina Fleming. The classification scheme used was to subdivide the previously used Secchi classes (I to IV) into more specific classes, given letters from A to N. Also, the letter O was used for stars whose spectra consisted mainly of bright lines, the letter P for planetary nebulae, and the letter Q for spectra not fitting into any of the classes A through P. No star of type N appeared in the catalogue, and the only star of type O was the Wolf–Rayet star HR 2583.

Antonia Maury and Pickering published a more detailed study of the spectra of bright stars in the northern hemisphere in 1897. Maury used classifications numbered from I to XXII; groups I to XX corresponded to subdivisions of the Draper Catalogue types B, A, F, G, K, and M, while XXI and XXII corresponded to the Draper Catalogue types N and O. She was the first to place B stars in their current position, prior to A stars, in the spectral classification.

In 1890, the Harvard College Observatory constructed the Boyden Observatory in Arequipa, Peru in order to study the sky in the Southern Hemisphere, and a study of bright stars in the southern hemisphere was published by Annie Jump Cannon and Pickering in 1901. Cannon used the lettered types of the Draper Catalogue of Stellar Spectra, but dropped all letters except O, B, A, F, G, K, and M, used in that order, as well as P for planetary nebulae and Q for some peculiar spectra. She also used types such as B5A for stars halfway between types B and A, F2G for stars one-fifth of the way from F to G, and so forth.

Between 1910 and 1915, new discoveries increased interest in stellar classification, and work on the Henry Draper Catalogue itself started in 1911. From 1912 to 1915, Cannon and her coworkers classified spectra at the rate of approximately 5,000 per month. The catalogue was published in 9 volumes of the Annals of Harvard College Observatory between 1918 and 1924. It contains rough positions, magnitudes, spectral classifications, and, where possible, cross-references to the Durchmusterung catalogs for 225,300 stars. The classification scheme used was similar to that used in Cannon's 1901 work, except that types such as B, A, B5A, F2G, and so on, had been changed to B0, A0, B5, F2, and so on. As well as the classes O through M, P was used for nebulae and R and N for carbon stars.

Pickering died on February 3, 1919, leaving 6 volumes to be overseen by Cannon. Cannon found spectral classifications for 46,850 fainter stars in selected regions of the sky in the Henry Draper Extension, published in six parts between 1925 and 1936. She continued classifying stars until her death in 1941. Most of these classifications were published in 1949 in the Henry Draper Extension Charts (the first portion of these charts was published in 1937.) These charts also contained some classifications by Margaret Walton Mayall, who supervised the work after Cannon's death.

The catalogue and its extensions were the first large-scale attempt to catalogue spectral types of stars, and its construction led to the Harvard classification scheme of stellar spectra which is still used today.

== Availability and usage ==
Stars contained in the main portion of the catalogue are of medium magnitude, down to about 9^{m} (about 1/15 as bright as the faintest stars visible with the naked eye). The extensions contain stars as faint as the 11th magnitude selected from certain regions of the sky. Stars in the original catalogue are numbered from 1 to 225300 (prefix HD) and are numbered in order of increasing right ascension for the epoch 1900.0. Stars in the first extension are numbered from 225301 to 272150 (prefix HDE), and stars from the extension charts are numbered from 272151 to 359083 (prefix HDEC). However, as the numbering is continuous throughout the catalog and its extensions, the prefix HD may be used regardless as its use produces no ambiguity. Many stars are customarily identified by their HD numbers.

The Henry Draper Catalogue and the Extension were available from the NASA Astronomical Data Center as part of their third CD-ROM of astronomical catalogues. Currently, the Catalogue and Extension are available from the VizieR service of the Centre de Données astronomiques (French for "Astronomical Data Center") at Strasbourg as catalogue number III/135A. Because of their format, putting the Henry Draper Extension Charts into a machine-readable format was more difficult, but this task was eventually completed by 1995 by Nesterov, Röser and their coworkers, and the charts are now available at VizieR as catalogue number III/182.
