= Paul Draper =

Paul Draper may refer to:

- Paul Draper (1854–1922), bassoonist, teacher, military musician, brother of Charles Draper (musician)
- Paul Beaumont Draper (1899–1971), British musician with London Baroque Ensemble, Melos Ensemble, nephew of Charles Draper (musician)
- Paul Draper (dancer) (1909–1996), American dancer
- Paul Draper (winemaker) (born 1936), American winemaker
- Paul Draper (philosopher) (born 1957), American philosopher
- Paul Draper (priest) (born 1964), Church of Ireland Dean of Lismore
- Paul Draper (musician) (born 1970), English singer-songwriter and former Mansun frontman
- Paul Draper (cricketer) (born 1972), English cricketer
- Paul W. Draper (born 1978), American magician, actor, film maker and anthropologist
