= New Symphony Orchestra (London) =

- Orchestra
- Founded: 1905
- Disbanded: c. 1940
- Later name: Royal Albert Hall Orchestra (1915–1928)
- Location: London
- Concert hall: Queen's Hall
- Principal conductor: Thomas Beecham (1906–1908); Landon Ronald (1908–1928)

The New Symphony Orchestra (NSO) was founded in London in 1905 by the clarinettist Charles Draper and the flautist Eli Hudson. After ten years it became the orchestra of the Royal Albert Hall, and continued under that name until 1928, after which it resumed its original name, giving concerts during the 1930s. Thomas Beecham was succeeded as the orchestra's principal conductor by Landon Ronald. With Ronald the orchestra played for the Gramophone Company (HMV) in what were later recognised as the first extensive experiments in symphonic recording, beginning in the days of acoustic recording and continuing into the electrical era.

== History ==
In the early years of the 20th century there was only one permanent orchestra in London – the London Symphony Orchestra (LSO). The orchestras of Covent Garden, the Philharmonic Society and the Queen's Hall were ad hoc ensembles, with players engaged individually for each concert or for a season. Vacancies occurred in the LSO's ranks only rarely, and the clarinettist Charles Draper and the flautist Eli Hudson conceived of a new cooperative, self-governing ensemble of medium size, drawing on the pool of talent available.

Initially, the new orchestra gave Sunday concerts at a theatre in Notting Hill Gate. One of its cello section, Edward Mason, conducted. When the orchestra made its central London début at the Queen's Hall in June 1906, Draper invited the rising young conductor Thomas Beecham to a rehearsal. Beecham and the orchestra approved of each other and he accepted its invitation to become its regular conductor.

Beecham quickly concluded that to compete with London's existing symphony orchestras his forces must be expanded to full symphonic strength and play in larger halls. He and the enlarged New Symphony Orchestra gave concerts at the Queen's Hall, with considerable success, but after 1908 they parted company, disagreeing about artistic control and, in particular, the deputy system. Under this system, orchestral players, if offered a better-paid engagement elsewhere, could send a substitute to a rehearsal or a concert. The treasurer of the Royal Philharmonic Society described it thus:

A, whom you want, signs to play at your concert. He sends B (whom you don't mind) to the first rehearsal. B, without your knowledge or consent, sends C to the second rehearsal. Not being able to play at the concert, C sends D, whom you would have paid five shillings to stay away.

Henry Wood had already banned the deputy system in the Queen's Hall Orchestra but the players of the LSO and the New Symphony Orchestra insisted on retaining it. Orchestral musicians were not highly paid, and removing their chances of better-paid engagements permitted by the deputy system was a serious financial blow to many of them. Beecham disagreed and left, founding an orchestra of his own.

The NSO appointed Landon Ronald as its new chief conductor. He said that it boasted "a set of principal players such as I had never dreamed of". Skilled at musical politics, Ronald engineered the NSO's supplanting of the LSO at the profitable Sunday concerts at the Royal Albert Hall from 1909. He was also musical adviser to the Gramophone Company (HMV), and able to secure recording work for the NSO in preference to the LSO.

The NSO became the Royal Albert Hall Orchestra in 1915 with Ronald as its conductor. For a while the ensemble styled itself with both names, as "the Royal Albert Hall Orchestra (New Symphony Orchestra)". After May 1928, reverting to its original name, the NSO gave concerts between then and the Second World War with conductors including Ronald, Wood and Malcolm Sargent.

== Recordings ==
During the acoustic era the orchestra, under both its names, recorded for HMV. That company's catalogues from 1914 to 1918 include the NSO/Albert Hall Orchestra in music by Beethoven (Egmont and Leonore No. 3 overtures); Debussy (Prélude à l'après-midi d'un faune); Delibes (excerpts from Coppélia and Sylvia); Grieg (Peer Gynt suite); Mendelssohn (A Midsummer Night's Dream music); Rimsky-Korsakov (Scheherazade); Schubert (Symphony No 8 ("Unfinished")); Tchaikovsky (1812 Overture; Suite, The Nutcracker, Marche Slave, Suite No 3); Wagner, (Preludes to The Flying Dutchman, Lohengrin and Tannhaüser; Prelude and orchestral excerpts from Die Meistersinger); and overtures by Auber, Hérold, Mozart, Nicolai, Rossini and Weber. There were several other recordings of light classics, described by the discographer Brian Rust as "truly exquisite"; Rust comments that the HMV recording of Järnefelt's Praeludium is "a remarkably good example of how brilliant acoustic recording could be".

Later, after the introduction of electrical recording, Ronald and the orchestra recorded larger-scale orchestral works, including Beethoven's Fifth, Brahms's Second and Tchaikovsky's Fourth, Fifth and Sixth symphonies. An HMV catalogue for 1926 lists their recordings of concertos by Beethoven, Grieg, Liszt, Mendelssohn, Mozart and Schumann, with soloists including Isolde Menges, Arthur de Greef, Benno Moiseiwitsch, Fritz Kreisler and Alfred Cortot. Fred Gaisberg of HMV wrote that the series of discs by Ronald and the orchestra "were the first extensive experiments in recording a symphony orchestra and opened our eyes to the great field of the masterpieces of Weber, Beethoven, Grieg, Tchaikovsky, Dvořák, etc".

== Post-war NSO ==
A later studio ensemble called the New Symphony Orchestra (sometimes the New Symphony Orchestra of London) – unconnected with the earlier New Symphony Orchestra – played on more than 150 Decca recordings between 1948 and 1964. Conductors included Sargent, Sir Adrian Boult, Colin Davis, Josef Krips, Charles Mackerras, Leopold Stokowski and George Szell. Soloists included Clifford Curzon, Jascha Heifetz, Julius Katchen, Peter Katin, Peter Pears, Arthur Rubinstein, Gérard Souzay and Joan Sutherland. The orchestra played on Decca recordings with the D'Oyly Carte Opera Company between 1953 and 1961.

== Sources ==
- Langley, Leanne (2012). "Joining up the Dots". In Bennett Zon (ed.). Music and Performance Culture in Nineteenth-Century Britain. Abingdon and New York: Routledge. ISBN 978-1-4094-3979-0.
- Lucas, John (2008). Thomas Beecham: An Obsession with Music. Woodbridge: Boydell Press. ISBN 978-1-84383-402-1.
- McVeigh, Simon (2013). "The London Symphony Orchestra: The First Decade Revisited". Journal of the Royal Musical Association. 138 (2): 313–376. doi:10.1080/02690403.2013.830476. JSTOR 4330335. (subscription required)
- Morrison, Richard (2004). Orchestra: The LSO: A Century of Triumph and Turbulence. London: Faber and Faber. ISBN 978-0-57-121584-3.
- Reid, Charles (1961). Thomas Beecham: An Independent Biography. London: Victor Gollancz. OCLC 500565141.
- Russell, Thomas (1945). Philharmonic Decade. London: Hutchinson. OCLC 504109856.
- Stuart, Philip (2009). "Decca Classical, 1929–2009" (PDF). Royal Holloway. University of London.
- Rust, Brian, ed. (1975). Gramophone Records of the First World War – An HMV Catalogue 1914–18. Newton Abbot: David and Charles. ISBN 0-7153-6842-7.
