= Julian Egerton =

English musician

Julian Egerton (24 August 1848 – 22 January 1945) was a British classical clarinetist.

Egerton was born in London. Despite contracting polio at the age of eight, he went on to have a lengthy, productive career, performing until the age of 93. He first studied under his father, William Egerton, and then with George Tyler of the Royal Philharmonic Society. He was the first British clarinetist to perform Brahms' Clarinet Quintet Op. 115. He was professor at the Royal College of Music in succession to Henry Lazarus from 1894 until 1910, and at Kneller Hall from 1889. His students included Charles Draper and Haydn Draper.

When Queen Victoria's State and Private Bands were re-organised in 1870, Julian Egerton took over his father's place, at the age of 22 years, a position he held until 1909. He was, in addition, principal at the Hans Richter Concerts from their inception in 1879, and at many provincial festivals. He played at the first and many subsequent Promenade Concerts at Queens Hall under Henry J. Wood.

In 1910 he gave up both teaching appointments for personal reasons, much to the surprise and regret of the institutions involved.

In 1911 his wife Caroline Wakelin, whom he married in 1872, died. Together they had seven children. He remarried in 1917 and moved shortly after to Bilsington in Kent, where he died, aged 96.

His Fieldhouse clarinets are preserved in the Edinburgh Collection of Historic Musical Instruments.
