= Draper point =

Temperature above which all solids glow due to black-body radiation

Vacuum tube cathode heaters exceeding the Draper point visibly glow.

In physics, the Draper point is the approximate temperature above which almost all solid materials visibly glow as a result of black-body radiation. It was established at 977 °F (525 °C; 798 K) by John William Draper in 1847.

Bodies at temperatures just below the Draper point radiate primarily in the infrared range and emit negligible visible light. The value of the Draper point can be calculated using Wien's displacement law: the peak frequency $\nu_\text{peak}$ (in hertz) emitted by a blackbody relates to temperature as follows:
$$\nu_\text{peak} = 2.821 \frac{kT}{h},$$
where

- k is the Boltzmann constant,
- h is the Planck constant,
- T is temperature (in kelvins).

Substituting the Draper point into this equation produces a frequency of 83 THz, or a wavelength of 3.6 μm, which is well into the infrared and completely invisible to the human eye. One example is a black dwarf, which is a theoretical white dwarf that is cooled to a point so it can no longer produce visible light if the temperature is 797 Kelvin or below. However, the leading edge of the blackbody radiation curve extends, at a small fraction of peak intensity, to the near-infrared and far-red (approximately the range 0.7–1 μm), which are weakly visible as a dull red.

According to the Stefan–Boltzmann law, a black body at the Draper point emits 23 kW of radiation per square meter, almost exclusively infrared.

== See also ==
- Incandescence
