= Henry Draper Observatory =

- U.S. National Register of Historic Places
- U.S. National Historic Landmark
- New York State Register of Historic Places
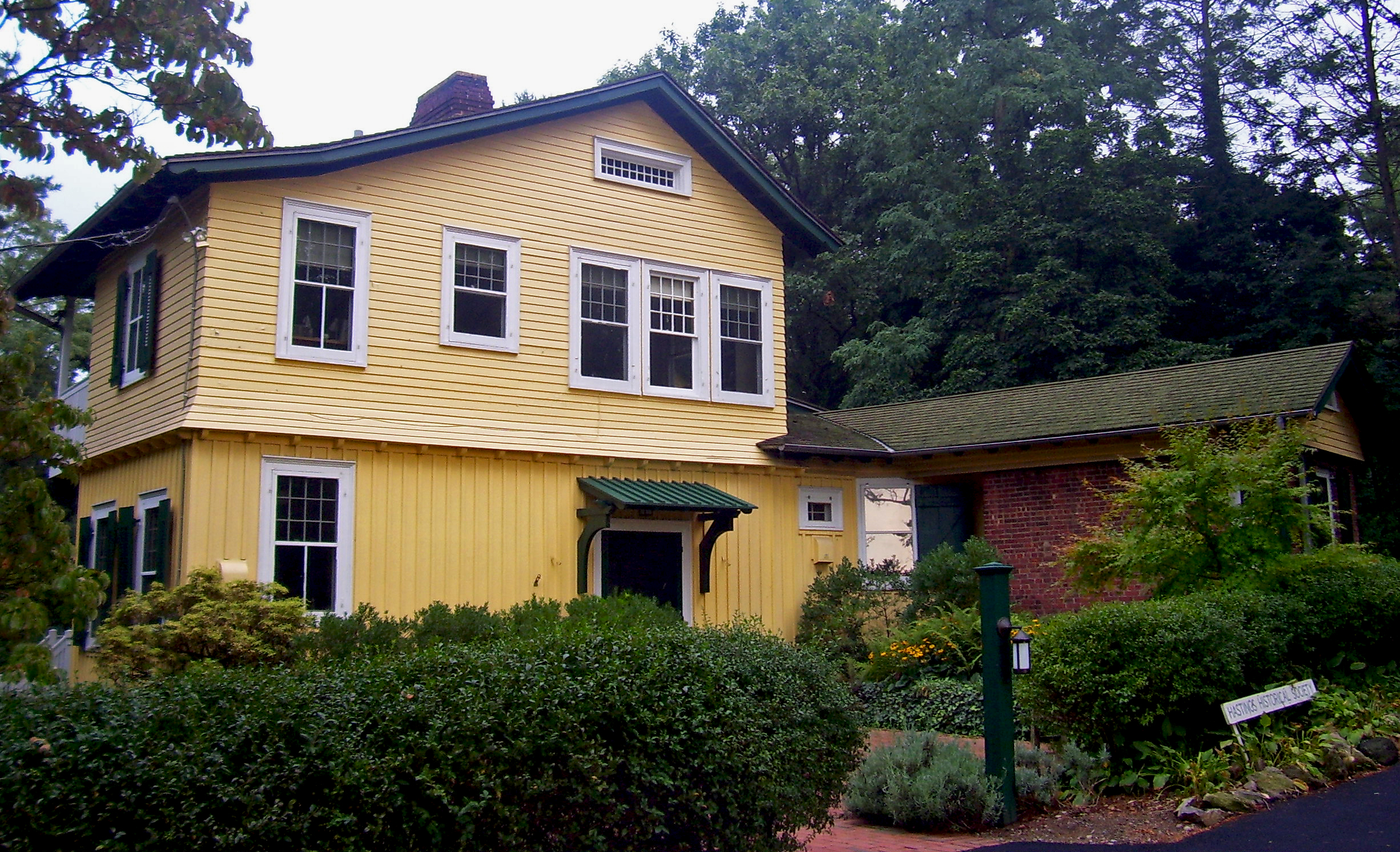
- Front view of building in 2007

- Location within New York Location within the United States
- Location: 407 Broadway, Hastings-on-Hudson, NY
- Coordinates: 40°59′28.6″N 73°52′47.1″W
- Area: less than one acre
- Built: c. 1860
- NRHP reference No.: 75001237
- NYSRHP No.: 11955.000237

Significant dates
- Added to NRHP: May 15, 1975
- Designated NHL: May 15, 1975
- Designated NYSRHP: June 23, 1980

The Henry Draper Observatory, also known as Draper Cottage and incorrectly as the John William Draper House, is a historic house and local history museum in Draper Park off US 9 in Hastings-on-Hudson, New York, United States. Its core is an astronomical observatory built about 1860 for Henry Draper (1837–1882). It was here that he made astrophotography history, taking some of the earliest photographs of the Moon to include identifiable features through a telescope in 1863.

The house was declared a National Historic Landmark in 1975, on the mistaken belief the building was a residence of Henry Draper's father, John William Draper (1811–1882). The elder Draper was in his time a noted scientist, active in a variety of disciplines, who was best remembered for improvements he made to the daguerreotype process of photography. He was influential in his lifetime, and was one of the last generation of general natural scientists before specialization within fields became common.

The observatory was enlarged under Henry Draper's use with a second dome, and passed to his sister Antonia Draper Dixon after his death. The second dome was destroyed by fire in 1905, but was rebuilt by Dixon. The building was reconfigured in 1912 by Dixon for use as her residence, and it remained her home until her death in 1923. The building and the surrounding Henry Draper Park, after protracted decision-making and legal issues, passed to the village of Hastings-on-Hudson, with the stipulation that the building be used as a museum. It is now home to the local historical society.

== See also ==
- List of astronomical observatories
- List of National Historic Landmarks in New York
- National Register of Historic Places listings in southern Westchester County, New York
