= Bull Draper =

American football player and coach

James "Bull" Draper
Playing career
- 1932–1935: Western Maryland
- 1936: Baltimore Orioles
- Positions: Quarterback, halfback

Coaching career (HC unless noted)
- 1939–1941: Mount St. Mary's

James "Bull" Draper was an American football player and coach. He served as the head football coach at Mount St. Mary's College—now known as Mount St. Mary's University–in Emmitsburg, Maryland from 1939 to 1941. Draper played college football at Western Maryland College and professionally for the Baltimore Orioles of the Dixie League.
