= Thomas Draper (disambiguation) =

Thomas Draper (1864–1946) was an Australian politician and judge.

Thomas Draper may also refer to:

- Thomas Draper (criminal) (1839–1883), American professional criminal
- Thomas Draper (died 1703), of the Draper baronets
- Thomas Draper, a name used by Thomas Fermore (died 1609), English MP
- Tom Draper (born 1966), Canadian ice hockey player
