= Draper (crater) =

Crater on the Moon

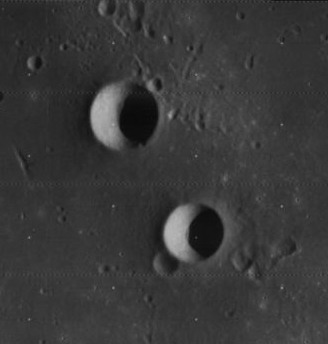
- Lunar Orbiter 4 image of Draper (upper left) and Draper C (lower right)
- Coordinates: 17.6°N 21.7°W
- Diameter: 8.28 km (5.14 mi)
- Depth: 1.76 km (1.09 mi)
- Colongitude: 22° at sunrise
- Eponym: Henry Draper

Draper is a small lunar impact crater in the southern part of the Mare Imbrium. It is a circular, cup-shaped formation, with a tiny craterlet intruding into the northeastern rim. To the north-northeast is the crater Pytheas, and the two are joined by a slender ridge. Just to the southeast is the slightly smaller crater identified as Draper C, and to the south lies the Montes Carpatus range.

This crater is named after American astronomer Henry Draper (1837-1882), a pioneer of astrophotography. His name was introduced into lunar nomenclature by Johann N. Krieger and Rudolf König in 1912. Its designation was officially adopted by the International Astronomical Union in 1935.

== Satellite craters ==
By convention these features are identified on lunar maps by placing the letter on the side of the crater midpoint that is closest to Draper.

Draper	Latitude	Longitude	Diameter
A	17.9° N	23.4° W	8 km
C	17.1° N	21.5° W	4 km
