= Mary Anna Draper =

American astronomer (1839–1914)

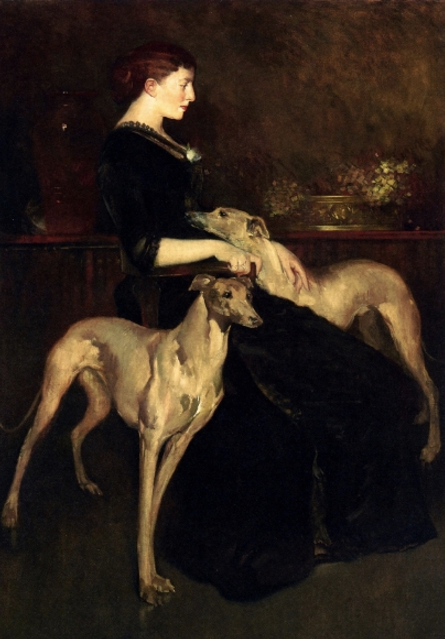
John White Alexander, Mary Anna Palmer Draper (1839-1914), 1888, New York Public Library

Mary Anna Draper, also known as Mary Anna Palmer Draper, (September 19, 1839 – December 8, 1914) (Note: Her date of birth is given as September 11, 1839 in secondary sources, like the American National Biography. Find a Grave, not considered a reliable source, states her date of birth is September 19, 1839 and the date on the photograph of the gravestone shows that date.) was an American, known for her work with her husband, Henry Draper, with astronomical photography and research. She helped found the Mount Wilson Observatory and created an award for astronomical research, the Henry Draper Medal of the National Academy of Sciences.

== Early life ==
Mary Anna Palmer was born in 1839, in Stonington, Connecticut, to Mary Ann Suydam and Courtlandt Palmer. Her father was a merchant and real estate investor. At his death in 1874, he left her and her three brothers a large fortune.

In 1867, she married Henry Draper, a physician and professor of chemistry and physiology at University of the City of New York, now New York University. Particularly interested in astronomical spectroscopy, he was also a skilled amateur astronomer.

== Career ==
Draper developed an interest in astronomy from her husband and the two took the first photographs of the spectrum of a star using a large telescope Henry built at his observatory near their summer home in Hastings-on-Hudson, New York in 1872. The couple traveled to Rawlins, Wyoming to observe a solar eclipse in 1878. During winters, the couple worked in the laboratory connected to their New York City home. For fifteen years, the Drapers worked together on observations, photography, and laboratory work. In the process, she became an expert technician.

After the death of her husband in 1882, she donated her equipment to the Harvard College Observatory, and endowed the Henry Draper Memorial to fund the continuation of her research. Although she no longer actively researched, she visited the observatory regularly to learn about the progress of the research.

The monies that she donated enabled Edward Charles Pickering of the university to classify stars based upon characteristics found in photographs of the spectra of stars. Her influence resulted in women astronomers working at the observatory. These included her niece Antonia Maury, who proposed new ways to classify stellar spectra, and Henrietta Swan Leavitt, whose work on Cepheid variable stars led to their use as important galactic distance indicators.

Mary Anna Draper also created an award for astronomical research, the Henry Draper Medal of the National Academy of Sciences, and helped to found the Mount Wilson Observatory. She hosted scientific lectures and exhibitions at her home laboratory, and continued until her death of pneumonia in 1914 in New York City.

Following her death, a bequest was made in her name to the Metropolitan Museum of Art, giving the Metropolitan her extensive collection of Egyptian artifacts, Classical antiquities, tapestries, 22 miniature paintings, and other works of art. She also made a bequest supporting continued research at Harvard Observatory.
