= Draper =

Retailer or wholesaler of cloth

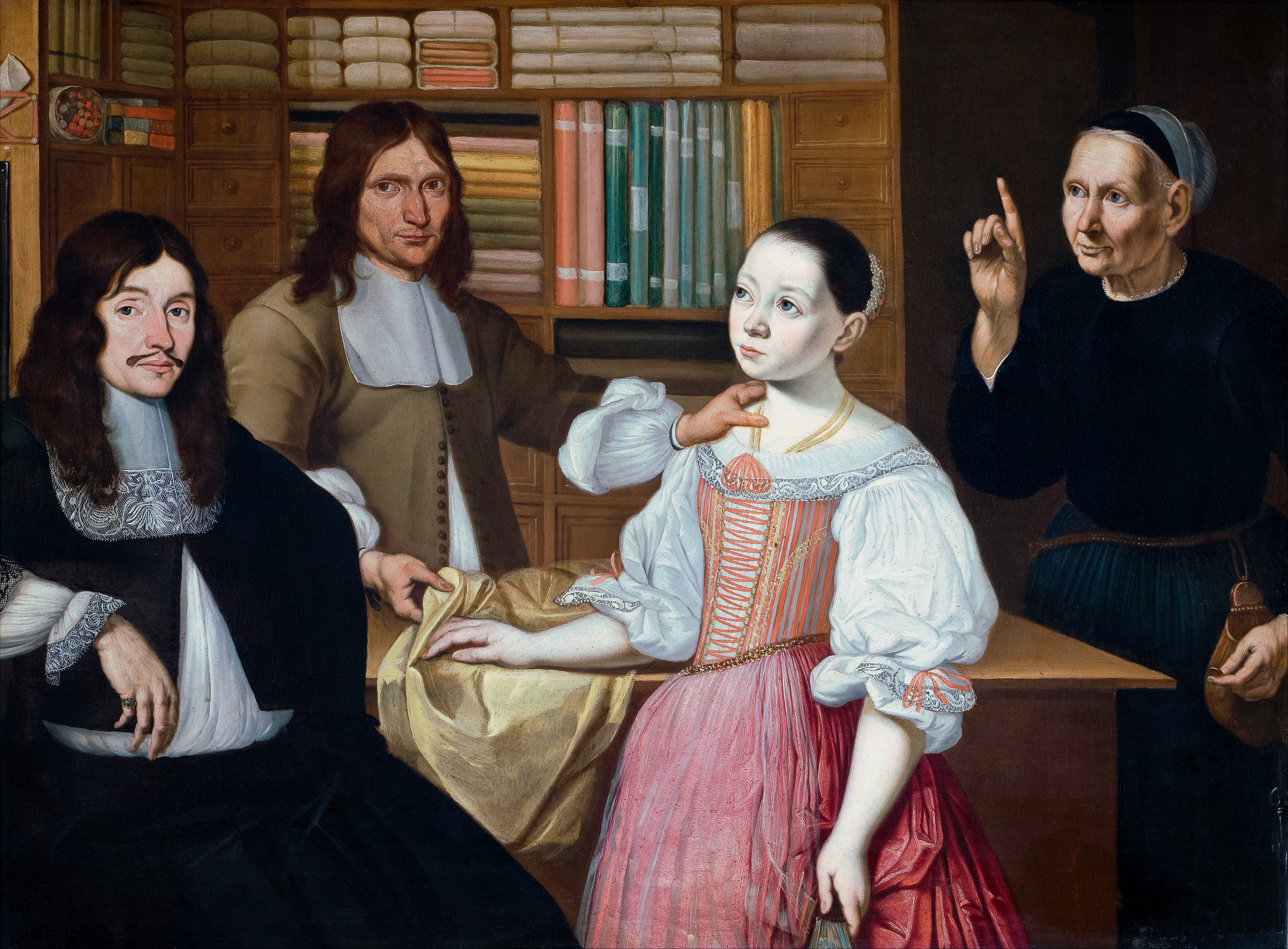
In the Draper's Shop by Adriaen van Bloemen

Draper was originally a term for a retailer or wholesaler of cloth that was mainly for clothing. A draper may additionally operate as a cloth merchant or a haberdasher.

== History ==
Drapers were an important trade guild during the medieval period, when the sellers of cloth operated out of drapers' shops. However the original meaning of the term has now largely fallen out of use.

In 1724, Jonathan Swift wrote a series of satirical pamphlets in the guise of a draper called the Drapier's Letters.

== Historical drapers ==
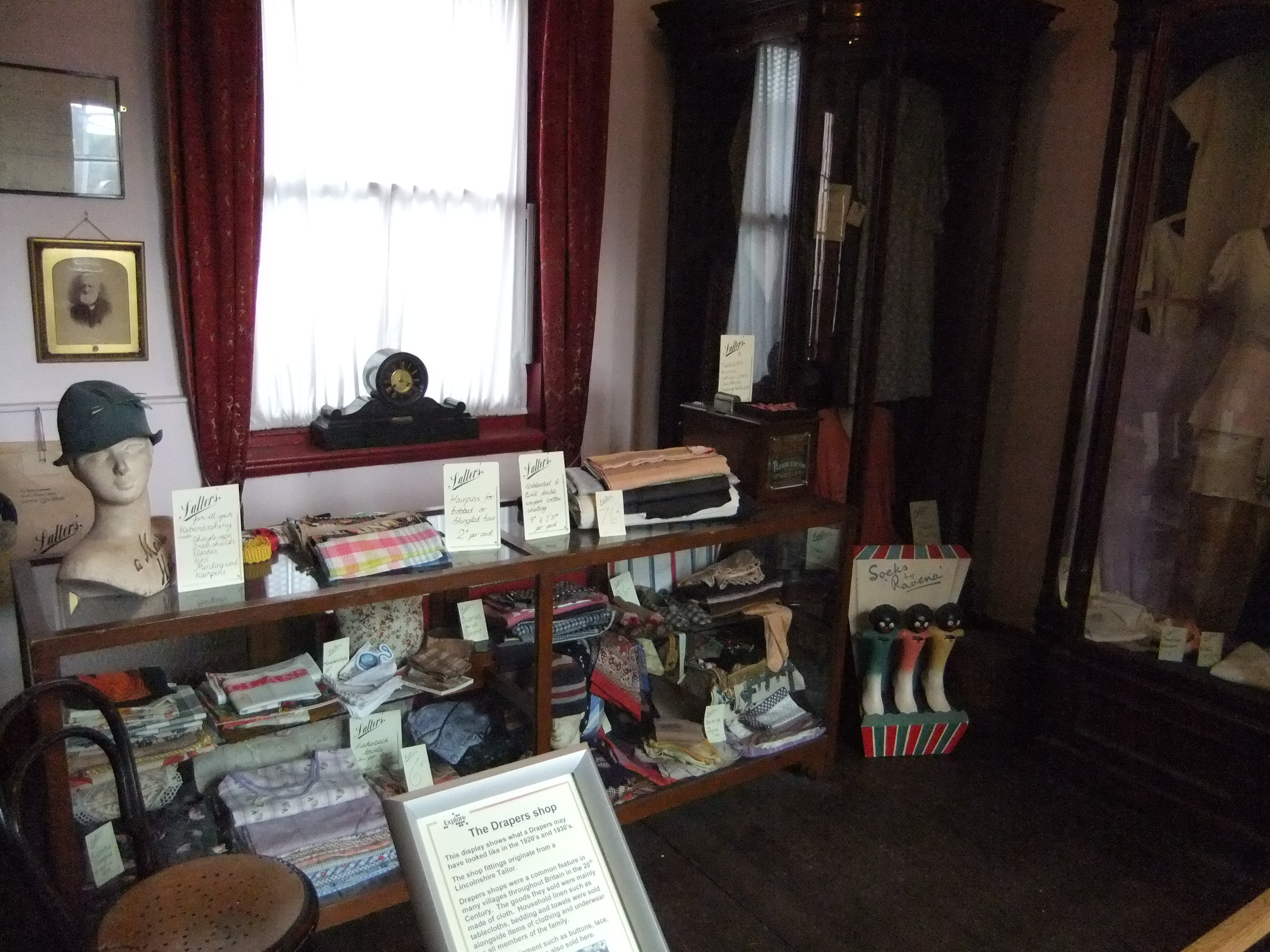
A replica draper's shop at the Museum of Lincolnshire Life, Lincoln, England

A number of notable people who have at one time or another worked as drapers include:

- Sir Thomas Adams, 1st Baronet (1586–1667/1668), Lord Mayor of the City of London
- William Barley (1565?–1614), bookseller and publisher
- Norman Birkett
- Margaret Bondfield (1873–1953), Britain's first female cabinet minister who, at the age of 14, began an apprenticeship at a draper's shop in Hove, near Brighton
- Thomas Burberry, founder of fashion brand "Burberry"
- Eleanor Coade (1733–1821), successful businesswoman with Coade stone, who ran her own business as a linen draper in the City of London
- John Graunt (1620–1674), founder of the science of demography, became a freeman of the Drapers' Company at the age of 21 and worked in his father's drapery shop until his father died in 1662
- Antonie van Leeuwenhoek
- John Spedan Lewis (1885–1963), founder of the John Lewis Partnership
- William McGregor (1846–1911), chairman of Aston Villa Football Club and founder of the Football League
- Anthony Munday (1560?–1633), playwright
- Hector MacDonald, was a draper's apprentice until at 18 he joined the army.
- Harry S. Truman, haberdasher before he became a Senator, Vice President and President of the United States
- H. G. Wells and his fictional characters Kipps and Mr Polly were draper's assistants
- Edward Whalley, regicide, cousin of Oliver Cromwell
- George Williams, founder of the YMCA
- John Woodward (1665–1728), geologist and physician to King Charles II. At the age of 16 he went to London to be apprenticed to a linen draper.

== Current usage ==
A draper is now defined as a highly skilled role within the fashion industry. The term is used within a fashion design or costume design studio for people tasked with creating garments or patterns by draping fabric over a dress form; draping uses a human form to physically position the cloth into a desired pattern. This is an alternative method to drafting, when the garment is initially worked out from measurements on paper.

A fashion draper may also be known as a "first hand" because they are often the most skilled creator in the workshop and the "first" to work with the cloth for a garment. However a first hand in a costume studio is often an assistant to the draper. They are responsible for cutting the fabric with the patterns and assisting in costume fittings.

== See also ==
- Draper – a surname taken from the occupation
- Don Draper, fictional star of the series Mad Men
- Drapery
- Kraków Cloth Hall – Renaissance landmark of Kraków, Poland
- Millinery
- Worshipful Company of Drapers, the London guild
