= John William Draper =

British-academic (1811–1882)

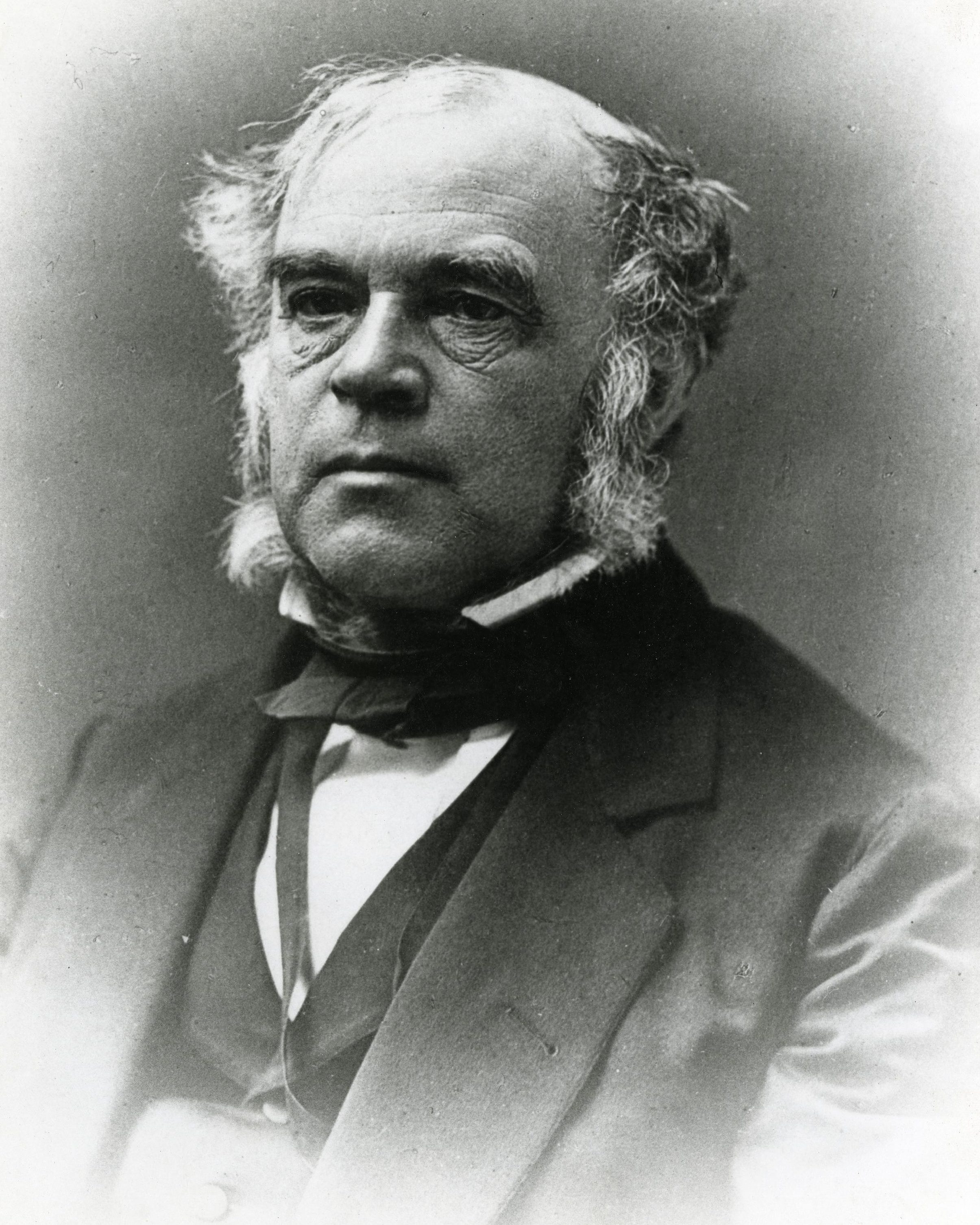
- John William Draper, c. 1879
- Born: May 5, 1811; St. Helens, Lancashire, England, United Kingdom
- Died: January 4, 1882 (aged 70); Hastings-on-Hudson, New York, United States
- Education: University College London; University of Pennsylvania
- Known for: Photochemistry; Draper point Grotthuss–Draper law
- Awards: Rumford Medal (1875)

John William Draper (May 5, 1811 – January 4, 1882) was an English polymath: a scientist, philosopher, physician, chemist, historian and photographer. He is credited with pioneering portrait photography (1839–40) and producing one of the first detailed photographs of the moon in 1840. He was also the first president of the American Chemical Society (1876–77) and a founder of the New York University School of Medicine.

One of Draper's books, the History of the Conflict between Religion and Science, popularised the conflict thesis proposing intrinsic hostility in the relationship between religion and science. It was widely read and was translated into several languages. It makes minimal use of primary sources and is now recognized as thoroughly inaccurate .

His son, Henry Draper, and his granddaughter, Antonia Maury, were astronomers. His granddaughter, Carlotta Maury (Antonia's younger sister), was a paleontologist. His eldest son, John Christopher Draper, was a chemist; and son Daniel Draper, a meteorologist.

== Early life ==
John William Draper was born May 5, 1811, in St. Helens, Lancashire, England, to John Christopher Draper, a Wesleyan clergyman, and Sarah (Ripley) Draper. He also had three sisters, Dorothy Catherine Draper (August 6, 1807 – December 10, 1901), Elizabeth Johnson, and Sarah Ripley. On June 23, he was baptized by the Wesleyan Methodist minister Jabez Bunting. His father often needed to move the family due to serving various congregations throughout England. John Wm. Draper was home tutored until 1822, when he entered Woodhouse Grove School. He returned to home instruction (1826) prior to entering University College London in 1829. While at University College London, Draper studied chemistry under the direction of Edward Turner (chemist).

On September 13, 1831, John William Draper married Antonia Caetana de Paiva Pereira Gardner (c. 1814–1870), the daughter of Daniel Gardner, a court physician to John VI of Portugal and Carlota Joaquina of Spain. Antonia was born in Brazil after the royal family fled Portugal with Napoleon's invasion. There is dispute as to the identity of Antonia's mother. Around 1830, Antonia was sent with her brother Daniel to live with their aunt in London.

Following his father's death in July 1831, John William's mother was urged to move with her children to the US state of Virginia. John William hoped to acquire a teaching position at a local Methodist college.

== Virginia ==
In 1832, the family settled in Mecklenburg County, Virginia, 7 miles (11 km) east of Christiansville (now Chase City). Although he arrived too late to obtain the prospective teaching position, John William established a laboratory in Christiansville. Here he conducted experiments and published eight papers before entering medical school. His sister Dorothy Catherine Draper provided finances through teaching drawing and painting for his medical education. In March 1836, he graduated from the University of Pennsylvania School of Medicine. That same year, he began teaching at Hampden–Sydney College in Virginia.

== New York ==
In 1837, Draper accepted an appointment to be head of chemistry in a proposed medical school at New York University, but sufficient funds were not available to go ahead with the project. In 1839, Draper was elected undergraduate professor of chemistry and botany at the university, and moved with his family to New York City . Once there he helped to found the New York University Medical School, acting as a professor there from 1840 to 1850, president of the school from 1850 to 1873, and as a professor of chemistry until 1881.

== Work ==
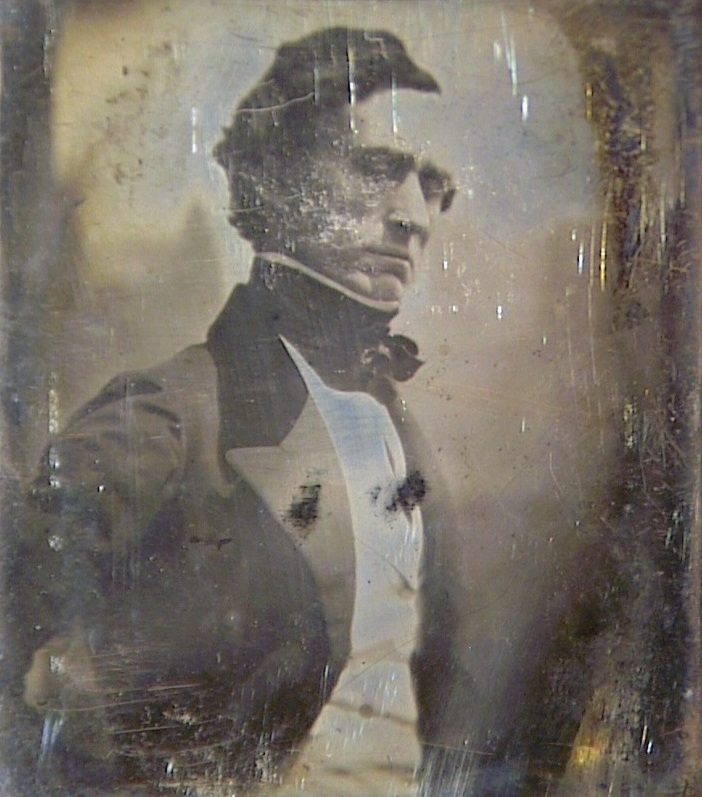
Daguerreotype from a group of portraits believed to have been made by Draper in 1839. It is one of the few early portraits which required the subject to keep his eyes closed due to the bright light.

Draper did important research in photochemistry, made portrait photography possible by his improvements (1839) on Louis Daguerre's process, and published Organization of Plants (1844), a textbook on Chemistry (1846), textbook on Natural Philosophy (1847), textbook on Physiology (1866), and Scientific Memoirs (1878) on radiant energy.

In the spring of 1839, Draper, with years of experience in photochemistry, took talbotype photographs at Hampden Sydney College in Virginia. However, he was dissatisfied with the results and decided to wait for the publication of the daguerreotype process. Once the details of the process arrived in America in late September 1839, Draper, now a professor at New York University, captured landscape photographs. On or around September 23, he took one of the earliest daguerreotype portraits, which depicted his assistant, William Henry Goode.

Throughout 1839 and 1840, Draper focused on solving the challenge of creating daguerreotype portraits. He collaborated with Samuel Morse and in spring 1840 operated a daguerreotype studio, one of the earliest of its kind, in a building on the roof of the New York University. Draper also photographed his sister, Dorothy Catherine Draper, and one of those pictures (see image) became known to the public via the letter which Draper sent to John Herschel in 1840. Several copies were made of this picture in the 19th century, and the photograph attached with Draper's letter was also likely a copy made by Draper himself.

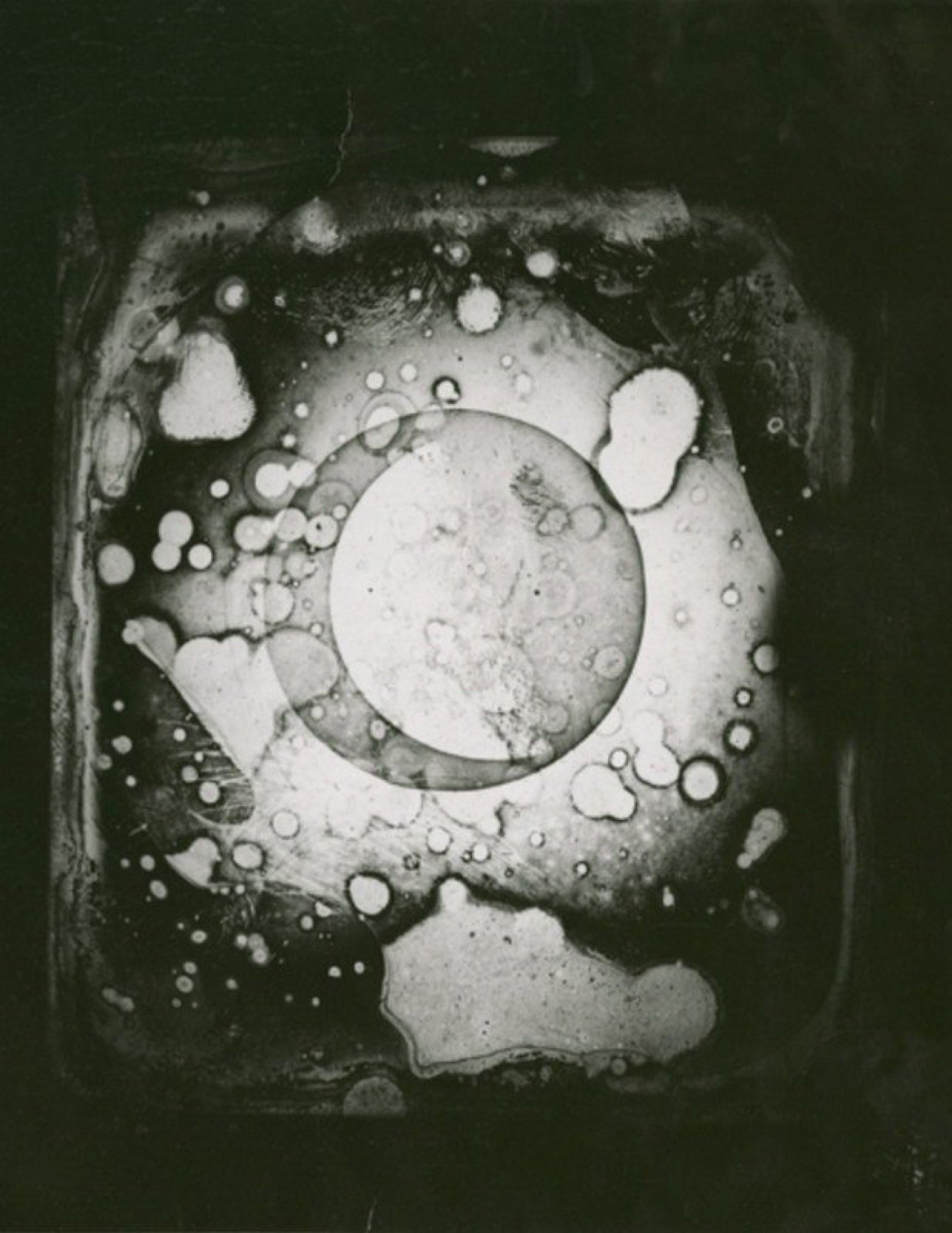
The earliest surviving daguerreotype of the Moon by Draper (1840)

In March 1840 Draper became the second person to produce photographs of an astronomical object, the Moon, considered the first astrophotographs. In 1843 he made daguerreotypes of the solar spectrum that revealed new infra-red and ultra violet lines. In 1850 he was making photomicrographs and engaged his son, Henry (then 13 years old), into their production.

Draper developed the proposition in 1842 that only light rays that are absorbed can produce chemical change. It came to be known as the Grotthuss–Draper law when his name was teamed with a prior but apparently unknown promulgator Theodor Grotthuss of the same idea in 1817.

In 1847 he published the observation that all solids glow red at about the same temperature, about 977 °F (798 K), which has come to be known as the Draper point.

On Saturday 30 May the 1860 Oxford evolution debate featured Draper's lecture on his paper "On the Intellectual Development of Europe, considered with reference to the views of Mr. Darwin and others, that the progression of organisms is determined by law." Draper's presentation was an early example of applying a Darwinian metaphor of adaptation and environment to social and political studies, but was thought to be long and boring. The hall was crowded to hear Bishop Samuel Wilberforce's views on Charles Darwin's recent publication of On the Origin of Species, and the occasion was a historically significant part of the reaction to Darwin's theory due to reports of Thomas Henry Huxley's response to Wilberforce.

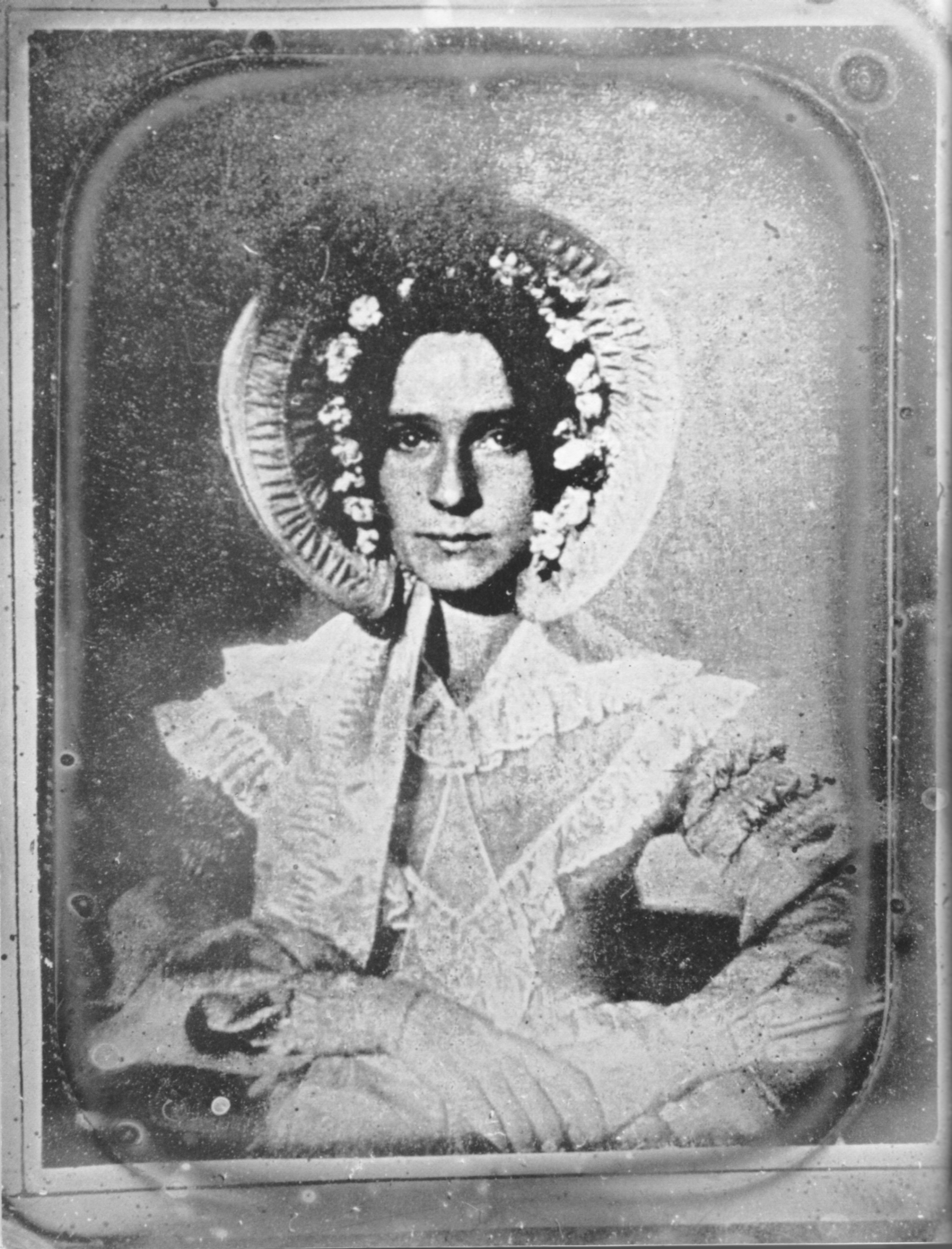
Copy of a photograph of Dorothy Catherine Draper (1807-1901) taken by John Draper c. 1840. Plate size: 8.3×10.2 cm (3 1/4×4 in). See also another copy.

Contributions to the discipline of history: Draper is well known also as the author of The History of the Intellectual Development of Europe (1862), applying the methods of physical science to history, a History of the American Civil War (3 vols., 1867–1870), and a History of the Conflict between Religion and Science (1874). The last book listed is among the most influential works on the conflict thesis, which takes its name from Draper's title. His book examined the relationship between religion and science, dismissing ideas of harmony and presenting the history of science as "not a mere record of isolated discoveries; it is a narrative of the conflict of two contending powers, the expansive force of the human intellect on the one side, and the compression arising from traditional faith and human interests on the other." After outlining the origins of science in ancient Greek philosophy, Draper presented the development of Christianity as leading to repression of science. His argument, aimed at his fellow Protestants, employed anti-Catholic rhetoric, but also said that these "two rival divisions of the Christian church" were "in accord on one point: to tolerate no science except such as they considered agreeable to the Scriptures", and both were liable to "theological odium". The book went through fifty printings in the United States alone, and was translated into ten languages. Professor Ronald Numbers has pointed to Draper's book as a source of popular misconceptions about historical conflict between science and religion, saying that it was "less of a dispassionate history, which it wasn't, than a screed against Roman Catholics" motivated by personal animus at the behavior of his sister, a Catholic nun, regarding the death of his son.

Draper was elected a member of the American Philosophical Society in 1844. He served as the first president of the American Chemical Society in 1876. He was elected to the National Academy of Sciences in 1877.

== Children ==
- John Christopher Draper (1835–1885)
- Henry Draper (1837–1882)
- Virginia Draper Maury (1839–1885)
- Daniel Draper (1841–1931)
- William Draper (1845–1853)
- Antonia Draper Dixon (1849–1923)

== Death ==
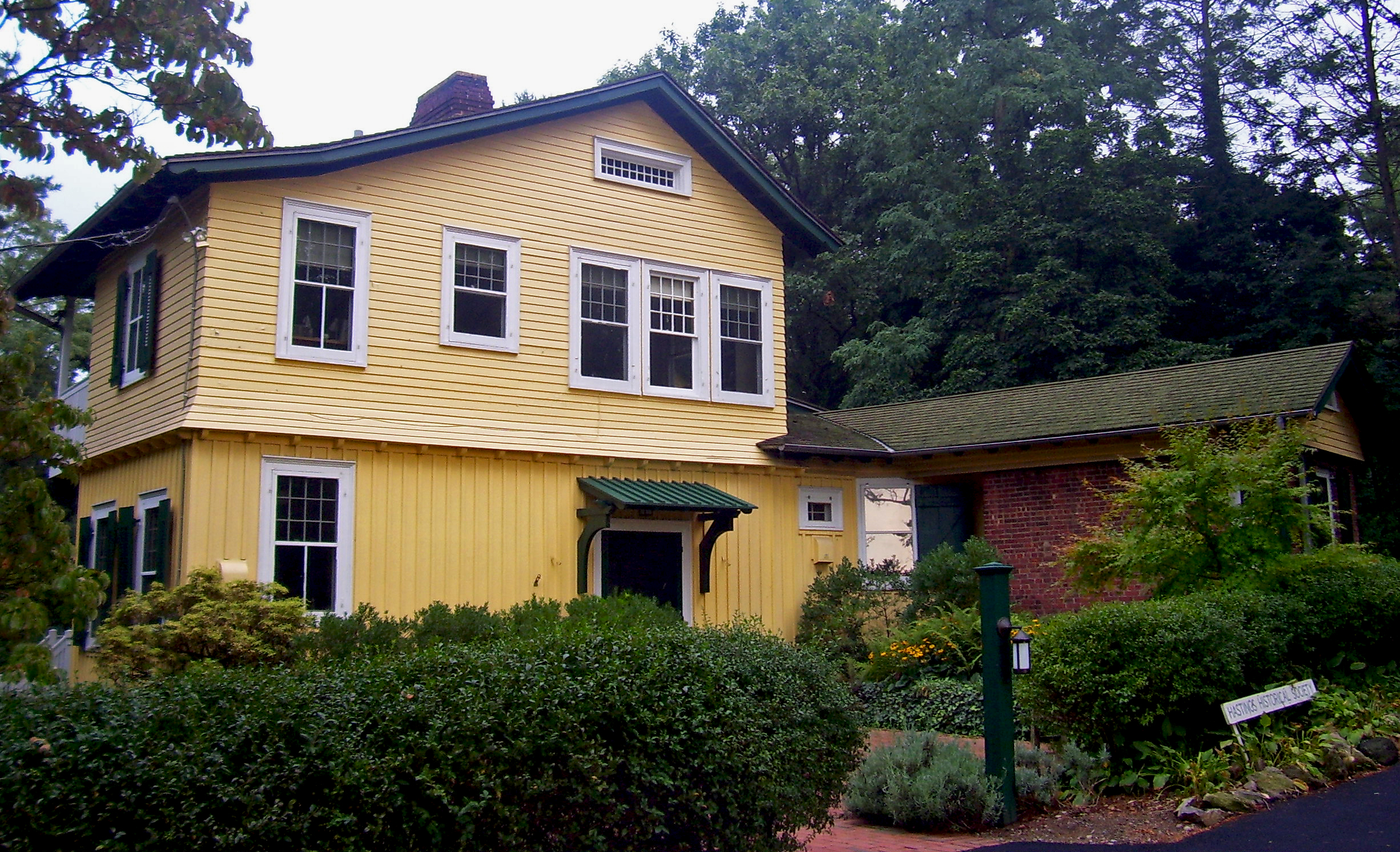
The Draper House (Henry Draper Observatory).

He died on January 4, 1882, at his home in Hastings-on-Hudson, New York, at the age of 70. The funeral was held at St Mark's Church in-the-Bowery in New York City. He was buried in Green-Wood Cemetery, Brooklyn, New York.

== Legacy ==
In 1975, Draper's house, known as the Henry Draper Observatory, in Hastings was designated a National Historic Landmark.

In 1976, New York University founded the John W. Draper Interdisciplinary Master's Program in Humanities and Social Thought (Draper Program) in honor of his lifelong commitment to interdisciplinary study.

In 2001, Draper and the founding of the American Chemical Society were designated a National Historic Chemical Landmark at New York University.

== Publications ==
Draper wrote a number of books and articles for magazines and journals (Google Scholar). His books include:

- Elements of Chemistry, Including the Most Recent Discoveries and Applications of the Science to Medicine and Pharmacy, and to the Arts. by Robert Kane and John William Draper. New York: Harper and Brothers, 1842.
- History of the American Civil War. New York: Harper & Brothers, 1867–70.
- History of the Conflict Between Religion and Science. New York: D. Appleton, 1874.
- History of the Intellectual Development of Europe. New York: Harper & Brothers, 1863, 1900 edition, v. 1, v. 2
- Human Physiology, Statistical and Dynamical; or, the Conditions and Course of the Life of Man. New York: Harper & Brothers, 1856.
- Life of Franklin, Edited by Ronald S. Wilkinson. Washington, D.C.: Library of Congress: U.S. Government Printing Office, 1977.
- Draper, John William. (1875). History of the Conflict between Religion and Science. Henry S. King & Co (reissued by Cambridge University Press, 2009; ISBN 978-1-108-00069-7)
- Science in America: Inaugural address of Dr. John W. Draper, as president of the American Chemical Society New York: J.F. Trow & Son, Printers, 1876.
- Scientific Memoirs; Being Experimental Contributions to a Knowledge of Radiant Energy. New York: Harper & Brothers, 1878.
- Text-Book on Chemistry. For the Use of Schools and Colleges. New York: Harper & Brothers, 1851, 1861 edition
- Text-Book on Natural Philosophy. New York: Harper & Brothers, 1847.
- Thoughts on the Future Civil Policy of America. 3rd ed. New York: Harper & Brothers, 1867.
- Treatise on the Forces Which Produce the Organization of Plants. With an Appendix Containing Several Memoirs on Capillary Attraction, Electricity, and the Chemical Action of Light. New York: Harper & Brothers, 1844.

== Sources ==
- Barker, George Frederick. Memoir of John William Draper: 1811–1882. Washington, D.C., 1886.
- Fleming, Donald Harnish (1950). John William Draper and the Religion of Science. Philadelphia: University of Pennsylvania Press. doi:10.9783/9781512801705. ISBN 978-1-5128-0169-9. JSTOR j.ctv5134fn.
- Hentschel, Klaus (2002). "Why not one more Imponderable?: John William Draper and his 'Tithonic rays'". Foundations of Chemistry. 4 (1): 5–59. doi:10.1023/A:1014443008465.
- Miller, Lillian B., Frederick Voss, and Jeannette M. Hussey. The Lazzaroni: Science and Scientists in Mid-Nineteenth-Century America. Washington, D.C.: Smithsonian Institution Press, 1972.
- Ungureanu, James C. Science, Religion, and the Protestant Tradition: Retracing the Origins of Conflict. Pittsburgh: University of Pittsburgh Press, 2019.
