= John Christopher Draper =

American chemist & surgeon (1835–1885)

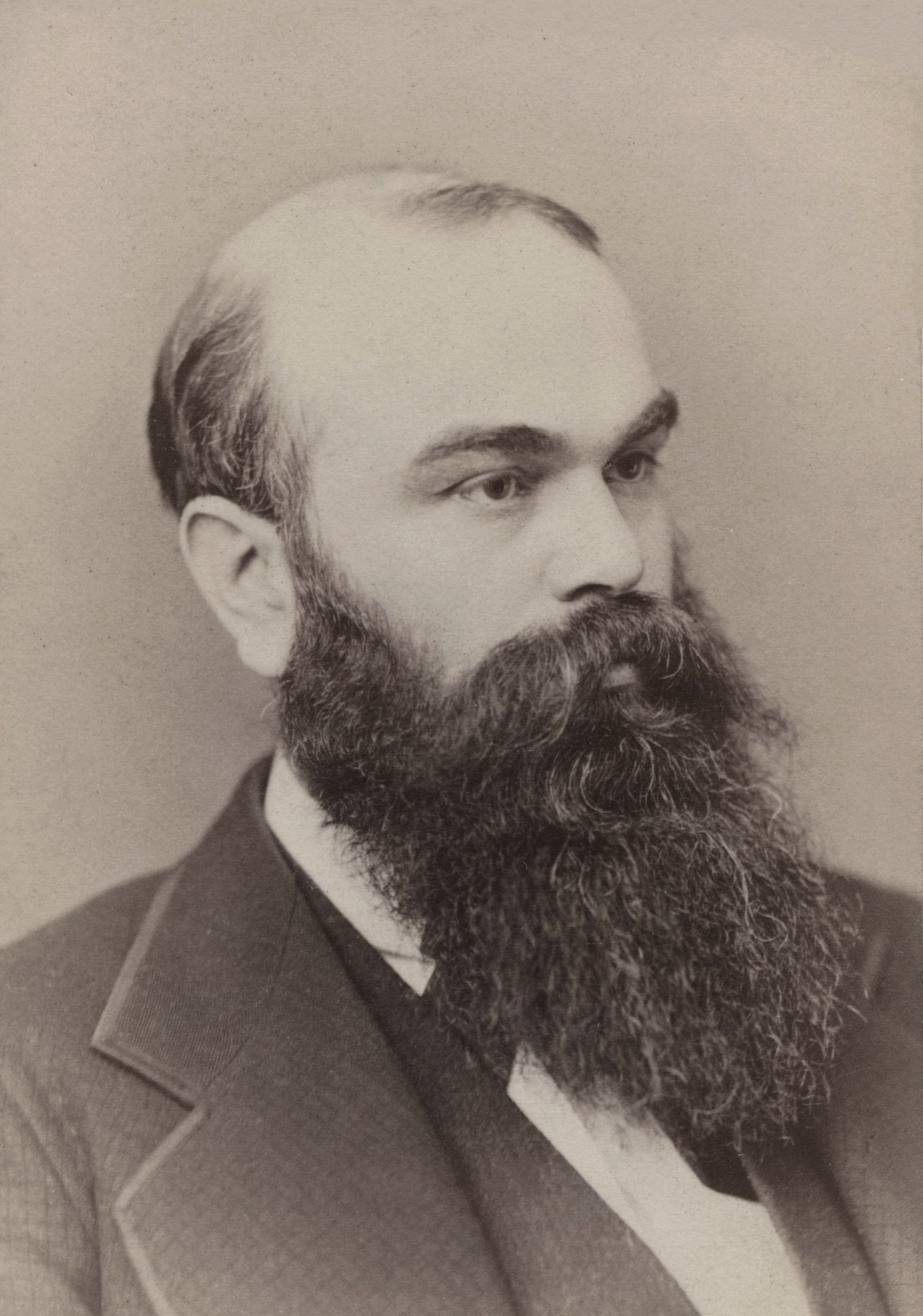
- Born: March 31, 1835; Chase City, Virginia, US
- Died: December 20, 1885 (aged 50); New York City, US
- Scientific career
- Fields: Chemistry

John Christopher Draper (March 31, 1835 – December 20, 1885) was an American chemist and surgeon. He was a son of multidisciplinary scientist John William Draper and a brother of astronomer Henry Draper.

== Life and work ==
Draper was born at Christiansville (now Chase City, Virginia). His father, John William Draper, was an accomplished doctor, chemist, astronomer, botanist, and professor at New York University. Draper's mother, Antonia Coetana de Paiva Pereira Gardner, was a daughter of the personal physician to the John VI of Portugal and Carlota Joaquina of Spain.

In 1850–52 Draper took the arts course, and in 1855–57 the medical course, in New York University, and then studied in Europe. He was professor of natural sciences (1858–60) and of analytical and practical chemistry (1858–71) in New York University, and in 1859 was one of the first instructors of chemistry at the Cooper Union.

On May 31, 1862, he joined S Company, 12th New York Infantry Regiment as an assistant surgeon along with his brother Henry, who joined as a surgeon. They served until October 8, 1862.

From 1863 to 1885 he was professor of physiology and natural history in the College of the City of New York; in 1865–85, professor of chemistry in the medical department of New York University. In 1873 he received the degree of Doctor of Laws from Trinity College. Draper died suddenly, of pneumonia which he caught during a cold winter. He was serving his duties just a few days before death.

== Publications ==
- Is muscular motion the cause of the production of urea?: being a thesis for the degree of Doctor of Medicine, in the University of New York. Holman & Gray, Printers. 1856.
- A text-book on anatomy, physiology, and hygiene ... Harper & brothers. 1866.
- A text-book on anatomy, physiology, and hygiene for the use of schools and families. Harper and Brothers. 1866.
- Year-Book of Nature and Popular Science For 1872. ISBN 978-1-143-06365-7.
- Coffee and its adulterations. Printed by the New York Printing Co. 1867.
- Draper, John Christopher (1882). A Practical Laboratory Course in Medical Chemistry. ISBN 978-1-144-11323-8.
- A text-book of medical physics: for the use of students and practitioners of medicine. Lea Brothers. 1885.
- A Textbook on anatomy, physiology, and hygiene for the use of schools and colleges. Harper. 1891.
