= Charles Draper (musician) =

British clarinettist (1869–1952)

- Born: 23 October 1869; Odcombe, Somerset, England
- Died: 21 October 1952 (aged 82) Surbiton, London, England
- Genres: Classical
- Instrument: Clarinet

Charles Draper (23 October 1869 – 21 October 1952) was an English classical clarinettist, sometimes described as the "grandfather of English clarinettists". Born into a musical family, he studied at the Royal College of Music (RCM) in London under Henry Lazarus and Julian Egerton. He co-founded the New Symphony Orchestra in 1905, and had long associations with the orchestras of the Royal Philharmonic Society, and the Leeds and Three Choirs festivals.

Draper was a well-known teacher, a professor at the RCM, Trinity College of Music, Kneller Hall and the Guildhall School of Music and Drama.

== Life and career ==
=== Early years ===
Charles Draper was born on 23 October 1869 in Odcombe, Somerset. His father Samuel – the village carpenter and an amateur cellist – and his wife Hannah (née Rodber) had a large family. Charles was the eighth and youngest son. Samuel died in 1888 and the family came under the guardianship of the second-oldest son, Paul. They moved to Penarth in South Wales, where Paul was conductor of the town band. He played several instruments and was able to give all his brothers lessons on various instruments, and eventually they all played in the band under his direction. Charles showed such aptitude for the clarinet that Paul sent him to London in 1888 to have private lessons from a leading player, Henry Lazarus.

Impressed by what he described as Draper's "fine tone and very great facility", Lazarus recommended him to Sir George Grove, director of the Royal College of Music (RCM). Draper won an open scholarship to the college in March 1889; he continued studying with Lazarus, who was the college's clarinet professor. The usual three-year scholarship was extended to five because of Draper's outstanding progress. Lazarus retired from the professorship in 1894 and Draper was then taught by the RCM's new clarinet professor, Julian Egerton.

== Professional career ==
Grove was succeeded as director of the RCM in January 1895 by Hubert Parry, who in July that year helped Draper to gain his first professional appointment, with the Crystal Palace orchestra under August Manns. In the same year, Draper married Elizabeth Carrington, who had been a fellow student at the RCM. They had one daughter and four sons, who included the bassoonist Paul Beaumont Draper and the violinist Charles Carrington Draper.

Draper was a member of Queen Victoria's private band during the last years of her reign (1899–1901), and was later Musician in Ordinary to Edward VII. In 1903, he was the soloist in the first performance of Charles Villiers Stanford's Clarinet Concerto. Stanford's later Clarinet Sonata was dedicated to Draper. In 1905, together with the flautist Eli Hudson, Draper founded the New Symphony Orchestra, a cooperative, self-governing ensemble of 46 players. Within a year the orchestra had recruited Thomas Beecham as principal conductor; it flourished, eventually transforming itself into the Royal Albert Hall Orchestra.

Draper had a long association with the orchestras of the Royal Philharmonic Society, and the Leeds and Three Choirs festivals. He played first clarinet in the London Symphony Orchestra from time to time.

In 1923, Draper started his own firm, The Louis Musical Instrument Company, with premises in Chelsea. It made clarinets and other wind instruments, including three-hole pipes for the nascent folk-song movement. The company was later absorbed by Rudall Carte & Company. He was also a professor at the RCM, Trinity College of Music, Kneller Hall and the Guildhall School of Music and Drama, counting Frederick Thurston among his students.

Draper died in Surbiton on 21 October 1952, aged 82. He was buried in Putney Vale Cemetery.

== Musical family ==
His nephew was the clarinettist Haydn Draper (1889–1934) who studied with Julian Egerton and with his uncle at the Royal College of Music. On graduating he replaced Charlesworth Fawcett as principal clarinet in the Queens Hall Orchestra under Henry Wood - who composed the exacting clarinet cadenza in his 1905 Fantasia on British Sea Songs specifically for Haydn. In 1920 he was appointed principal clarinet in the City of Birmingham Symphony Orchestra. He also performed with the London Wind Quintette alongside Robert Murchie (flute), Leon Goossens (oboe), Frederick Wood (bassoon) and Aubrey Brain (horn) and led the clarinet section of the BBC Wireless Military Band from its inception in 1927. Haydn also toured with the Lener String Quartet, He gave the first performance of Busoni's Concertino at the Aeolian Hall in May 1921.

- Samuel Draper (1824–1888), amateur cellist and flautist
  - Paul Draper (1854–1922), bassoonist, teacher, military musician
    - Marion Draper (1887–1964), violinist and pianist
    - Haydn Draper (1889–1934), clarinettist, military and orchestral player
    - Mendelssohn Draper (1891–1970), bass clarinet specialist, orchestral player
  - Richard Draper (1857–1938), bassoonist, Queen's Hall Orchestra, D'Oyly Carte and Carl Rosa Opera companies
  - Charles Draper (1869–1952), clarinettist
    - Charles Carrington Draper (1897–1930), violinist
    - Paul Beaumont Draper (1899–1971), bassoonist, founder member of the Melos Ensemble (1952)

== Sources ==
- Langley, Leanne (2012). "Joining up the Dots". In Bennett Zon (ed.). Music and Performance Culture in Nineteenth-Century Britain. Abingdon and New York: Routledge. ISBN 978-1-4094-3979-0.
- Lucas, John (2008). Thomas Beecham: An Obsession with Music. Woodbridge: Boydell Press. ISBN 978-1-84383-402-1.
- Weston, Pamela (1971). Clarinet Virtuosi of the Past. Hale. ISBN 978-0-7091-2442-9.
- Weston, Pamela (1977). More Clarinet Virtuosi of the Past. Fentone Music. ISBN 978-0-7091-2442-9.
- Weston, Pamela (2011). "Players and composers". In Colin Lawson (ed.). The Cambridge Companion to the Clarinet. Cambridge: Cambridge University Press. ISBN 978-1-13-900205-9.
