= Henry Draper =

American doctor and amateur astronomer (1837–1882)

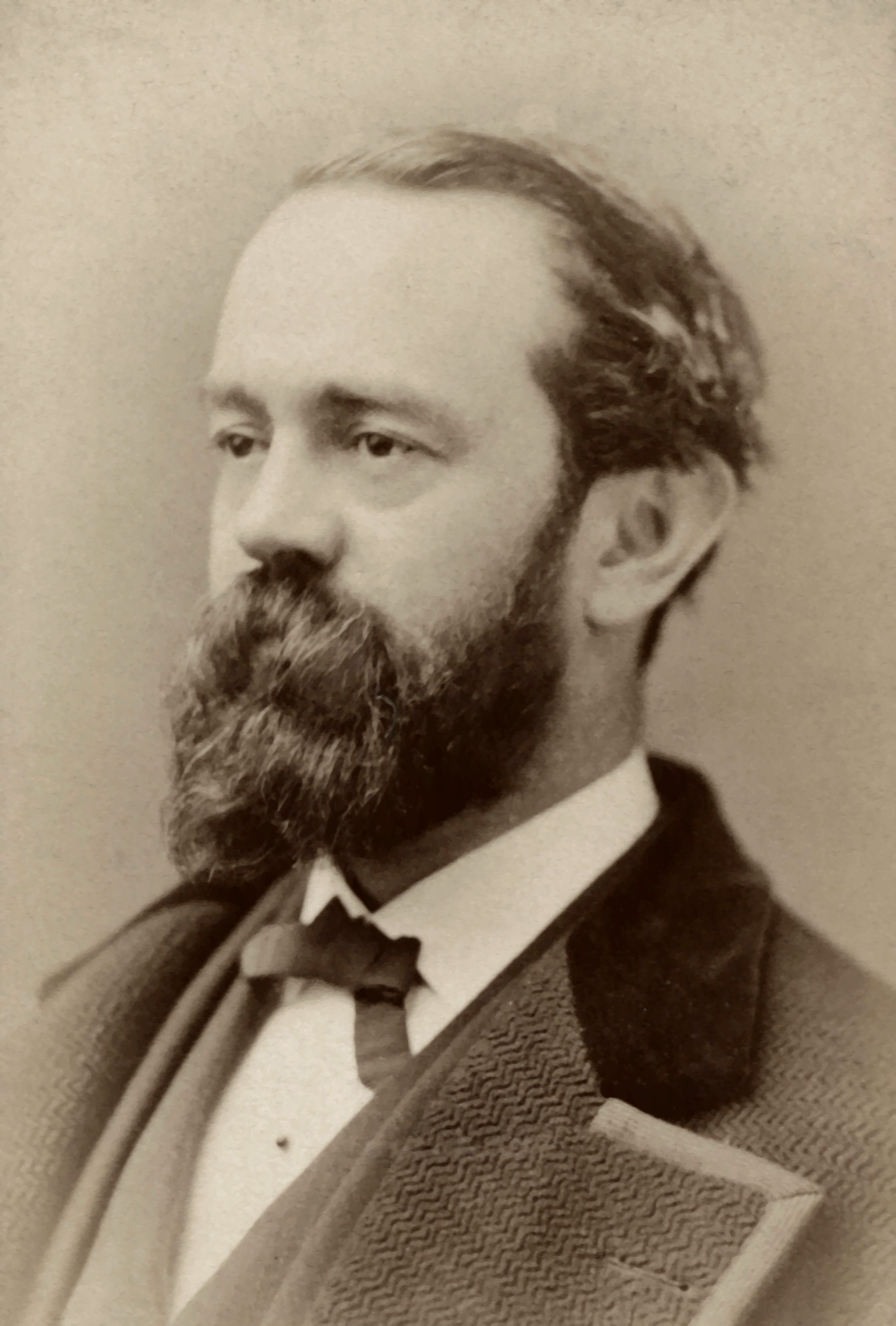
- Born: March 7, 1837; Prince Edward County, Virginia, US
- Died: November 20, 1882 (aged 45); New York City, US
- Education: New York University School of Medicine
- Scientific career
- Fields: Astronomy

Signature
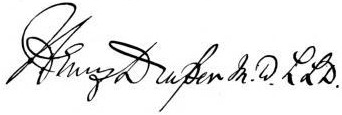

Henry Draper (March 7, 1837 – November 20, 1882) was an American medical doctor and amateur astronomer. He is best known today as a pioneer of astrophotography.

== Life and work ==
Henry Draper's father, John William Draper, was an accomplished doctor, chemist, botanist, and professor at New York University; he was also the first to photograph the moon through a telescope (1840). Draper's mother was Antonia Caetana de Paiva Pereira Gardner, daughter of the personal physician to the Emperor of Brazil. His niece, Antonia Maury was also an astronomer.

He graduated from New York University School of Medicine, at the age of 20, in 1857. He worked first as a physician at Bellevue Hospital, and later as both a professor and dean of medicine at New York University (NYU). On May 31, 1862, he joined S Company, 12th New York Infantry Regiment as a surgeon along with his brother John Christopher, who joined as an assistant surgeon. They served until October 8, 1862. In 1867 he married Mary Anna Palmer, a wealthy socialite who collaborated with him in his astronomy work.

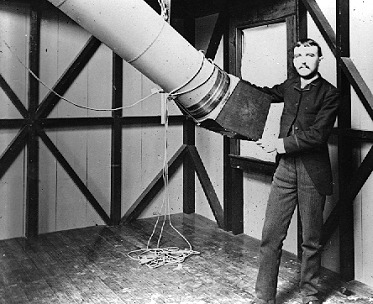
Henry Draper.

Draper was one of the pioneers of the use of astrophotography. In 1872, he took a stellar spectrum that showed absorption lines. Others, such as Joseph Fraunhofer, Lewis Morris Rutherfurd and Angelo Secchi, preceded him in that ambition.

He resigned his chair in the medical department in 1873, to allow for more time for original research.

He directed an expedition to photograph the 1874 transit of Venus, and was the first to photograph the Orion Nebula, on September 30, 1880. Using his 11-inch Clark Brothers photographic refractor he took a 50-minute exposure. He photographed the spectrum of Jupiter in 1880.

The Henry Draper Observatory where he took his much-admired photographs of the moon, was in Hastings-on-Hudson, New York. Today the building functions as the Hastings-on-Hudson Historical Society.

Draper received numerous awards, including honorary LL.D. law degrees from NYU and the University of Wisconsin–Madison in 1882, a Congressional medal for directing the U.S. expedition to photograph the 1874 transit of Venus, and election to both the National Academy of Sciences and the Astronomische Gesellschaft. In addition, he held memberships in the American Photographic Society, the American Philosophical Society, the American Academy of Arts and Sciences, and the American Association for the Advancement of Science.

After his untimely early death from double pleurisy, his widow Mary Anna Draper funded the Henry Draper Medal for outstanding contributions to astrophysics and a telescope, which was used to prepare the Henry Draper Catalog of stellar spectra. This historical Henry Draper telescope is now at the Toruń Centre for Astronomy (Nicolaus Copernicus University) at Piwnice, Poland. The small crater Draper on the Moon is named in his honor.

== Selected works ==
- The Changes of Blood-Cells in the Spleen, thesis, 1858.
- A Text-Book on Chemistry, 1866 revision of his father's 1846 text. Pages 1–10 of the revision give an overview of the history of chemistry.
- Are there other inhabited worlds?, 1866.
- "The spectroscope and its revelations" (PDF). Scientific American. 15 (2): 17–18. 1866.
- Delusions of Medicine, Charms, talismans, amulets, astrology, and mesmerism, 1873.
- The Discovery of Oxygen in the Sun by Photography, 1877, American Journal of Science and Arts.

== See also ==
- Andrew Ainslie Common
- Henry Draper Medal
- Henry Draper Catalogue
