= Diadegma chrysostictos =

Scientific classification
- Domain: Eukaryota
- Kingdom: Animalia
- Phylum: Arthropoda
- Class: Insecta
- Order: Hymenoptera
- Family: Ichneumonidae
- Genus: Diadegma
- Species: D. chrysostictos

Binomial name
- Diadegma chrysostictos (Gmelin, 1790)

Synonyms
- Diadegma orientator Aubert, 1965; Diadegma corsicator (Aubert, 1961); Diadegma quinquerufum (Constantineanu, 1950); Diadegma incipiens (Walley, 1929); Diadegma curtum (Viereck, 1925); Diadegma triangulare (Viereck, 1925); Diadegma petiolatum (Viereck, 1925); Diadegma bakeri (Viereck, 1925); Diadegma costatum (Viereck, 1925); Diadegma galleriae (Cushman, 1920); Diadegma woonandi (Viereck, 1917); Diadegma kiehtani (Viereck, 1917)

Species of wasp

Diadegma chrysostictos is a wasp first described by J.F. Gmelin in 1790. No subspecies are listed.
