= Diadegma acutum =

Scientific classification
- Domain: Eukaryota
- Kingdom: Animalia
- Phylum: Arthropoda
- Class: Insecta
- Order: Hymenoptera
- Family: Ichneumonidae
- Genus: Diadegma
- Species: D. acutum

Binomial name
- Diadegma acutum (Viereck, 1925)

Synonyms
- Diadegma platyptiliae (Cushman, 1939); Diadegma vancouverense (Viereck, 1925)

Species of wasp

Diadegma acutum is a wasp first described by Henry Lorenz Viereck in 1925. No subspecies are listed.

== See also ==
- Platyptilia carduidactyla
