= List of Polycyrtus species =

These 169 species belong to Polycyrtus, a genus of ichneumon wasps in the family Ichneumonidae.

== Polycyrtus species ==
- Polycyrtus accuratus (Cresson, 1874)^{c g}
- Polycyrtus acerbus (Cresson, 1874)^{c g}
- Polycyrtus albiniclavus Cushman, 1931^{c g}
- Polycyrtus albispina Szepligeti, 1916^{c g}
- Polycyrtus alboannulatus Szepligeti, 1916^{c}
- Polycyrtus albocinctus Zuniga, 2004^{c g}
- Polycyrtus albolineatus Cameron, 1911^{c}
- Polycyrtus alei Zuniga, 2004^{c g}
- Polycyrtus alexisi Zuniga, 2004^{c g}
- Polycyrtus alterator (Trentepohl, 1829)^{c g}
- Polycyrtus amoenus (Viereck, 1913)^{c g}
- Polycyrtus areolaris Cushman, 1931^{c g}
- Polycyrtus areolatus Cushman, 1931^{c g}
- Polycyrtus atriceps (Cresson, 1874)^{c}
- Polycyrtus avilae Zuniga, 2004^{c g}
- Polycyrtus barrientosi Zuniga, 2004^{c g}
- Polycyrtus bicarinatus Cushman, 1931^{c g}
- Polycyrtus bicolor Zuniga, 2004^{c g}
- Polycyrtus boliviensis Cushman, 1931^{c g}
- Polycyrtus brevigenalis Cushman, 1931^{c g}
- Polycyrtus brunneator (Fabricius, 1798)^{c g}
- Polycyrtus bulbosus Cushman, 1931^{c g}
- Polycyrtus burgosi Kasparyan & Ruiz-Cancino, 2003^{c g}
- Polycyrtus buscki Cushman, 1931^{c g}
- Polycyrtus calii Zuniga, 2004^{c g}
- Polycyrtus capitator (Fabricius, 1804)^{c g}
- Polycyrtus carinispinis Cushman, 1931^{c g}
- Polycyrtus carmenae Zuniga, 2004^{c g}
- Polycyrtus caudatus Szepligeti, 1916^{c g}
- Polycyrtus cedrella (Kasparyan & Ruiz-Cancino, 2003)^{c g}
- Polycyrtus chalmersi Zuniga, 2004^{c g}
- Polycyrtus chiriquensis Cameron, 1886^{c g}
- Polycyrtus circumfluens Cushman, 1931^{c g}
- Polycyrtus clausus Zuniga, 2004^{c g}
- Polycyrtus clavator Kasparyan & Ruiz-Cancino, 2003^{c g}
- Polycyrtus cockerellae Viereck, 1912^{c g}
- Polycyrtus comma Kasparyan & Ruiz-Cancino, 2003^{c g}
- Polycyrtus condylobus Zuniga, 2004^{c g}
- Polycyrtus confusus Cushman, 1931^{c g}
- Polycyrtus constricticlavus Cushman, 1931^{c g}
- Polycyrtus convergens Cushman, 1931^{c g}
- Polycyrtus copiosus (Cresson, 1874)^{c g}
- Polycyrtus copularis Zuniga, 2004^{c g}
- Polycyrtus crespoi Kasparyan & Ruiz-Cancino, 2003^{c g}
- Polycyrtus curtispina Kasparyan & Ruiz-Cancino, 2003^{c g}
- Polycyrtus curvispina Cameron, 1886^{c g}
- Polycyrtus curviventris Cameron, 1886^{c g}
- Polycyrtus dahianae Zuniga, 2004^{c g}
- Polycyrtus delphini (Kasparyan & Ruiz-Cancino, 2003)^{c g}
- Polycyrtus dentatorius (Fabricius, 1804)^{c g}
- Polycyrtus donzoi Zuniga, 2004^{c g}
- Polycyrtus duplaris Zuniga, 2004^{c g}
- Polycyrtus duplicatus Cushman, 1931^{c g}
- Polycyrtus elegans (Provancher, 1888)^{c g}
- Polycyrtus eliethae Zuniga, 2004^{c g}
- Polycyrtus elviae Zuniga, 2004^{c g}
- Polycyrtus emaculatus Szepligeti, 1916^{c g}
- Polycyrtus emarginatus (Brulle, 1846)^{c g}
- Polycyrtus eneyae Zuniga, 2004^{c g}
- Polycyrtus enriquei Zuniga, 2004^{c g}
- Polycyrtus epimeron (Kasparyan & Ruiz-Cancino, 2003)^{c g}
- Polycyrtus erythrosternus Cameron, 1886^{c g}
- Polycyrtus femoratus Spinola, 1840^{c g}
- Polycyrtus ferox (Cresson, 1873)^{c g}
- Polycyrtus fonsecai Zuniga, 2004^{c g}
- Polycyrtus furvus (Cresson, 1874)^{c g}
- Polycyrtus gauldi Zuniga, 2004^{c g}
- Polycyrtus giacomellii Schrottky, 1911^{c g}
- Polycyrtus gibbulus Szepligeti, 1916^{c g}
- Polycyrtus gynnae Zuniga, 2004^{c g}
- Polycyrtus hernandezi Zuniga, 2004^{c g}
- Polycyrtus herrerai Zuniga, 2004^{c g}
- Polycyrtus hidalgoi Zuniga, 2004^{c g}
- Polycyrtus hilaris (Kasparyan & Ruiz-Cancino, 2003)^{c g}
- Polycyrtus histrio Spinola, 1840^{c g}
- Polycyrtus humerosus Cushman, 1931^{c g}
- Polycyrtus iconicus Zuniga, 2004^{c g}
- Polycyrtus impressus Cushman, 1931^{c g}
- Polycyrtus inca Cushman, 1931^{c g}
- Polycyrtus inezae Zuniga, 2004^{c g}
- Polycyrtus infractus Cushman, 1931^{c g}
- Polycyrtus inquinatus Cushman, 1931^{c g}
- Polycyrtus isidroi Zuniga, 2004^{c g}
- Polycyrtus isthmus Cushman, 1931^{c g}
- Polycyrtus javieri Zuniga, 2004^{c g}
- Polycyrtus josei Zuniga, 2004^{c g}
- Polycyrtus juani Zuniga, 2004^{c g}
- Polycyrtus juanmii Zuniga, 2004^{c g}
- Polycyrtus junceus (Cresson, 1874)^{c g}
- Polycyrtus kattyae Zuniga, 2004^{c g}
- Polycyrtus latigulus Zuniga, 2004^{c g}
- Polycyrtus leprieurii Spinola, 1840^{c g}
- Polycyrtus leucopus (Brulle, 1846)^{c g}
- Polycyrtus leucostomus (Taschenberg, 1876)^{c g}
- Polycyrtus lidiae Zuniga, 2004^{c g}
- Polycyrtus lindhae Zuniga, 2004^{c g}
- Polycyrtus lituratus (Brulle, 1846)^{c g}
- Polycyrtus lovejoyi Zuniga, 2004^{c g}
- Polycyrtus lucidator Erichson, 1848^{c g}
- Polycyrtus luisi Zuniga, 2004^{c g}
- Polycyrtus macer (Cresson, 1874)^{c}
- Polycyrtus maculatus Zuniga, 2004^{c g}
- Polycyrtus major (Cresson, 1874)^{c g}
- Polycyrtus mancus (Cresson, 1874)^{c g}
- Polycyrtus manni Cushman, 1931^{c g}
- Polycyrtus marcoi Zuniga, 2004^{c g}
- Polycyrtus martini Zuniga, 2004^{c g}
- Polycyrtus medialbus Cushman, 1931^{c g}
- Polycyrtus mediotinctus Cushman, 1931^{c g}
- Polycyrtus melanocephalus Cameron, 1911^{c g}
- Polycyrtus melanoleucus (Brulle, 1846)^{c g}
- Polycyrtus minutus Cushman, 1931^{c g}
- Polycyrtus nanii Zuniga, 2004^{c g}
- Polycyrtus neglectus Cushman, 1926^{c g b}
- Polycyrtus nigriceps (Brulle, 1846)^{c}
- Polycyrtus nigriclypeatus Cushman, 1931^{c g}
- Polycyrtus nigroscutellatus (Brulle, 1846)^{c g}
- Polycyrtus nigrotibialis Szepligeti, 1916^{c g}
- Polycyrtus nudus Szepligeti, 1916^{c g}
- Polycyrtus obtusispina Cameron, 1885^{c g}
- Polycyrtus ornatifrons Cushman, 1931^{c g}
- Polycyrtus pallidibalteatus Cameron, 1885^{c g}
- Polycyrtus pallidus (Cresson, 1874)^{c g}
- Polycyrtus paranensis Cushman, 1931^{c g}
- Polycyrtus parmenioi Zuniga, 2004^{c g}
- Polycyrtus parviclavus Cushman, 1931^{c g}
- Polycyrtus patriciae Zuniga, 2004^{c g}
- Polycyrtus paululus (Cresson, 1874)^{c g}
- Polycyrtus perditor (Fabricius, 1804)^{c g}
- Polycyrtus prominens Cushman, 1931^{c g}
- Polycyrtus proximannulatus Cushman, 1931^{c g}
- Polycyrtus quadrisulcatus Spinola, 1840^{c g}
- Polycyrtus raveni Zuniga, 2004^{c g}
- Polycyrtus rebecae Zuniga, 2004^{c g}
- Polycyrtus retusus Zuniga, 2004^{c g}
- Polycyrtus riojanus Brèthes, 1916^{c g}
- Polycyrtus rufiventris Spinola, 1840^{c g}
- Polycyrtus rugulosus Szepligeti, 1916^{c g}
- Polycyrtus sartor (Fabricius, 1804)^{c g}
- Polycyrtus semialbus (Cresson, 1865)^{c g}
- Polycyrtus semirufus Szepligeti, 1916^{c}
- Polycyrtus sigillatus Zuniga, 2004^{c g}
- Polycyrtus similis Szepligeti, 1916^{c}
- Polycyrtus solisi Zuniga, 2004^{c g}
- Polycyrtus soniae Kasparyan & Ruiz-Cancino, 2003^{c g}
- Polycyrtus spinatorius (Fabricius, 1804)^{c g}
- Polycyrtus subtenuis (Cresson, 1865)^{c}
- Polycyrtus superbus (Provancher, 1888)^{c g}
- Polycyrtus surinamensis Szepligeti, 1916^{c}
- Polycyrtus suturalis (Brulle, 1846)^{c g}
- Polycyrtus testaceus (Taschenberg, 1876)^{c}
- Polycyrtus texanus (Porter, 1977)^{c g}
- Polycyrtus thoracicus Tzankov & Alayo, 1974^{c g}
- Polycyrtus tigrinus Zuniga, 2004^{c g}
- Polycyrtus tinctipennis Cameron, 1886^{c g}
- Polycyrtus triangularis Cushman, 1931^{c g}
- Polycyrtus trichromus (Spinola, 1851)^{c g}
- Polycyrtus tricolor (Brulle, 1846)^{c}
- Polycyrtus trilineatus (Brulle, 1846)^{c}
- Polycyrtus trochanteratus Szepligeti, 1916^{c}
- Polycyrtus tuberculatus (Brulle, 1846)^{c g}
- Polycyrtus tubulifer (Viereck, 1913)^{c g}
- Polycyrtus univittatus (Cresson, 1874)^{c g}
- Polycyrtus vierecki Townes, 1966^{c g}
- Polycyrtus wilsoni Zuniga, 2004^{c g}
- Polycyrtus xanthocarpus Szepligeti, 1916^{c}
- Polycyrtus xanthopus (Brulle, 1846)^{c}
- Polycyrtus xantothorax (Brulle, 1846)^{c g}
- Polycyrtus yucatan Kasparyan & Ruiz-Cancino, 2003^{c g}

Data sources: i = ITIS, c = Catalogue of Life, g = GBIF, b = Bugguide.net
