= Diadegma crassicorne =

Scientific classification
- Domain: Eukaryota
- Kingdom: Animalia
- Phylum: Arthropoda
- Class: Insecta
- Order: Hymenoptera
- Family: Ichneumonidae
- Genus: Diadegma
- Species: D. crassicorne

Binomial name
- Diadegma crassicorne (Gravenhorst, 1829)

Synonyms
- Diadegma normannicum (Rudow, 1883); Diadegma brevicorne (Holmgren, 1860); Diadegma carnifex (Gravenhorst, 1829)

Species of wasp

Diadegma crassicorne is a wasp first described by Johann Ludwig Christian Gravenhorst in 1829. No subspecies are listed.
