= Diadegma argyloplocevora =

Scientific classification
- Domain: Eukaryota
- Kingdom: Animalia
- Phylum: Arthropoda
- Class: Insecta
- Order: Hymenoptera
- Family: Ichneumonidae
- Genus: Diadegma
- Species: D. argyloplocevora

Binomial name
- Diadegma argyloplocevora (Uchida, 1932)

Species of wasp

Diadegma argyloplocevora is a wasp first described by Tohru Uchida in 1932. No subspecies are listed.
