= Diadegma acronyctae =

Scientific classification
- Domain: Eukaryota
- Kingdom: Animalia
- Phylum: Arthropoda
- Class: Insecta
- Order: Hymenoptera
- Family: Ichneumonidae
- Genus: Diadegma
- Species: D. acronyctae

Binomial name
- Diadegma acronyctae (Ashmead, 1896)

Synonyms
- Diadegma alterum (Viereck, 1925); Diadegma rosanae (Viereck, 1924)

Species of wasp

Diadegma acronyctae is a wasp first described by William Harris Ashmead in 1896. No subspecies are listed.
