= Diadegma insulare =

Scientific classification
- Domain: Eukaryota
- Kingdom: Animalia
- Phylum: Arthropoda
- Class: Insecta
- Order: Hymenoptera
- Family: Ichneumonidae
- Genus: Diadegma
- Species: D. insulare

Binomial name
- Diadegma insulare (Cresson, 1865)

Synonyms
- Diadegma congregator (Walley, 1926); Diadegma pygmaeum (Viereck, 1925); Diadegma plutellae (Viereck, 1912); Diadegma hellulae (Viereck, 1912); Diadegma polynesiale (Cameron, 1883)

Species of wasp

Diadegma insulare is a wasp first described by Ezra Townsend Cresson in 1865. No subspecies are listed. It is a parasitoid of the diamondback moth, which is a pest of cruciferous crops.
