= A. helvola =

A. helvola may refer to:

- Agrochola helvola, species of moth
- Andrena helvola, species of mining bee
