= Diadegma aestivale =

Scientific classification
- Domain: Eukaryota
- Kingdom: Animalia
- Phylum: Arthropoda
- Class: Insecta
- Order: Hymenoptera
- Family: Ichneumonidae
- Genus: Diadegma
- Species: D. aestivale

Binomial name
- Diadegma aestivale (Viereck, 1921)

Species of wasp

Diadegma aestivale is a wasp first described by Henry Lorenz Viereck in 1921. No subspecies are listed.
