= Diadegma clavicorne =

Scientific classification
- Domain: Eukaryota
- Kingdom: Animalia
- Phylum: Arthropoda
- Class: Insecta
- Order: Hymenoptera
- Family: Ichneumonidae
- Genus: Diadegma
- Species: D. clavicorne

Binomial name
- Diadegma clavicorne (Brischke, 1880)

Species of wasp

Diadegma clavicorne is a wasp first described by Carl Gustav Alexander Brischke in 1880. No subspecies are listed.
