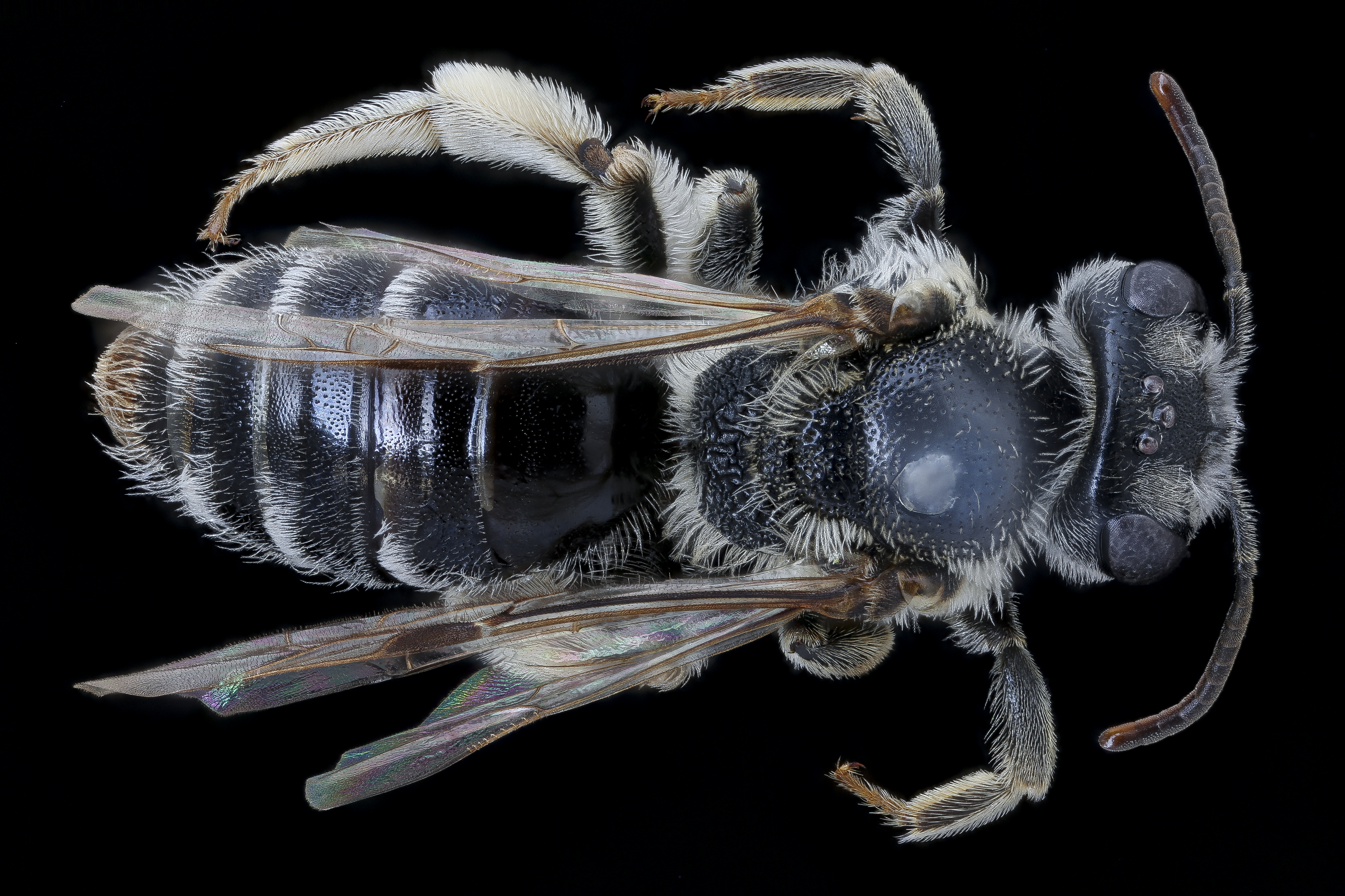

Scientific classification
- Kingdom: Animalia
- Phylum: Arthropoda
- Class: Insecta
- Order: Hymenoptera
- Family: Andrenidae
- Genus: Andrena
- Species: A. rehni

Binomial name
- Andrena rehni Viereck, 1904

= Andrena rehni =

Miner bee species in the family Andrenidae

Andrena rehni, or Rehn's miner bee, is an oligolectic species of miner bee in the family Andrenidae. It is found in North America and was discovered by Henry Lorenz Viereck in 1907. The specific name honours James A. G. Rehn. Andrena rehni is a solitary, ground-nesting bee.

The species is associated with the American chestnut, which has become functionally extinct in its former distribution along the Appalachian Mountains due to the introduction of chestnut blight. As a result of the decline of the tree, Rehn's miner bee, which fed on its blossoms, has become increasingly rare. The reported range of Andrena rehni also overlapped with the range of the American chestnut; early entomologists noted that specimens were collected from flowering chestnut trees. The species had not been documented in nearly a century until it was rediscovered on an Allegheny chinkapin, a shrubby species related to the chestnut, in 2018 in Maryland by Sam Droege of the U.S. Geological Survey. Prior to the rediscovery of Andrena rehni, the American chestnut was believed to be wind-pollinated. Andrena rehni is now understood as a chestnut (including other species of the Castanea genus) pollen specialist; given the range of the American chestnut prior to the blight, it is probable that Andrena rehni was also widespread in the eastern United States.

Since its rediscovery, it has since been identified in five other states, including the state of New York after a 119-year absence. Prior to its discovery in New York in 2023, it was last seen in Orange County on 3 July 1904. In 2019, it was identified in an orchard of transgenic American chestnuts in Connecticut after a 49-year absence. The following year, it was found on Mount Ella in Monson, Massachusetts in a forest where one of the 2011 New England tornadoes had opened a hole in the forest canopy and young chestnut trees were flowering.

Andrena rehni is currently listed on the Connecticut bee inventory as a species of "special conservation status". It is also listed as one of the high priority species of greatest conservation need by the New York State Department of Environmental Conservation.

The lifecycle of Andrena rehni has evolved to coincide with that of the American chestnut. It is active during the short window when the tree is in bloom from late June to late July, where it builds an underground nest and produces young. Of the species identified in the New York survey, all were female A. rehni foraging for pollen (rather than nectar) on newly maturing chestnut catkins.
