= Diadegma discoocellellae =

Scientific classification
- Domain: Eukaryota
- Kingdom: Animalia
- Phylum: Arthropoda
- Class: Insecta
- Order: Hymenoptera
- Family: Ichneumonidae
- Genus: Diadegma
- Species: D. discoocellellae

Binomial name
- Diadegma discoocellellae (Viereck, 1911)

Species of wasp

Diadegma discoocellellae is a wasp first described by Henry Lorenz Viereck in 1911.
