= Diadegma maurum =

Scientific classification
- Domain: Eukaryota
- Kingdom: Animalia
- Phylum: Arthropoda
- Class: Insecta
- Order: Hymenoptera
- Family: Ichneumonidae
- Genus: Diadegma
- Species: D. maurum

Binomial name
- Diadegma maurum (Gravenhorst, 1829)

Species of wasp

Diadegma maurum is a wasp first described by Johann Ludwig Christian Gravenhorst in 1829. It is a member of the genus Diadegma and family Ichneumonidae. No subspecies are listed.
