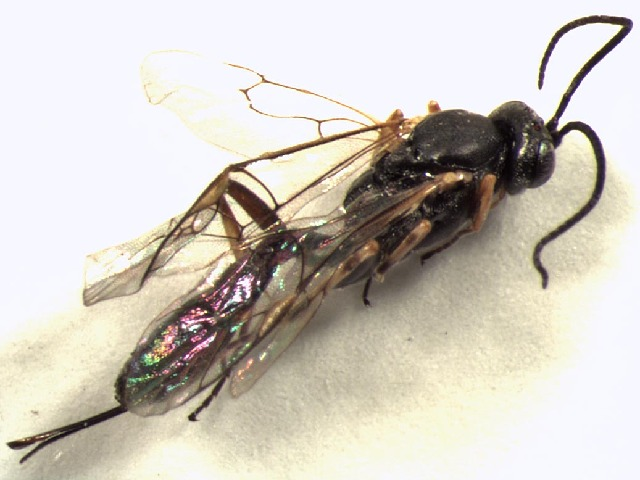

Scientific classification
- Domain: Eukaryota
- Kingdom: Animalia
- Phylum: Arthropoda
- Class: Insecta
- Order: Hymenoptera
- Family: Ichneumonidae
- Genus: Diadegma
- Species: D. majale

Binomial name
- Diadegma majale (Gravenhorst, 1829)

= Diadegma majale =

Species of wasp

Diadegma majale is a wasp first described by Johann Ludwig Christian Gravenhorst in 1829. It is a member of the genus Diadegma and family Ichneumonidae. It inhabits Sweden. No subspecies are listed.
