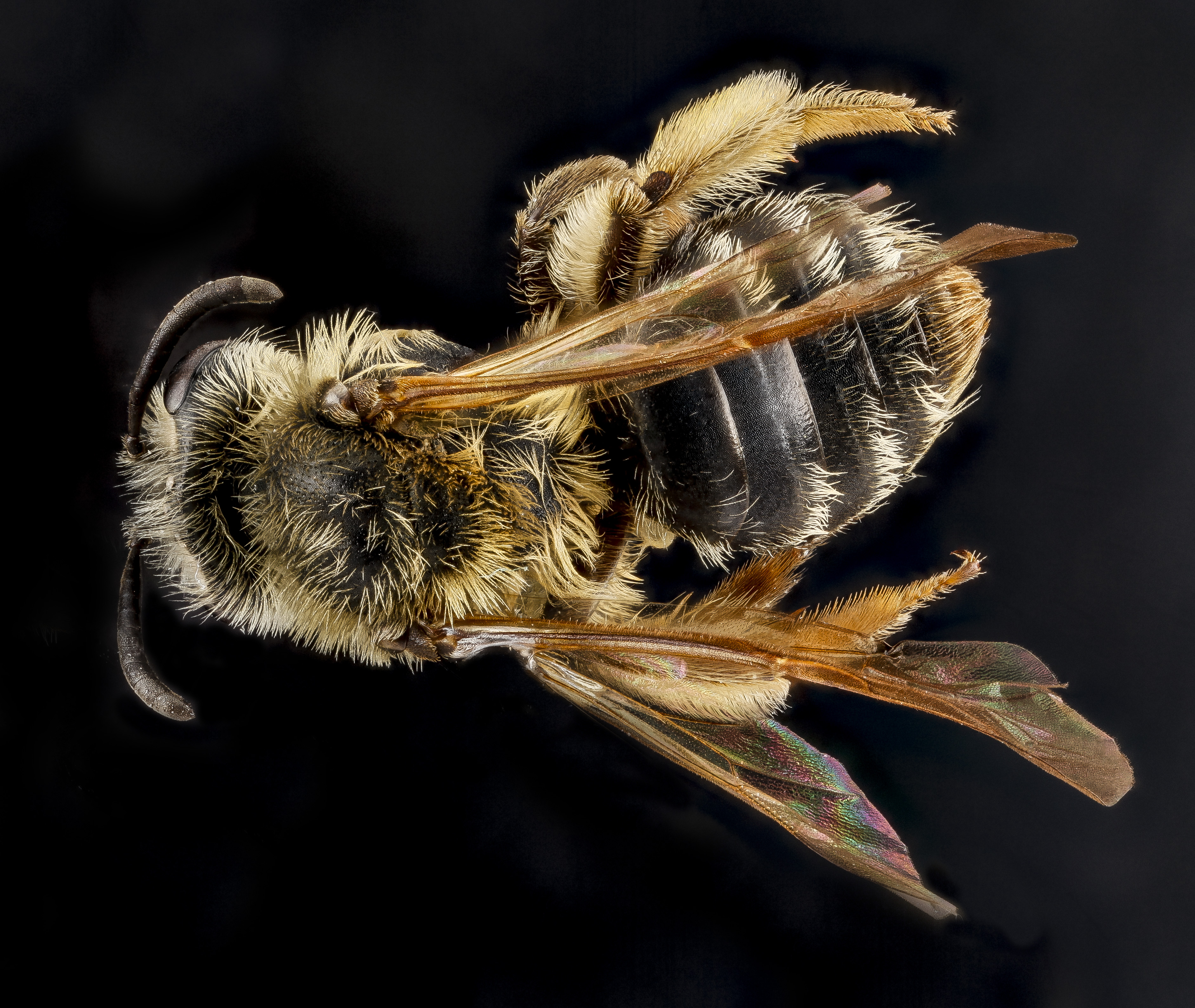

Scientific classification
- Kingdom: Animalia
- Phylum: Arthropoda
- Clade: Pancrustacea
- Class: Insecta
- Order: Hymenoptera
- Family: Andrenidae
- Genus: Andrena
- Species: A. bisalicis

Binomial name
- Andrena bisalicis Viereck, 1908

= Andrena bisalicis =

Species of bee

The eastern willow miner bee (Andrena bisalicis) is a species of miner bee in the family Andrenidae. It is found in North America.
