= Diadegma armillatum =

- A close up of the Diadegma armillatum wasp

Scientific classification
- Kingdom: Animalia
- Phylum: Arthropoda
- Clade: Pancrustacea
- Class: Insecta
- Order: Hymenoptera
- Family: Ichneumonidae
- Genus: Diadegma
- Species: D. armillatum

Binomial name
- Diadegma armillatum (Gravenhorst, 1829)

Synonyms
- Diadegma pseudocombinatum (Szepligeti, 1916); Diadegma tibiale (Gravenhorst, 1829)

Species of wasp

Diadegma armillatum is a wasp first described by Johann Ludwig Christian Gravenhorst in 1829. The species is native to Sweden.

== Subspecies ==
The species is divided into the following subspecies:

- Diadegma armillatum turcicum
- Diadegma armillatum aegyptiator
- Diadegma armillatum rufum
