= Diadegma albicalcar =

Scientific classification
- Domain: Eukaryota
- Kingdom: Animalia
- Phylum: Arthropoda
- Class: Insecta
- Order: Hymenoptera
- Family: Ichneumonidae
- Genus: Diadegma
- Species: D. albicalcar

Binomial name
- Diadegma albicalcar (Morley, 1913)

Species of wasp

Diadegma albicalcar is a wasp first described by Morley in 1913. No subspecies are listed.
