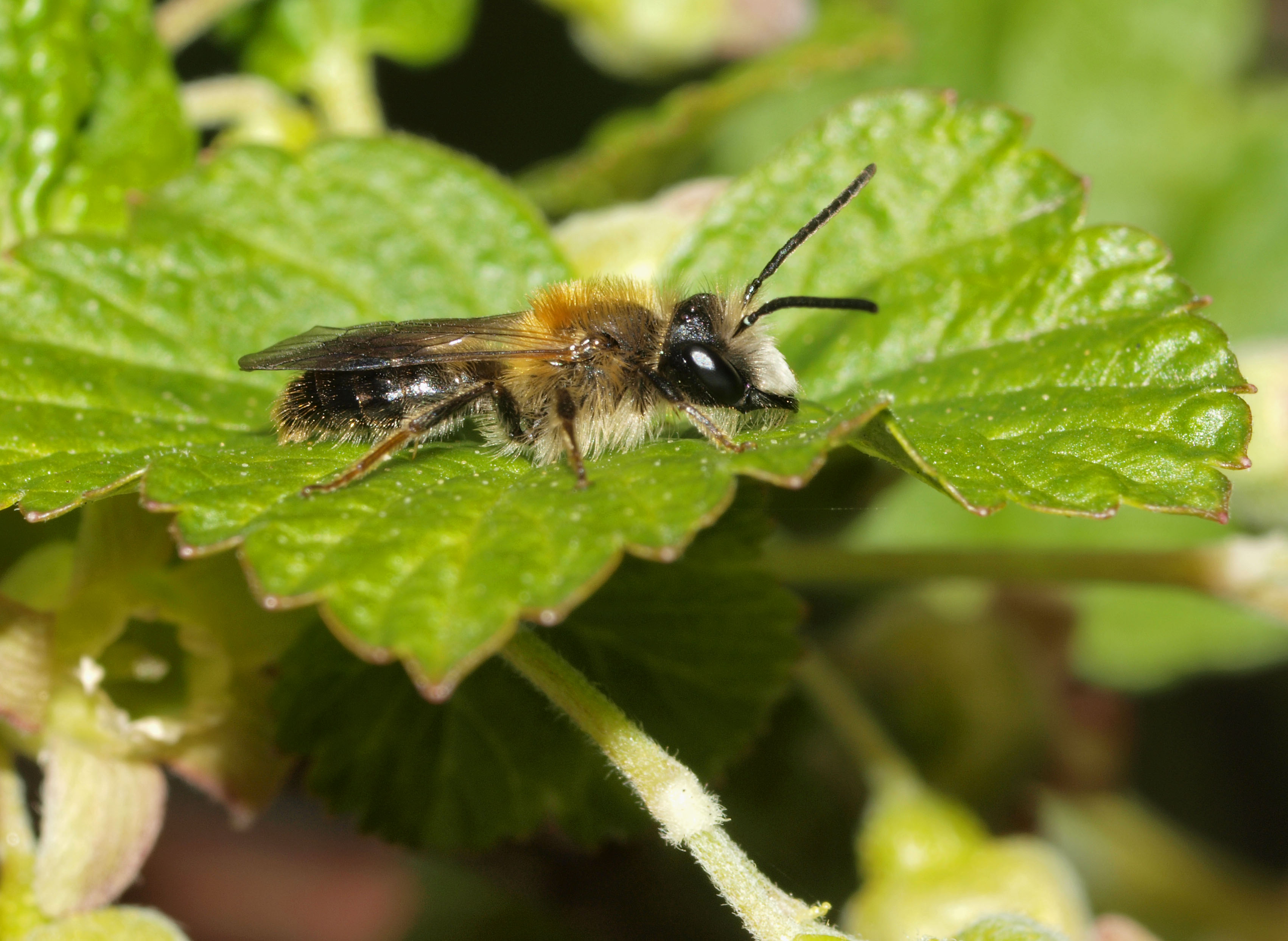
- Andrena helvola male Denmark

Scientific classification
- Kingdom: Animalia
- Phylum: Arthropoda
- Clade: Pancrustacea
- Class: Insecta
- Order: Hymenoptera
- Family: Andrenidae
- Genus: Andrena
- Species: A. helvola

Binomial name
- Andrena helvola (Linnaeus, 1758)

Synonyms
- Apis helvola Linnaeus, 1758; Melitta subdentata Kirby, 1802

= Andrena helvola =

Species of bee

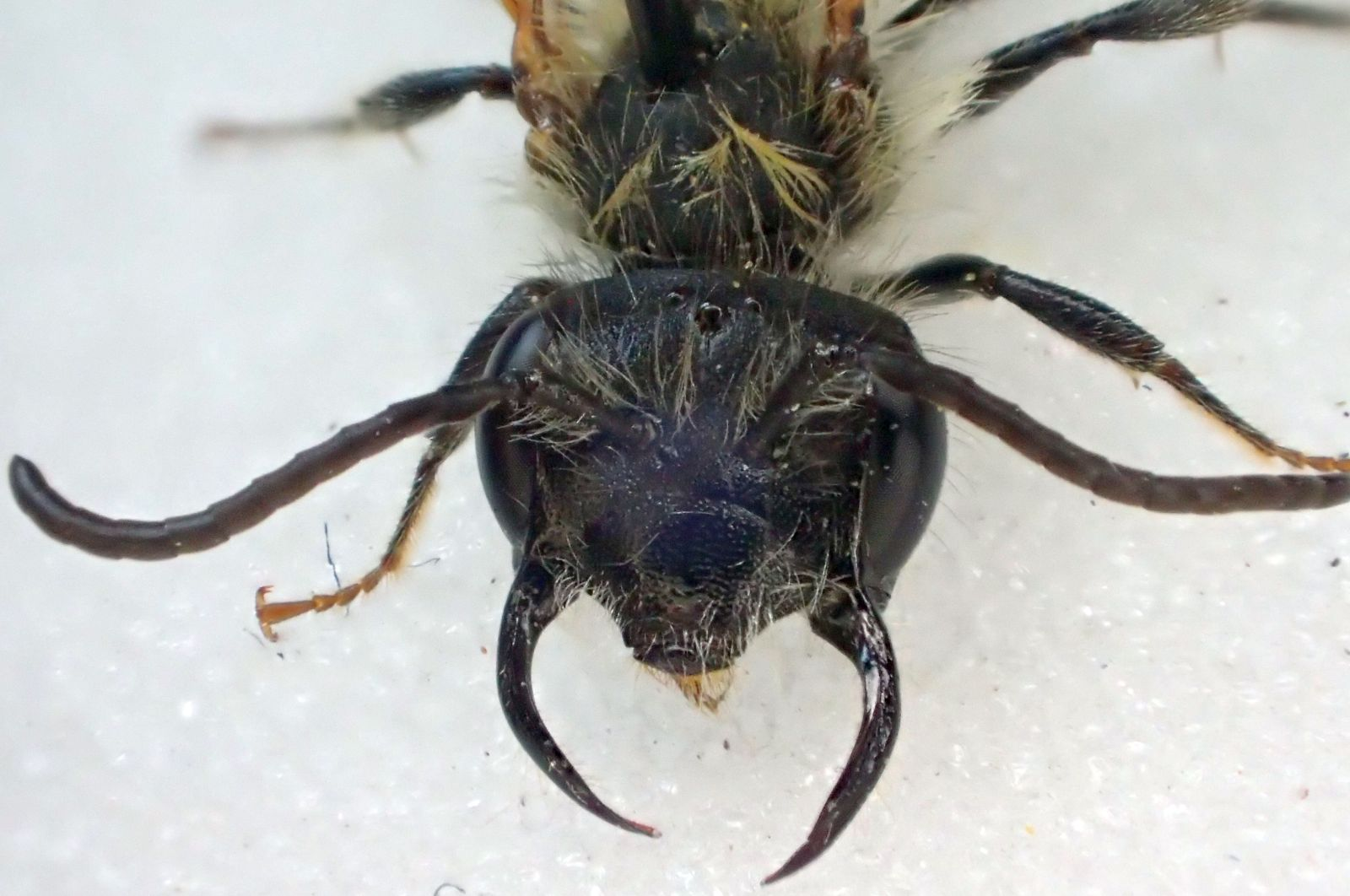
Andrena helvola male has very long mandibles

Andrena helvola , the coppice mining bee, is a Palearctic species of mining bee from the genus Andrena.

== Description ==
Andrena helvola is a medium-sized bee, the females are larger than the males with a forewing length of 9 to 10 mm (0.35 to 0.39 in) while in the smaller males the forewings are 6.5 to 8.5 mm (0.26 to 0.33 in) with the larger males being more robust with bigger heads than the smaller individuals. The females have a pile of reddish-brown hair on the top of the thorax with a rather thick pile of orange or yellowish hair on the first and second tergites and a short grey pile on the third and fourth tergites.

== Taxonomy ==
Andrena helvola was first formally described in 1758 as Apis helvola by Carl Linnaeus. In 1775 Fabricius described the genus Andrena and in 1912 Viereck designated A. helvola as its type species.

== Distribution and habitat ==
Andrena helvola is found in the Western Palearctic from Great Britain to Russia, north to southern Scandinavia and south to the Pyrenees, Alps, the Balkans and Anatolia. In Great Britain is mainly found in southern England and Wales with scattered occurrences into Scotland. It is found in deciduous woodland growing on a number of different types of soil.

== Biology ==
Andrena helvola is a solitary bee which nests singly or in loose aggregations. Its nests are parasitised by the cuckoo bee Nomada panzeri and the males are known to be parasitised by the fly, Stylops nevinsonii. It is a polylectic species and has been recorded feeding on nectar and collecting pollen from the flowers of wood spurge (Euphorbia amygdaloides), field maple (Acer campestre), hawthorn (Crataegus spp) and holly (Ilex aquifolium), as well as bird cherry (Prunus padus), cherry plum (Prunus cerasifera), white willow (Salix alba) and dandelions (Taraxacum spp.). It is a univoltine bee which is active from April up to June in Great Britain between April and June.
