= Diadegma compressum =

Scientific classification
- Domain: Eukaryota
- Kingdom: Animalia
- Phylum: Arthropoda
- Class: Insecta
- Order: Hymenoptera
- Family: Ichneumonidae
- Genus: Diadegma
- Species: D. compressum

Binomial name
- Diadegma compressum (Cresson, 1864)

Synonyms
- Diadegma ruficoxale (Viereck, 1925); Diadegma oedemisiformis (Viereck, 1917); Diadegma paenerivale (Viereck, 1906); Diadegma ferrugineipes (Ashmead, 1890)

Species of wasp

Diadegma compressum is a wasp first described by Cresson in 1864. No subspecies are listed.
