= Diadegma mandschukuonum =

Scientific classification
- Domain: Eukaryota
- Kingdom: Animalia
- Phylum: Arthropoda
- Class: Insecta
- Order: Hymenoptera
- Family: Ichneumonidae
- Genus: Diadegma
- Species: D. mandschukuonum

Binomial name
- Diadegma mandschukuonum Uchida, 1942

Synonyms
- Diadegma nordorientale (Chao, 1983)

Species of wasp

Diadegma mandschukuonum is a wasp first described by Uchida in 1942. It is a member of the genus Diadegma and family Ichneumonidae. No subspecies are listed.
