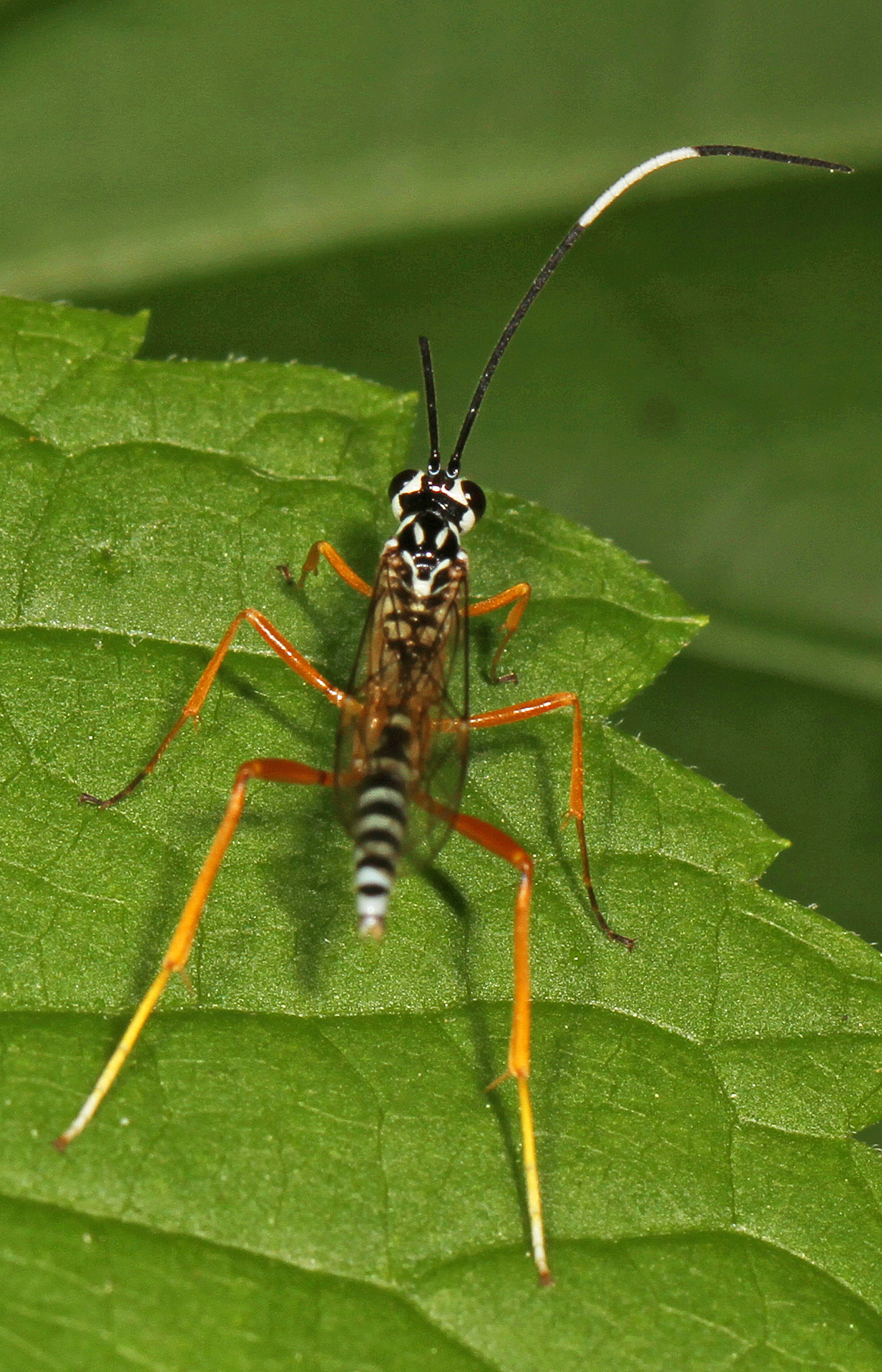

Scientific classification
- Kingdom: Animalia
- Phylum: Arthropoda
- Class: Insecta
- Order: Hymenoptera
- Family: Ichneumonidae
- Genus: Polycyrtus
- Species: P. neglectus

Binomial name
- Polycyrtus neglectus Cushman, 1926

= Polycyrtus neglectus =

Species of wasp

Polycyrtus neglectus is a species of ichneumon wasp in the family Ichneumonidae.

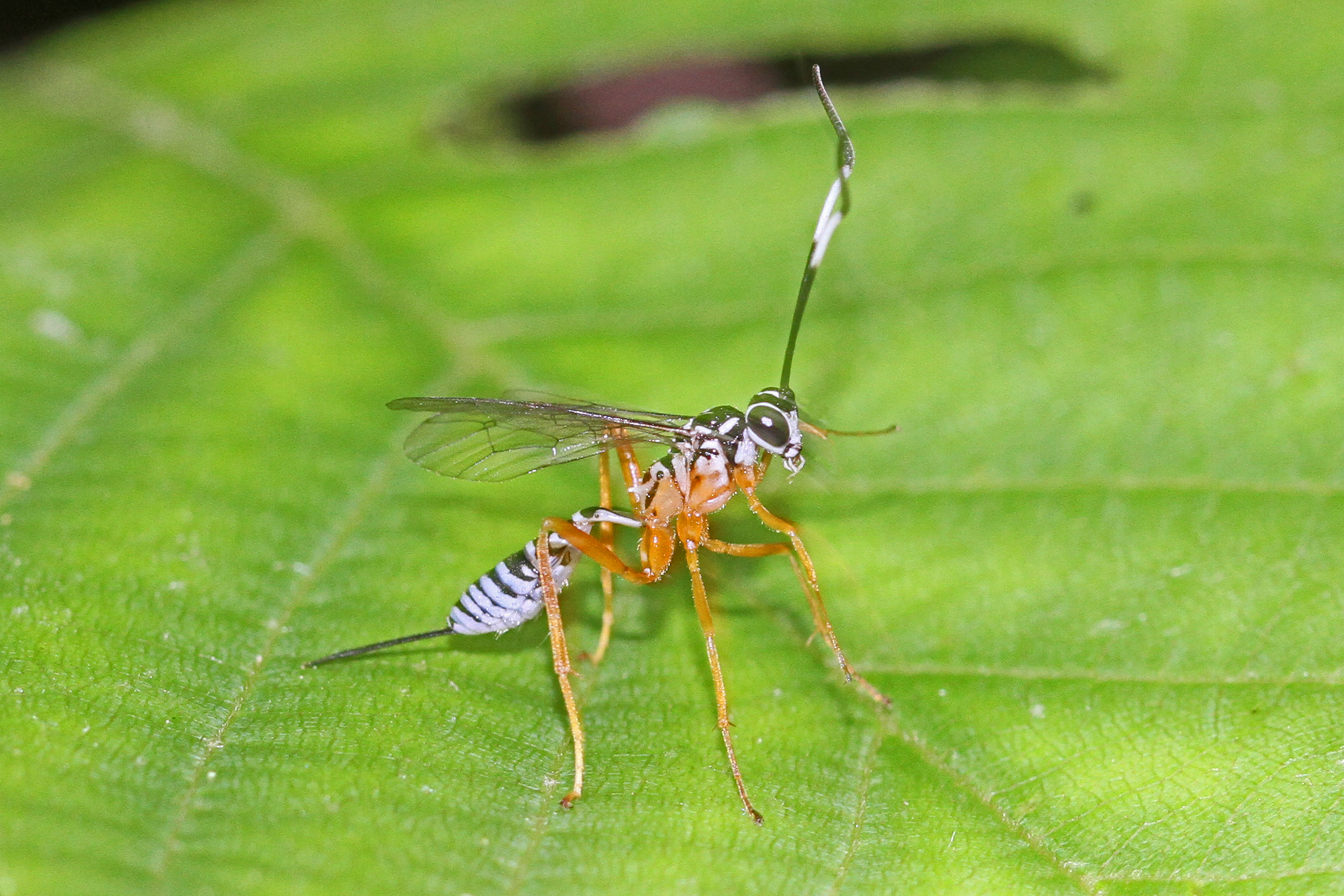
