= Diadegma albotibiale =

Scientific classification
- Domain: Eukaryota
- Kingdom: Animalia
- Phylum: Arthropoda
- Class: Insecta
- Order: Hymenoptera
- Family: Ichneumonidae
- Genus: Diadegma
- Species: D. albotibiale

Binomial name
- Diadegma albotibiale Horstmann, 1973

Species of wasp

Diadegma albotibiale is a wasp first described by Horstmann in 1973. No subspecies are listed.
