= Diadegma dispar =

Scientific classification
- Domain: Eukaryota
- Kingdom: Animalia
- Phylum: Arthropoda
- Class: Insecta
- Order: Hymenoptera
- Family: Ichneumonidae
- Genus: Diadegma
- Species: D. dispar

Binomial name
- Diadegma dispar (Gmelin, 1790)

Species of wasp

Diadegma dispar is a wasp first described by Johann Friedrich Gmelin in 1790.
