= Diadegma major =

Scientific classification
- Domain: Eukaryota
- Kingdom: Animalia
- Phylum: Arthropoda
- Class: Insecta
- Order: Hymenoptera
- Family: Ichneumonidae
- Genus: Diadegma
- Species: D. major

Binomial name
- Diadegma major Szépligeti, 1916

Species of wasp

Diadegma major is a wasp first described by G. Szépligeti in 1916. It is a member of the genus Diadegma and family Ichneumonidae. No subspecies are listed.
