= Diadegma crassulum =

Scientific classification
- Domain: Eukaryota
- Kingdom: Animalia
- Phylum: Arthropoda
- Class: Insecta
- Order: Hymenoptera
- Family: Ichneumonidae
- Genus: Diadegma
- Species: D. crassulum

Binomial name
- Diadegma crassulum Walley, 1967

Species of wasp

Diadegma crassulum is a wasp first described by Walley in 1967. No subspecies are listed.
