= Diadegma coleophorarum =

Scientific classification
- Domain: Eukaryota
- Kingdom: Animalia
- Phylum: Arthropoda
- Class: Insecta
- Order: Hymenoptera
- Family: Ichneumonidae
- Genus: Diadegma
- Species: D. coleophorarum

Binomial name
- Diadegma coleophorarum (Ratzeburg, 1852)

Species of wasp

Diadegma coleophorarum is a wasp first described by Julius Theodor Christian Ratzeburg in 1852. No subspecies are listed.
