= Diadegma areolare =

Scientific classification
- Domain: Eukaryota
- Kingdom: Animalia
- Phylum: Arthropoda
- Class: Insecta
- Order: Hymenoptera
- Family: Ichneumonidae
- Genus: Diadegma
- Species: D. areolare

Binomial name
- Diadegma areolare (Holmgren, 1860)

Species of wasp

Diadegma areolare is a wasp first described by August Emil Holmgren in 1860. No subspecies are listed.
