= Diadegma akoense =

Scientific classification
- Domain: Eukaryota
- Kingdom: Animalia
- Phylum: Arthropoda
- Class: Insecta
- Order: Hymenoptera
- Family: Ichneumonidae
- Genus: Diadegma
- Species: D. akoense

Binomial name
- Diadegma akoense (Shiraki, 1917)

Species of wasp

Diadegma akoense is a wasp first described by Tokuichi Shiraki in 1917. No subspecies are listed.
