= Diadegma blackburni =

Scientific classification
- Domain: Eukaryota
- Kingdom: Animalia
- Phylum: Arthropoda
- Class: Insecta
- Order: Hymenoptera
- Family: Ichneumonidae
- Genus: Diadegma
- Species: D. blackburni

Binomial name
- Diadegma blackburni (Cameron, 1883)

Synonyms
- Diadegma hawaiiense (Cameron, 1886)

Species of wasp

Diadegma blackburni, also known as Diadegma hawaiiense, is a wasp first described by Cameron in 1883. No subspecies are listed.
