= Diadegma meridionator =

Scientific classification
- Domain: Eukaryota
- Kingdom: Animalia
- Phylum: Arthropoda
- Class: Insecta
- Order: Hymenoptera
- Family: Ichneumonidae
- Genus: Diadegma
- Species: D. meridionator

Binomial name
- Diadegma meridionator Aubert, 1971

Species of wasp

Diadegma meridionator is a wasp first described by Aubert in 1971. It is a member of the genus Diadegma and family Ichneumonidae. No subspecies are listed.
