= Diadegma argentellae =

Scientific classification
- Domain: Eukaryota
- Kingdom: Animalia
- Phylum: Arthropoda
- Class: Insecta
- Order: Hymenoptera
- Family: Ichneumonidae
- Genus: Diadegma
- Species: D. argentellae

Binomial name
- Diadegma argentellae Horstmann, 2004

Species of wasp

Diadegma argentellae is a wasp first described by Horstmann in 2004. No subspecies are listed.
