= Polycyrtus vierecki =

Scientific classification
- Domain: Eukaryota
- Kingdom: Animalia
- Phylum: Arthropoda
- Class: Insecta
- Order: Hymenoptera
- Family: Ichneumonidae
- Genus: Polycyrtus
- Species: P. vierecki

Binomial name
- Polycyrtus vierecki Townes, 1966

Synonyms
- Cryptanuridimorpha elegans Viereck, 1913; Polycyrtus elegans (Viereck, 1913) Provancher, 1888

Species of wasp

Polycyrtus vierecki is a species of wasp in the subfamily Cryptinae. It is found in Peru.
