= Diadegma albipes =

Scientific classification
- Domain: Eukaryota
- Kingdom: Animalia
- Phylum: Arthropoda
- Class: Insecta
- Order: Hymenoptera
- Family: Ichneumonidae
- Genus: Diadegma
- Species: D. albipes

Binomial name
- Diadegma albipes Horstmann, 1981

Species of wasp

Diadegma albipes is a wasp first described by Horstmann in 1981. No subspecies are listed.
