= Diadegma crataegi =

Scientific classification
- Domain: Eukaryota
- Kingdom: Animalia
- Phylum: Arthropoda
- Class: Insecta
- Order: Hymenoptera
- Family: Ichneumonidae
- Genus: Diadegma
- Species: D. crataegi

Binomial name
- Diadegma crataegi Horstmann, 1980

Species of wasp

Diadegma crataegi is a wasp first described by Horstmann in 1980. No subspecies are listed.
