= Diadegma curvicaudis =

Scientific classification
- Domain: Eukaryota
- Kingdom: Animalia
- Phylum: Arthropoda
- Class: Insecta
- Order: Hymenoptera
- Family: Ichneumonidae
- Genus: Diadegma
- Species: D. curvicaudis

Binomial name
- Diadegma curvicaudis (Szepligeti, 1916)

Species of wasp

Diadegma curvicaudis is a wasp first described by Szepligeti in 1916. No subspecies are listed.
