= Diadegma chrysostictum =

Scientific classification
- Domain: Eukaryota
- Kingdom: Animalia
- Phylum: Arthropoda
- Class: Insecta
- Order: Hymenoptera
- Family: Ichneumonidae
- Genus: Diadegma
- Species: D. chrysostictum

Binomial name
- Diadegma chrysostictum (Gmelin, 1790)

Species of wasp

Diadegma chrysostictum is a wasp first described by Johann Friedrich Gmelin in 1790. Its range includes Sweden. No subspecies are listed.
