= Diadegma combinatum =

Scientific classification
- Domain: Eukaryota
- Kingdom: Animalia
- Phylum: Arthropoda
- Class: Insecta
- Order: Hymenoptera
- Family: Ichneumonidae
- Genus: Diadegma
- Species: D. combinatum

Binomial name
- Diadegma combinatum (Holmgren, 1860)

Synonyms
- Diadegma alpinator Aubert, 1970; Diadegma angustum (Kokujev, 1915); Diadegma femoratum (Kokujev, 1915)

Species of wasp

Diadegma combinatum is a wasp first described by Holmgren in 1860. No subspecies are listed.
