= Diadegma adelungi =

Scientific classification
- Domain: Eukaryota
- Kingdom: Animalia
- Phylum: Arthropoda
- Class: Insecta
- Order: Hymenoptera
- Family: Ichneumonidae
- Genus: Diadegma
- Species: D. adelungi

Binomial name
- Diadegma adelungi (Kokujev, 1915)

Synonyms
- Diadegma flaviscapus (Kokujev, 1915)

Species of wasp

Diadegma adelungi is a wasp first described by Kokujev in 1915. No subspecies are listed.
