= Diadegma balticum =

Scientific classification
- Domain: Eukaryota
- Kingdom: Animalia
- Phylum: Arthropoda
- Class: Insecta
- Order: Hymenoptera
- Family: Ichneumonidae
- Genus: Diadegma
- Species: D. balticum

Binomial name
- Diadegma balticum Horstmann, 1969

Species of wasp

Diadegma balticum is a wasp first described by Horstmann in 1969. No subspecies are listed.
