= Diadegma melanium =

Scientific classification
- Kingdom: Animalia
- Phylum: Arthropoda
- Clade: Pancrustacea
- Class: Insecta
- Order: Hymenoptera
- Family: Ichneumonidae
- Genus: Diadegma
- Species: D. melanium

Binomial name
- Diadegma melanium Thomson, 1887

Species of wasp

Diadegma melanium is a wasp first described by Carl Gustaf Thomson in 1887. It is a member of the genus Diadegma and family Ichneumonidae. It inhabits Sweden. No subspecies are listed. It is a parasitoid of Bucculatrix noltei.
