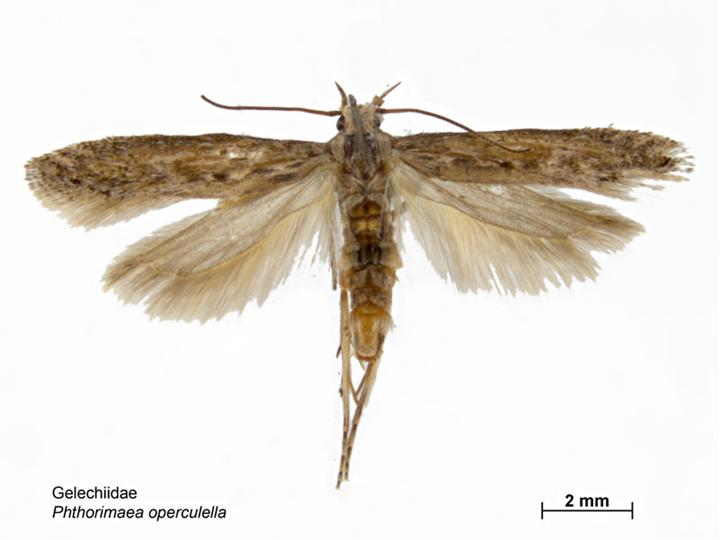
- Dorsal view
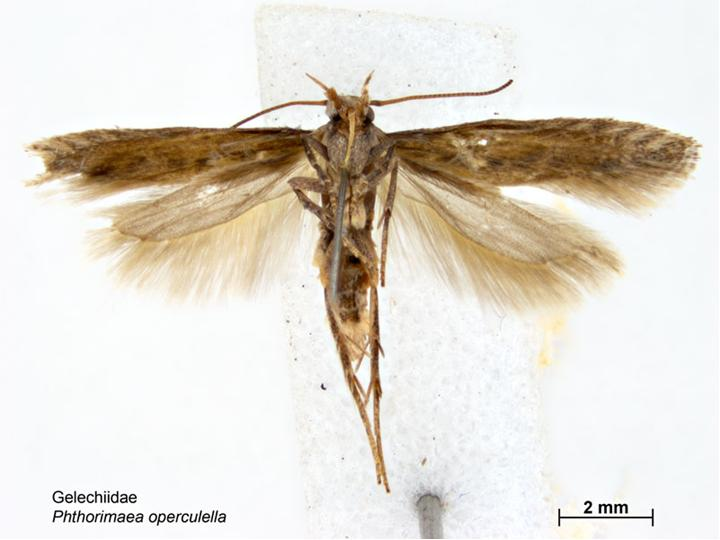
- Ventral view

Scientific classification
- Kingdom: Animalia
- Phylum: Arthropoda
- Clade: Pancrustacea
- Class: Insecta
- Order: Lepidoptera
- Family: Gelechiidae
- Genus: Phthorimaea
- Species: P. operculella

Binomial name
- Phthorimaea operculella (Zeller, 1873)

Synonyms
- Gelechia terrella Walker, 1864; Gelechia operculella Zeller, 1873; Gnorimoschema operculella; Gelechia sedata Butler, 1880; Parasia sedata; Bryotropha solanella Boisduval, 1874; Gelechia tabacella Ragonot, 1879; Gelechia piscipellis Howard, 1897; Phthorimaea argentinae Povolný, 1989

= Phthorimaea operculella =

Potato tuber moth

Species of moth

Phthorimaea operculella, also known as the potato tuber moth or tobacco splitworm, is a moth of the family Gelechiidae. It is an oligophagous insect that feeds on the plant family Solanaceae and is especially known for being a major pest of potato crops. Currently farmers utilize insecticides, parasites, and sprinkler irrigation in order to prevent P. operculella from infesting their croplands.

The potato tuber moth also has a rare oviposition process where the ovipositor contains sensors that pick up on chemical signals given off by the host plant. Therefore, the adult female moth only needs to be within the vicinity of a host plant to lay her eggs.

== Description ==
The potato tuber moth has a body length of about 10mm and a wingspan of about 12mm. Adult moths have a narrow, light brown body with grayish-brown wings containing a variety of small dark spots. The moth contains two sets of wings, both having frayed edges. Females are distinguished from males by having a black “X” pattern on their forewings when their wings are closed.

== Geographic range ==
P. operculella can be found worldwide but prefer subtropical, tropical, and mediterranean climates. In the United States, P. operculella have been spotted in at least 25 states, especially along the Atlantic and Pacific coast. The potato tuber moth is also commonly found in Africa, Asia, Europe, South America, and Oceania. In total, the moth has been reported in more than 90 countries.

== Habitat ==
The potato tuber moth typically lives in areas near potatoes or within the vicinity of their host plant family, Solanaceae. Temperature is an important factor in the survival rate and development of P. operculella, and so they are typically found in warmer climates, preferring subtropical and tropical habitats.

== Food resources ==
Potato tuber moth larvae are known for feeding on the tubers, roots, and foliage (on which they are leafminers) of potato plants (Solanum tuberosum). However, larvae are only able to locate potato tubers if the tubers are exposed or within 1 cm of the soil surface. There is no evidence that newly hatched larvae would burrow down and locate tubers using the root system. On foliage, the larvae mainly feed on the mesophyll, leaving brown or white spots in the leaves, known as blotch mines. The potato tuber moth has been found to feed on various members of the family Solanaceae such as tobacco plants (Nicotiana tabacum), eggplants (Solanum melongena), tomatoes (Lycopersicon esculentum), and bell peppers (Capsicum annuum).

== Parental care ==
=== Oviposition ===
The ovipositor of the P. operculella is approximately 1.5mm in length and 0.3mm in width. On either side of the ovipositor are approximately 30-40 tapering hairs that range from 0.03-0.3mm in length. At the tip of the ovipositor are more smaller hairs that are spaced evenly over the area.

The female potato tuber moth does not require to be on top of or inside a host plant in order to mate and lay eggs. However, full fecundity is only achieved when the moth is in the vicinity of a preferred host plant. Female adult moths look for surface depressions (cracks) that are just large enough to contain her eggs, typically 0.2-0.5 mm squared. Hairy and textured surfaces are preferred over smooth and waxy surfaces. Females also strongly prefer dry places to lay her eggs and studies have shown that total number of eggs laid is reduced in the presence of moist surfaces. Shade is also preferred over bright light.

Experiments published in the Entomological Society of America conducted on adult potato tuber moths have shown that the number of eggs a female contains at emergence is less than the total number of eggs laid over the total lifespan and therefore further maturation of eggs takes place during the adult life phase and depends on the amount of resources, such as food and water, that the adult is able to forage.

=== Host plant selection ===
Adult female moths prefer to oviposit on host plants from the family Solanaceae. The ovipositor contains both mechano and chemo-sensory receptors that look for certain chemical factors from plants in order to help the female moth determine which plants are preferred. A study by P. G. Fenemore from Massey University shows that potato tuber moths are drawn to an amino acid in potatoes called L-glutamic acid and that this plays a key role in helping determine plant selection for oviposition.

== Life cycle ==
=== Egg ===
Adult female P. operculella can lay over 200 eggs over their lifespan, depending on environmental conditions. The eggs are typically oval in shape, smooth, and have a pearly white to yellowish color. The eggs usually take around five days to hatch. The eggs can be laid on the soil next to a preferred host plant, but they are typically laid next to a vein on the leaf, between the bud and the stem, or underneath the stem.

=== Larvae ===
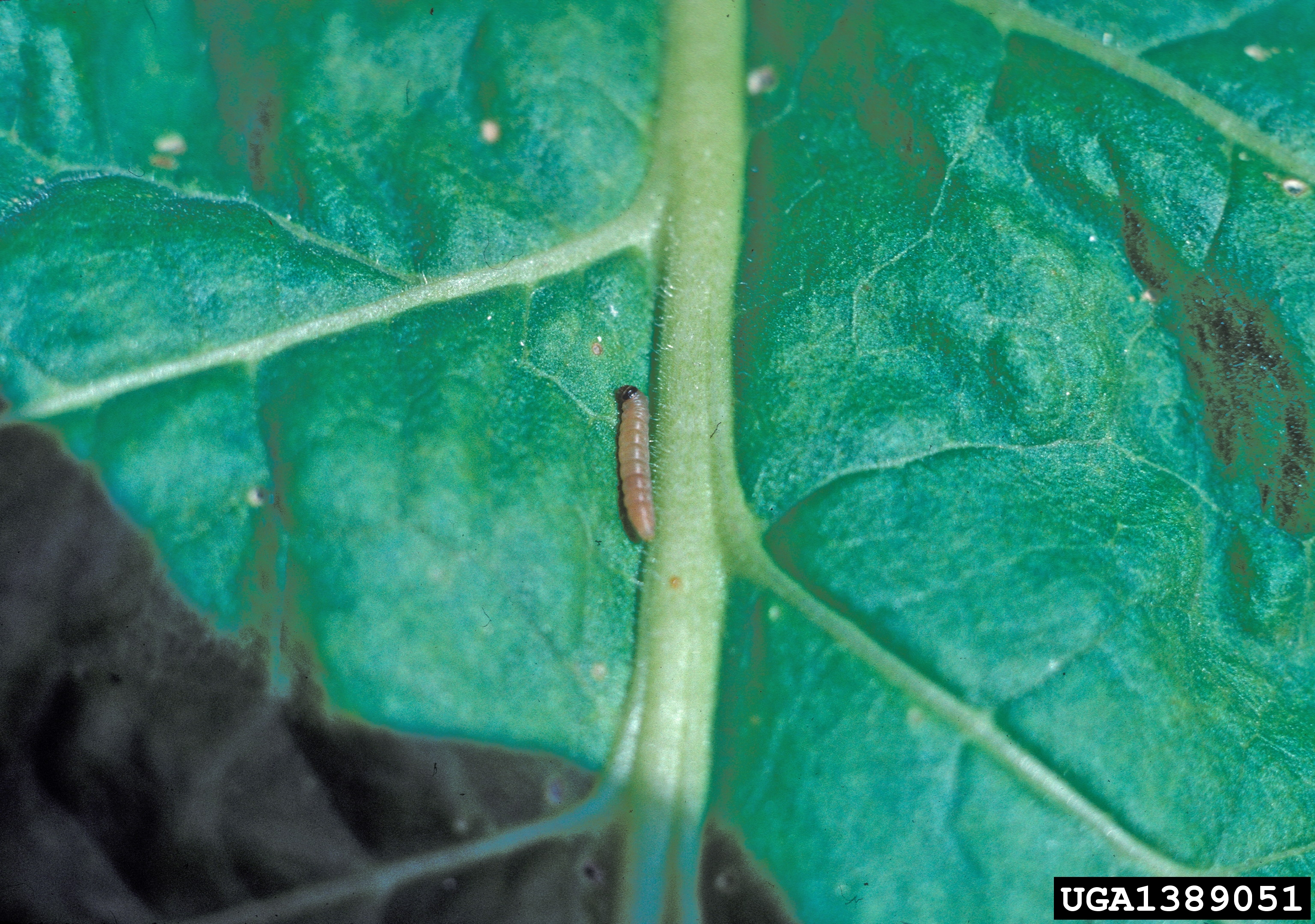
Larva

Potato tuber moth larvae are typically 12-15mm long and are white or yellow with a brown head and prothorax. As the larvae matures, its color changes from white/yellow to pink/green. The thorax contains small black spots as well as bristles on each segment, and the larvae typically feeds on its host plant for up to two weeks before pupation.

In order for the larvae to determine if it wants to mine a particular host plant, it first spends 5–15 minutes walking around the leaves, attaching a thread of silk to the surface as it goes. The larvae makes small changes in direction as it walks and occasionally bites the leaf four to five times. Once it selects a location to mine, the larvae proceeds to build a silk roof around the area and then begins to mine downwards, placing the pieces of leaf to the side of the hole.

On non-host plants, the larvae makes fewer test bites and silk deposits. On average, the larvae walks faster on a non-host plant compared to a preferred host plant and if it reaches the edge of the leaf will leave the plant all together instead of turning around.

=== Pupae ===
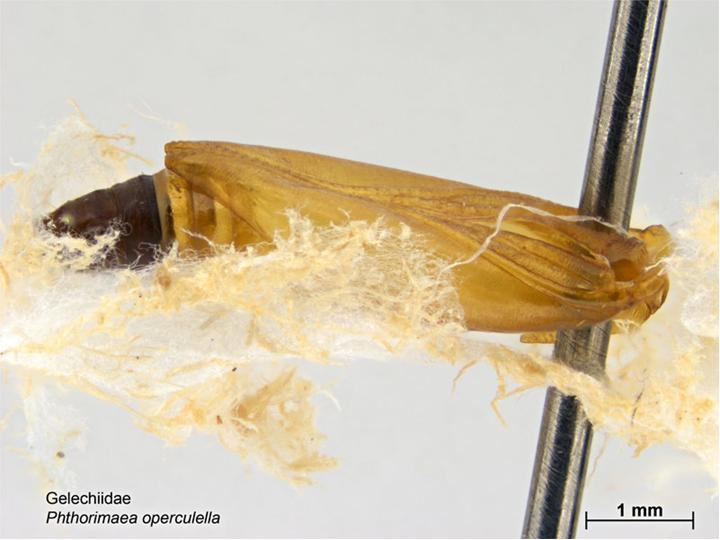
Cocoon

The pupae of P. operculella are narrow in width and typically 0.5 inches in length. They are usually white in color and will take 10–30 days to develop, depending on environmental conditions.

=== Adult ===
Adult potato tuber moths are nocturnal and typically are not active until 1–2 hours after sunset. At first they were thought to be poor fliers until a study by Foley in 1985 showed that they are actually capable of flying for over 5 hours and 10 kilometers non-stop in laboratory conditions. P. operculella commonly live for 1–2 weeks. Mating begins around 24 hours after emergence and most eggs are laid within the first quarter of the female's life. Peak oviposition for females occurs 2–5 days after emergence and declines to much lower levels by day 7.

== Enemies ==
=== Parasites ===
The larval parasitoid wasp Apanteles subandinus was introduced as a possible strategy to control P. operculella infestations. The parasite kills the moth towards the end of its larvae stage and has been found to be successful in controlling foliar infestations of the potato tuber moth. In South Africa, the spider Selenops radiatus has proved to be an effective controlling agent for this species. The wasp Diadegma mollipla, which exists in South Africa as well, is another parasitoid of the moth's larvae.

== Mating ==
=== Male/Female interactions ===
Female potato tuber moths release a sex pheromone to attract males that has been shown to be composed of tridecadienyl and tridecatrienyl acetates. Males that sense this pheromone typically display wing fanning behavior and walk in a “zig-zagging” route towards the source.

== Interactions with humans ==
=== Pest of crop plants ===
The larvae of the potato tuber moths can be very damaging to potato crops as well as tobacco and tomato plants. The larvae will eat away at the foliage and then proceed to eat away at the tubers as well, preventing the plant from growing. At times, the larvae will eat through the potatoes themselves making them unsellable to consumers. Insecticides are commonly used to prevent and kill off potato tuber larvae but they are only effective against foliar infestations and not against infested tubers. Larval parasites such as Apanteles subandinus have also been successful in controlling foliar infestations but unfortunately do not have any significant impact on tuber infestations. The best solution to prevent the larvae from eating away at the tubers is with sprinkler irrigation as it deters the adult female moths from ovipositing.
