= Diadegma agens =

Scientific classification
- Domain: Eukaryota
- Kingdom: Animalia
- Phylum: Arthropoda
- Class: Insecta
- Order: Hymenoptera
- Family: Ichneumonidae
- Genus: Diadegma
- Species: D. agens

Binomial name
- Diadegma agens Townes, 1964

Species of wasp

Diadegma agens is a wasp first described by Henry Keith Townes, Jr. in 1964. No subspecies are listed.
