= Diadegma aztecum =

Scientific classification
- Domain: Eukaryota
- Kingdom: Animalia
- Phylum: Arthropoda
- Class: Insecta
- Order: Hymenoptera
- Family: Ichneumonidae
- Genus: Diadegma
- Species: D. aztecum

Binomial name
- Diadegma aztecum (Cameron, 1904)

Species of wasp

Diadegma aztecum is a wasp first described by Cameron in 1904. No subspecies are listed.
