= Liolaemus gravenhorstii =

Conservation status
- Endangered (IUCN 3.1)

Scientific classification
- Kingdom: Animalia
- Phylum: Chordata
- Class: Reptilia
- Order: Squamata
- Suborder: Iguania
- Family: Liolaemidae
- Genus: Liolaemus
- Species: L. gravenhorstii

Binomial name
- Liolaemus gravenhorstii (Gray, 1845)

Synonyms
- Leiodera gravenhorstii Gray, 1845; Proctotretus stantoni Girard, 1855; Ptychodeira stantoni — Girard, 1858; Liolaemus gravenhorstii — Boulenger, 1885; Liolaemus stantoni — Boulenger, 1885; Liolaemus gravenhorstii — Donoso-Barros, 1996

Species of lizard

Liolaemus gravenhorstii, commonly known as Gravenhorst's tree iguana, is a species of lizard in the family Liolaemidae. The species is endemic to South America.

== Etymology ==
The specific name, gravenhorstii, is in honor of German herpetologist Johann Ludwig Christian Gravenhorst.

== Geographic range ==
As of 2023, L. gravenhorstii is found in central Chile and differs from the two populations reported by Cei and Videla (2001) for Argentina, which may belong to another species. In Chile, L. gravenhorstii has confirmed distribution records for the Región Metropolitana and potential records for the O'Higgins and Valparaíso regions.
