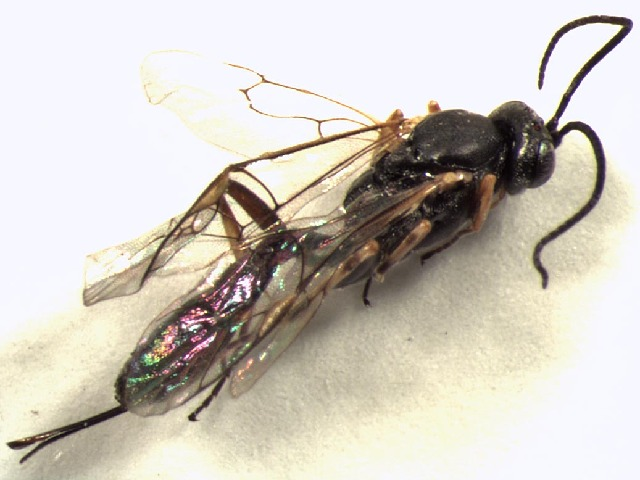
- Diadegma majale

Scientific classification
- Domain: Eukaryota
- Kingdom: Animalia
- Phylum: Arthropoda
- Class: Insecta
- Order: Hymenoptera
- Family: Ichneumonidae
- Tribe: Limneriini
- Genus: Diadegma; Förster, 1869

= Diadegma =

Genus of wasps

Diadegma is a genus of wasps described by Förster in 1869. Diadegma is part of the family Ichneumonidae.

== Species of Diadegma ==
- Diadegma acronyctae
- Diadegma aculeatum
- Diadegma acutum
- Diadegma adelungi
- Diadegma aegyptiacum
- Diadegma aestivale
- Diadegma agens
- Diadegma agile
- Diadegma akoense
- Diadegma albertae
- Diadegma albicalcar
- Diadegma albicinctum
- Diadegma albipes
- Diadegma albotibiale
- Diadegma alpicola
- Diadegma amphipoeae
- Diadegma angitiaeforma
- Diadegma angulator
- Diadegma annulicrus
- Diadegma antennaellae
- Diadegma anurum
- Diadegma areolare
- Diadegma areolator
- Diadegma argentellae
- Diadegma argyloplocevora
- Diadegma armillatum (Diadegma pseudocombinatum)
- Diadegma auranticolor
- Diadegma auricellae
- Diadegma aztecum
- Diadegma balticum
- Diadegma basale
- Diadegma blackburni (Diadegma hawaiiense)
- Diadegma boreale
- Diadegma brevipetiolatum
- Diadegma brevivalve (Diadegma valachicum)
- Diadegma buckelli
- Diadegma californicum
- Diadegma callisto
- Diadegma capense
- Diadegma carolina
- Diadegma chrysostictos (Diadegma bakeri, Diadegma corsicator, Diadegma costatum, Diadegma curtum, Diadegma galleriae, Diadegma incipiens, Diadegma kiehtani, Diadegma orientator, Diadegma petiolatum, Diadegma quinquerufum, Diadegma triangulare, Diadegma woonandi)
- Diadegma chrysostictum
- Diadegma cinnabaritor
- Diadegma claripenne
- Diadegma clavicorne
- Diadegma coleophorarum
- Diadegma colutellae
- Diadegma combinatum (Diadegma alpinator, Diadegma angustum, Diadegma femoratum)
- Diadegma compressum (Diadegma ruficoxale, Diadegma oedemisiformis, Diadegma paenerivale, Diadegma ferrugineipes)
- Diadegma comptoniellae (Diadegma digitatum)
- Diadegma consumtor (Diadegma alpestrator, Diadegma varians)
- Diadegma contractum
- Diadegma crassicorne (Diadegma normannicum, Diadegma brevicorne, Diadegma carnifex)
- Diadegma crassiseta
- Diadegma crassulum
- Diadegma crassum
- Diadegma crataegi
- Diadegma curvicaudis
- Diadegma cylindricum
- Diadegma defectivum
- Diadegma densepilosellum
- Diadegma dinianator
- Diadegma discoocellellae
- Diadegma dispar
- Diadegma dominans
- Diadegma duplicatum
- Diadegma elegans
- Diadegma elishae
- Diadegma elongatum
- Diadegma epinotiae
- Diadegma erraticum
- Diadegma erucator
- Diadegma erythropoda
- Diadegma erythropus
- Diadegma exareolator
- Diadegma fabricianae
- Diadegma falciferum
- Diadegma fenestrale
- Diadegma filicorne
- Diadegma filiformator
- Diadegma flavoclypeatum
- Diadegma flavotibiale
- Diadegma flexum
- Diadegma fugitivum
- Diadegma fulvipalpe
- Diadegma fumatum
- Diadegma fungicola
- Diadegma gallicator
- Diadegma gibbulum
- Diadegma glabriculum
- Diadegma gracile
- Diadegma gracillimum
- Diadegma grisescens
- Diadegma groenlandicum
- Diadegma hiraii
- Diadegma hispanicum
- Diadegma hokkaidense
- Diadegma holopygum
- Diadegma hospitum
- Diadegma hygrobium
- Diadegma imbecillum
- Diadegma incompletum
- Diadegma insectator
- Diadegma insulare
- Diadegma integrator
- Diadegma ishiyamanum
- Diadegma johanseni
- Diadegma koizumii
- Diadegma kozlovi
- Diadegma kyffhusanae
- Diadegma kyushuense
- Diadegma lactibiator
- Diadegma laricinellum
- Diadegma laterale
- Diadegma laticeps
- Diadegma latungula
- Diadegma ledicola
- Diadegma leontiniae
- Diadegma lithocolletis
- Diadegma litorale
- Diadegma longicauda
- Diadegma longicaudatum
- Diadegma luffiae
- Diadegma lugubre
- Diadegma lyonetiae
- Diadegma maculatum
- Diadegma majale
- Diadegma major
- Diadegma mandschukuonum (Diadegma nordorientale)
- Diadegma maurum
- Diadegma mediterraneum
- Diadegma melanium
- Diadegma meliloti
- Diadegma meridionator
- Diadegma micrurum
- Diadegma minutum
- Diadegma mollipla
- Diadegma monospilum
- Diadegma moraguesi
- Diadegma muelleri
- Diadegma nanus
- Diadegma narcyiae
- Diadegma neocerophagum
- Diadegma neomajale
- Diadegma nepalense
- Diadegma nervosae
- Diadegma nigridens
- Diadegma nigrifemur
- Diadegma nigriscapus
- Diadegma nigrostigmaticum
- Diadegma nigrum
- Diadegma novaezealandiae
- Diadegma obliteratellum
- Diadegma obscurum
- Diadegma occultum
- Diadegma openangorum
- Diadegma operculellae
- Diadegma oranginator
- Diadegma paenesessile
- Diadegma paludis
- Diadegma parviforme
- Diadegma parvum
- Diadegma patruele
- Diadegma pattoni
- Diadegma pendulum
- Diadegma pilosum
- Diadegma pini
- Diadegma polonicum
- Diadegma psilocorsis
- Diadegma pulchripes
- Diadegma pulicalvariae
- Diadegma pulicator
- Diadegma pusio
- Diadegma pyreneator
- Diadegma rapi
- Diadegma rectificator
- Diadegma retusa
- Diadegma rufatum
- Diadegma ruficeps
- Diadegma rufigaster
- Diadegma salicis
- Diadegma sanguinicoxa
- Diadegma satanicolor
- Diadegma scotiae
- Diadegma semiclausum
- Diadegma simile
- Diadegma simplificator
- Diadegma solum
- Diadegma sordipes
- Diadegma speculare
- Diadegma spurcum
- Diadegma stagnale
- Diadegma stenosomum
- Diadegma stigmatellae
- Diadegma suecicum
- Diadegma tamariscator
- Diadegma tenuipes
- Diadegma trachas
- Diadegma transversale
- Diadegma trichopterorum
- Diadegma trichoptilus
- Diadegma tripunctatum
- Diadegma trochanteratum
- Diadegma truncatum
- Diadegma undulator
- Diadegma ungavae
- Diadegma valesiator
- Diadegma variegatum
- Diadegma velox
- Diadegma villosulum
- Diadegma zaydamense

== Gallery ==
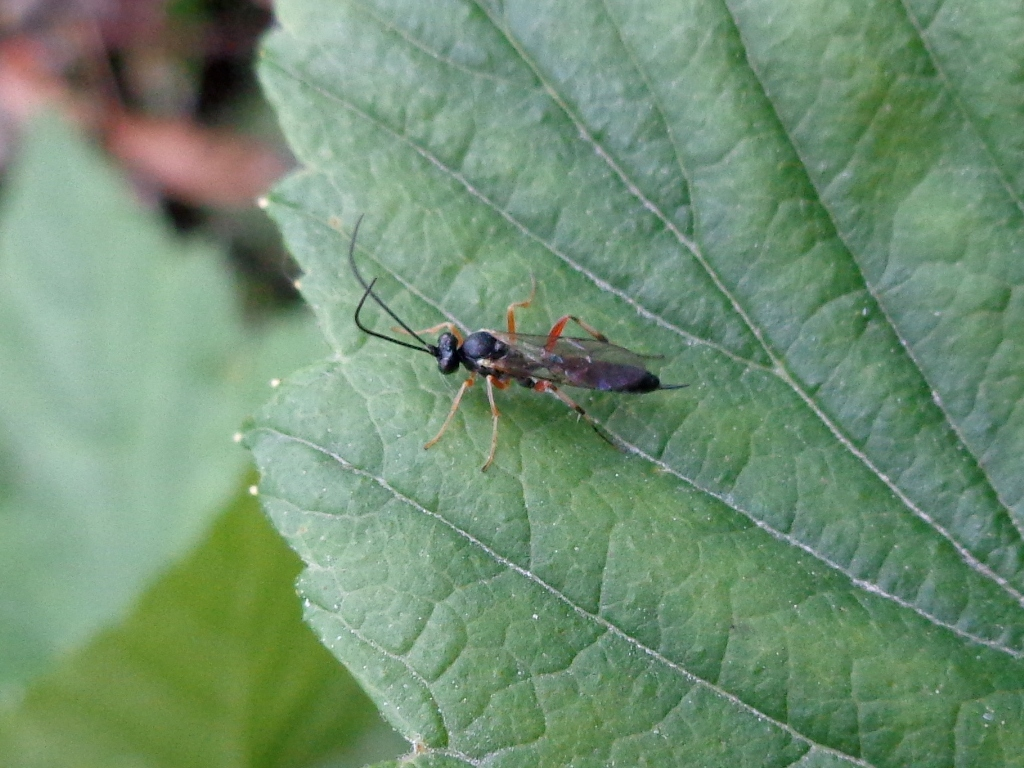

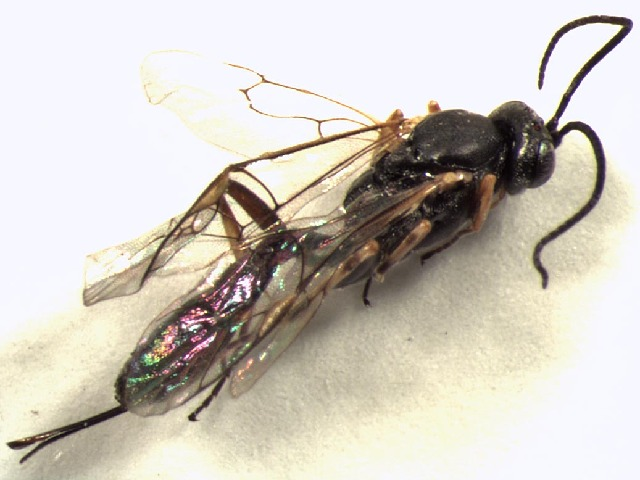

== See also ==
- Parasitoid wasp
