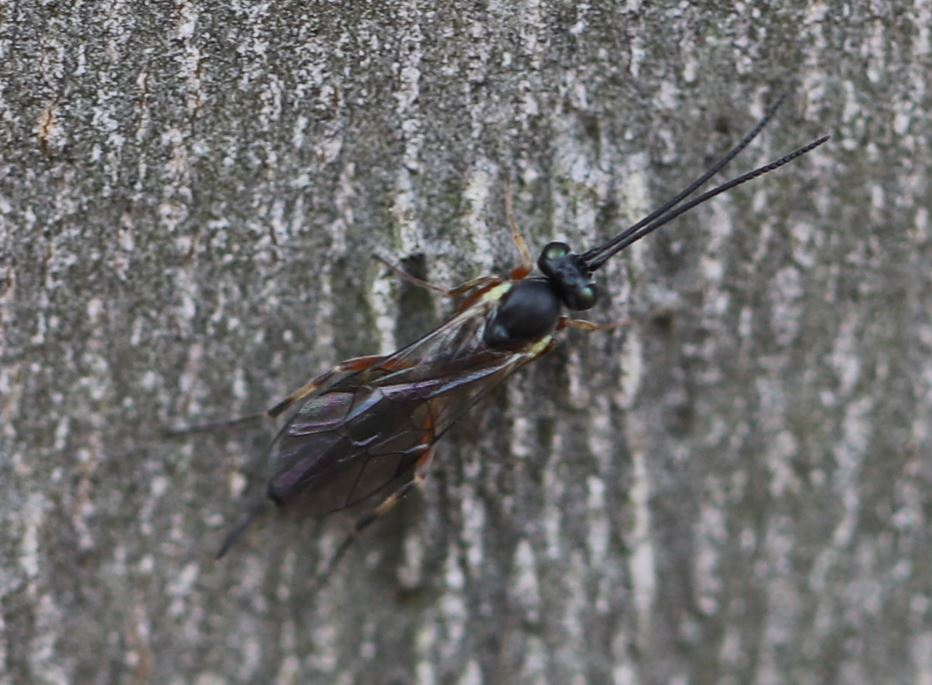

Scientific classification
- Kingdom: Animalia
- Phylum: Arthropoda
- Class: Insecta
- Order: Hymenoptera
- Family: Ichneumonidae
- Genus: Diadegma
- Species: D. semiclausum

Binomial name
- Diadegma semiclausum (Hellén, 1949)

Synonyms
- Angitia semiclausum Hellén, 1949; Diadegma eucerophagum Horstmann, 1969; Diadegma xylostellae Kusigemati, 1988

= Diadegma semiclausum =

Species of parasitic wasp

Diadegma semiclausum is a species of parasitic wasp in the family Ichneumonidae. Its larvae are parasites of the larvae of the diamondback moth (Plutella xylostella) and certain other moths.

== Distribution and habitat ==
Diadegma semiclausum is native to Europe but has spread to, or been introduced to, other parts of the world, including Asia, Egypt, South Africa, Hawaii, Australia and New Zealand. Its preferred temperature range is between 15 and 25 °C (59 and 77 °F), so in tropical countries it is found in cooler climates at higher altitudes. It is attracted to cruciferous vegetables on which diamondback moth larvae are feeding, responding to chemical cues released by the larvae and the damaged tissues. It also parasitises the leek moth (Acrolepiopsis assectella).

== Life cycle ==
The adult female Diadegma semiclausum searches out first instar larvae of its host and lays a single egg inside; it does not lay an egg if the larva has already been parasitised. The female wasp can lay several hundred eggs over the course of about three weeks if it finds sufficient nectar or other sugary food to sustain it. When the egg hatches, the wasp larva feeds inside the moth larva, and when the moth larva makes a cocoon, the wasp larva pupates inside. It emerges after eight to ten days, leaving a dry husk behind. The whole cycle takes about 19 days.

== Use in biological control ==
In the Philippines, cabbages, Chinese cabbages, radishes and other cruciferous vegetables are important crops, and the most serious pest of these is the diamondback moth. The moths used to be kept under control by pesticides, with an average of twelve sprayings per crop being used; more recently, the pest has become largely resistant to insecticides, so that some farmers are abandoning the crops entirely. The main natural enemy of the diamondback moth in the Philippines is the parasitoid wasp Cotesia vestalis, but overuse of insecticides limits this parasite's effectiveness. To supplement its limited control, Diadegma semiclausum has been introduced from Taiwan and effective control of the diamondback moth was reported to have increased to as much as 95%. However the use of insecticide has to be moderated otherwise the wasps will not survive, with the bacterium Bacillus thuringiensis being an acceptable alternative. The population of the parasitoids is also limited by hyperparasitism, where secondary parasitic wasps start to parasitise the primary parasites.
