= Diadegma auricellae =

Scientific classification
- Domain: Eukaryota
- Kingdom: Animalia
- Phylum: Arthropoda
- Class: Insecta
- Order: Hymenoptera
- Family: Ichneumonidae
- Genus: Diadegma
- Species: D. auricellae

Binomial name
- Diadegma auricellae Horstmann, 2008

Species of wasp

Diadegma auricellae is a wasp first described by Horstmann in 2008. No subspecies are listed.
