= Diadegma aculeatum =

Scientific classification
- Domain: Eukaryota
- Kingdom: Animalia
- Phylum: Arthropoda
- Class: Insecta
- Order: Hymenoptera
- Family: Ichneumonidae
- Genus: Diadegma
- Species: D. aculeatum

Binomial name
- Diadegma aculeatum (Bridgman, 1889)

Synonyms
- Diadegma politor (Aubert, 1960); Diadegma atrum (Kokujev, 1915)

Species of wasp

Diadegma aculeatum is a wasp first described by Bridgman in 1889. It inhabits Sweden. No subspecies are listed.
