= Diadegma aegyptiacum =

Scientific classification
- Domain: Eukaryota
- Kingdom: Animalia
- Phylum: Arthropoda
- Class: Insecta
- Order: Hymenoptera
- Family: Ichneumonidae
- Genus: Diadegma
- Species: D. aegyptiacum

Binomial name
- Diadegma aegyptiacum Horstmann, 1993

Species of wasp

Diadegma aegyptiacum is a wasp first described by Horstmann in 1993. No subspecies are listed. It is a parasitoid of Cryptoblabes gnidiella caterpillars.
