= Diadegma densepilosellum =

Scientific classification
- Domain: Eukaryota
- Kingdom: Animalia
- Phylum: Arthropoda
- Class: Insecta
- Order: Hymenoptera
- Family: Ichneumonidae
- Genus: Diadegma
- Species: D. densepilosellum

Binomial name
- Diadegma densepilosellum (Cameron, 1911)

Species of insect

Diadegma densepilosellum is a wasp first described by Cameron in 1911. No subspecies are listed.
