= Diadegma basale =

Scientific classification
- Kingdom: Animalia
- Phylum: Arthropoda
- Clade: Pancrustacea
- Class: Insecta
- Order: Hymenoptera
- Family: Ichneumonidae
- Genus: Diadegma
- Species: D. basale

Binomial name
- Diadegma basale Horstmann, 1980

Species of wasp

Diadegma basale is a wasp first described by Horstmann in 1980. No sub-species are listed.
