= Diadegma callisto =

Scientific classification
- Domain: Eukaryota
- Kingdom: Animalia
- Phylum: Arthropoda
- Class: Insecta
- Order: Hymenoptera
- Family: Ichneumonidae
- Genus: Diadegma
- Species: D. callisto

Binomial name
- Diadegma callisto Horstmann, 1993

Species of wasp

Diadegma callisto is a wasp first described by Horstmann in 1993. No subspecies are listed.
