= Diadegma mediterraneum =

Scientific classification
- Domain: Eukaryota
- Kingdom: Animalia
- Phylum: Arthropoda
- Class: Insecta
- Order: Hymenoptera
- Family: Ichneumonidae
- Genus: Diadegma
- Species: D. mediterraneum

Binomial name
- Diadegma mediterraneum Constantineanu, 1930

Species of wasp

Diadegma mediterraneum is a wasp first described by Constantineanu in 1930. It is a member of the genus Diadegma and family Ichneumonidae. No subspecies are listed.
