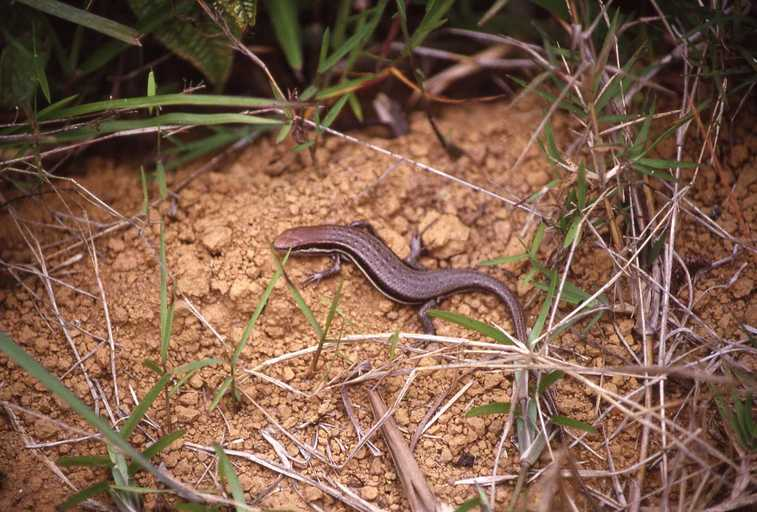

Conservation status
- Least Concern (IUCN 3.1)

Scientific classification
- Kingdom: Animalia
- Phylum: Chordata
- Class: Reptilia
- Order: Squamata
- Family: Scincidae
- Genus: Trachylepis
- Species: T. gravenhorstii

Binomial name
- Trachylepis gravenhorstii (A.M.C. Duméril & Bibron, 1839)
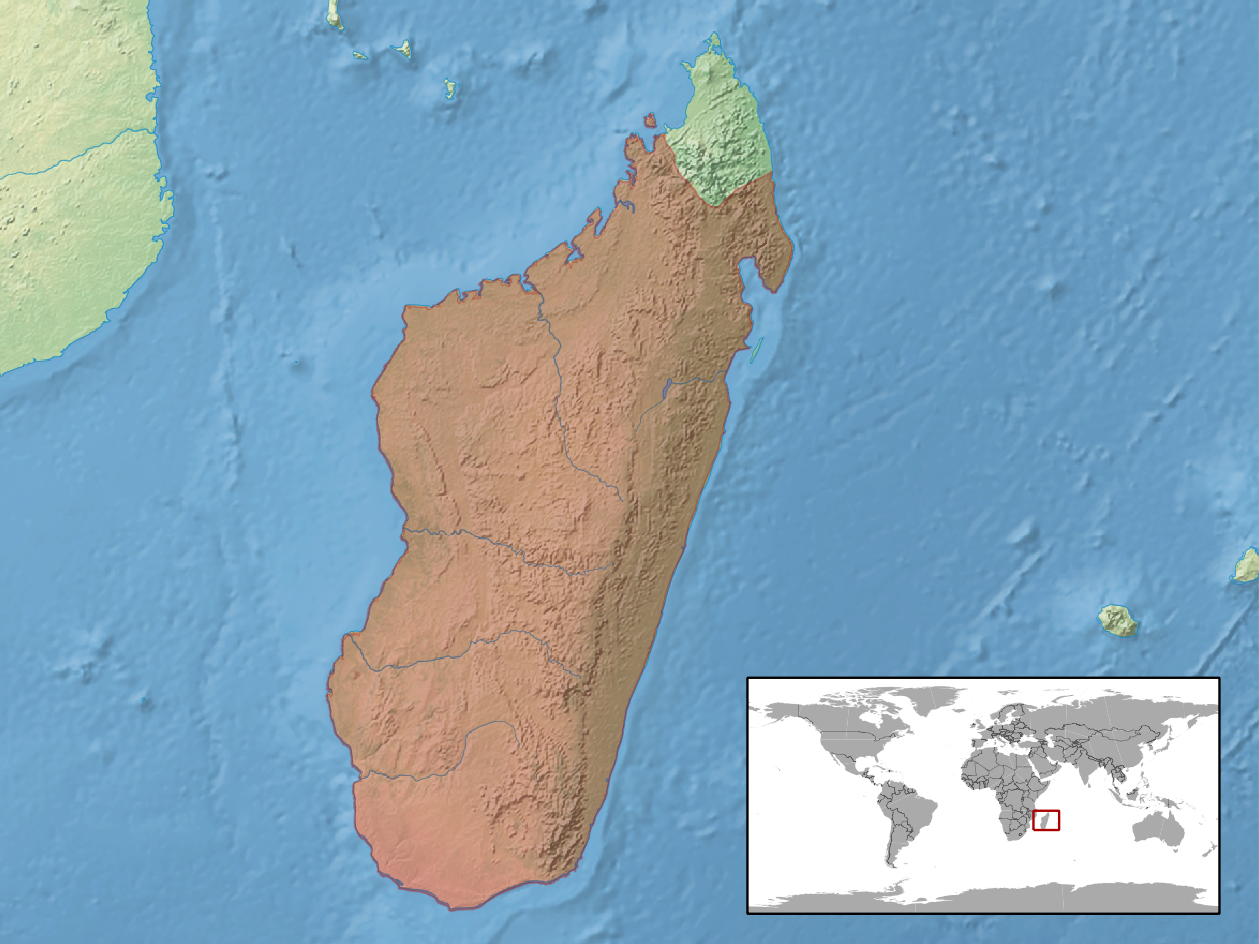

Synonyms
- Euprepes gravenhorstii A.M.C. Duméril & Bibron, 1839; Mabuia gravenhorstii — Boulenger, 1887; Mabuya gravenhorstii — Angel, 1942; Euprepis gravenhorstii — Mausfeld & Schmitz, 2003; Trachylepis gravenhorstii — Bauer, 2003

= Trachylepis gravenhorstii =

Species of lizard

Trachylepis gravenhorstii, also known commonly as Gravenhorst's mabuya, is a species of skink, a lizard in the family Scincidae. The species is endemic to Madagascar.

== Etymology ==
The specific name, gravenhorstii, is in honor of German zoologist Johann Ludwig Christian Gravenhorst.

== Habitat ==
The preferred natural habitats of T. gravenhorstii are rocky areas, grassland, shrubland, and forest, but is also found in coffee plantations and ylang-ylang plantations.

== Description ==
T gravenhorstii may attain a snout-to-vent length (SVL) of 7 cm (2.8 in), and a total length (including tail) of 18 cm (7.1 in).

== Reproduction ==
T. gravenhorstii is oviparous.
