= Diadegma crassum =

Scientific classification
- Domain: Eukaryota
- Kingdom: Animalia
- Phylum: Arthropoda
- Class: Insecta
- Order: Hymenoptera
- Family: Ichneumonidae
- Genus: Diadegma
- Species: D. crassum

Binomial name
- Diadegma crassum (Bridgman, 1889)

Species of wasp

Diadegma crassum is a wasp first described by Bridgman 1889. No subspecies are listed.
