= Diadegma areolator =

Scientific classification
- Domain: Eukaryota
- Kingdom: Animalia
- Phylum: Arthropoda
- Class: Insecta
- Order: Hymenoptera
- Family: Ichneumonidae
- Genus: Diadegma
- Species: D. areolator

Binomial name
- Diadegma areolator Aubert, 1974

Species of wasp

Diadegma areolator is a wasp first described by Aubert in 1974. No subspecies are listed.
