= Diadegma dinianator =

Scientific classification
- Domain: Eukaryota
- Kingdom: Animalia
- Phylum: Arthropoda
- Class: Insecta
- Order: Hymenoptera
- Family: Ichneumonidae
- Genus: Diadegma
- Species: D. dinianator

Binomial name
- Diadegma dinianator Aubert, 1966

Species of wasp

Diadegma dinianator is a wasp first described by Aubert in 1966. No subspecies are listed.
