= Diadegma californicum =

Scientific classification
- Domain: Eukaryota
- Kingdom: Animalia
- Phylum: Arthropoda
- Class: Insecta
- Order: Hymenoptera
- Family: Ichneumonidae
- Genus: Diadegma
- Species: D. californicum

Binomial name
- Diadegma californicum Walley, 1967

Species of wasp

Diadegma californicum is a wasp first described by G.S. Walley in 1967. No subspecies are listed.
