= Diadegma meliloti =

Scientific classification
- Domain: Eukaryota
- Kingdom: Animalia
- Phylum: Arthropoda
- Class: Insecta
- Order: Hymenoptera
- Family: Ichneumonidae
- Genus: Diadegma
- Species: D. meliloti

Binomial name
- Diadegma meliloti Horstmann, 1973

Species of insect

Diadegma meliloti is a wasp first described by Horstmann in 1973. It is a member of the genus Diadegma and family Ichneumonidae. No subspecies are listed.
