= Diadegma mollipla =

Scientific classification
- Domain: Eukaryota
- Kingdom: Animalia
- Phylum: Arthropoda
- Class: Insecta
- Order: Hymenoptera
- Family: Ichneumonidae
- Genus: Diadegma
- Species: D. mollipla

Binomial name
- Diadegma mollipla Holmgren, 1868

Species of wasp

Diadegma mollipla is a wasp which parasitises the larvae of the diamondback moth and the potato tuber moth. The species was first described by August Holmgren in 1868. Its range includes the Canary Islands, Britain and parts of Africa.

== See also ==
- Parasitoid wasp
