= Diadegma alpicola =

Scientific classification
- Domain: Eukaryota
- Kingdom: Animalia
- Phylum: Arthropoda
- Class: Insecta
- Order: Hymenoptera
- Family: Ichneumonidae
- Genus: Diadegma
- Species: D. alpicola

Binomial name
- Diadegma alpicola (Smits van Burgst, 1914)

Species of wasp

Diadegma alpicola is a wasp first described by Smits van Burgst in 1914. No subspecies are listed.
