= Diadegma annulicrus =

Scientific classification
- Domain: Eukaryota
- Kingdom: Animalia
- Phylum: Arthropoda
- Class: Insecta
- Order: Hymenoptera
- Family: Ichneumonidae
- Genus: Diadegma
- Species: D. annulicrus

Binomial name
- Diadegma annulicrus (Thomson, 1887)

Species of wasp

Diadegma annulicrus is a wasp first described by Carl Gustaf Thomson in 1887. No subspecies are listed.
