= Diadegma crassiseta =

Scientific classification
- Domain: Eukaryota
- Kingdom: Animalia
- Phylum: Arthropoda
- Class: Insecta
- Order: Hymenoptera
- Family: Ichneumonidae
- Genus: Diadegma
- Species: D. crassiseta

Binomial name
- Diadegma crassiseta (Thomson, 1887)

Species of wasp

Diadegma crassiseta is a wasp first described by C.G. Thomson in 1887. No subspecies are listed.
