= Diadegma angulator =

Scientific classification
- Domain: Eukaryota
- Kingdom: Animalia
- Phylum: Arthropoda
- Class: Insecta
- Order: Hymenoptera
- Family: Ichneumonidae
- Genus: Diadegma
- Species: D. angulator

Binomial name
- Diadegma angulator (Aubert, 1963)

Species of wasp

Diadegma angulator is a wasp first described by Aubert in 1963. No subspecies are listed.
