= Diadegma capense =

Scientific classification
- Domain: Eukaryota
- Kingdom: Animalia
- Phylum: Arthropoda
- Class: Insecta
- Order: Hymenoptera
- Family: Ichneumonidae
- Genus: Diadegma
- Species: D. capense

Binomial name
- Diadegma capense (Cameron, 1906)

Species of wasp

Diadegma capense is a wasp first described by P. Cameron in 1906. No subspecies are listed.
