= Diadegma auranticolor =

Scientific classification
- Domain: Eukaryota
- Kingdom: Animalia
- Phylum: Arthropoda
- Class: Insecta
- Order: Hymenoptera
- Family: Ichneumonidae
- Genus: Diadegma
- Species: D. auranticolor

Binomial name
- Diadegma auranticolor Aubert, 1979

Species of wasp

Diadegma auranticolor is a wasp first described by Aubert in 1979. No subspecies are listed.
