= Diadegma albertae =

Scientific classification
- Domain: Eukaryota
- Kingdom: Animalia
- Phylum: Arthropoda
- Class: Insecta
- Order: Hymenoptera
- Family: Ichneumonidae
- Genus: Diadegma
- Species: D. albertae

Binomial name
- Diadegma albertae (Walley, 1929)

Species of wasp

Diadegma albertae is a wasp first described by Walley in 1929. No subspecies are listed.
