= Diadegma claripenne =

Scientific classification
- Kingdom: Animalia
- Phylum: Arthropoda
- Class: Insecta
- Order: Hymenoptera
- Family: Ichneumonidae
- Genus: Diadegma
- Species: D. claripenne

Binomial name
- Diadegma claripenne (Thomson, 1887)

Species of wasp

Diadegma claripenne is a wasp first described by Carl Gustaf Thomson in 1887. No subspecies are listed.
