= Diadegma cinnabaritor =

Scientific classification
- Domain: Eukaryota
- Kingdom: Animalia
- Phylum: Arthropoda
- Class: Insecta
- Order: Hymenoptera
- Family: Ichneumonidae
- Genus: Diadegma
- Species: D. cinnabaritor

Binomial name
- Diadegma cinnabaritor Aubert, 1970

Species of wasp

Diadegma cinnabaritor is a wasp first described by Aubert in 1970. No subspecies are listed.
