= Diadegma antennaellae =

Scientific classification
- Domain: Eukaryota
- Kingdom: Animalia
- Phylum: Arthropoda
- Class: Insecta
- Order: Hymenoptera
- Family: Ichneumonidae
- Genus: Diadegma
- Species: D. antennaellae

Binomial name
- Diadegma antennaellae (Walley, 1932)

Species of wasp

Diadegma antennaellae is a wasp first described by Walley in 1932. No subspecies are listed.
