= Diadegma patruele =

Scientific classification
- Domain: Eukaryota
- Kingdom: Animalia
- Phylum: Arthropoda
- Class: Insecta
- Order: Hymenoptera
- Family: Ichneumonidae
- Genus: Diadegma
- Species: D. patruele

Binomial name
- Diadegma patruele Holmgren, 1868

Species of wasp

Diadegma patruele is a wasp first described by Holmgren in 1868. It is found in South Africa.

== See also ==
- Parasitoid wasp
