= Diadegma amphipoeae =

Scientific classification
- Domain: Eukaryota
- Kingdom: Animalia
- Phylum: Arthropoda
- Class: Insecta
- Order: Hymenoptera
- Family: Ichneumonidae
- Genus: Diadegma
- Species: D. amphipoeae

Binomial name
- Diadegma amphipoeae Kusigemati, 1993

Species of wasp

Diadegma amphipoeae is a wasp first described by Kusigemati in 1993. No subspecies are listed.
