= Diadegma defectivum =

Scientific classification
- Domain: Eukaryota
- Kingdom: Animalia
- Phylum: Arthropoda
- Class: Insecta
- Order: Hymenoptera
- Family: Ichneumonidae
- Genus: Diadegma
- Species: D. defectivum

Binomial name
- Diadegma defectivum (Kokujev, 1915)

Species of wasp

Diadegma defectivum is a wasp first described by Kokujev in 1915. No subspecies are listed.
