= Diadegma brevivalve =

Scientific classification
- Domain: Eukaryota
- Kingdom: Animalia
- Phylum: Arthropoda
- Class: Insecta
- Order: Hymenoptera
- Family: Ichneumonidae
- Genus: Diadegma
- Species: D. brevivalve

Binomial name
- Diadegma brevivalve (Thomson, 1887)

Synonyms
- Diadegma valachicum (Constantineanu, 1936)

Species of wasp

Diadegma brevivalve, also known as Diadegma valachicum, is a wasp first described by Thomson in 1887. No subspecies are listed.
