= Morley =

Morley may refer to:

== Places ==
=== England ===
- Morley, Norfolk, a civil parish
- Morley, Derbyshire, a civil parish
- Morley, Cheshire, a village
- Morley, County Durham, a village
- Morley, West Yorkshire, a suburban town of Leeds and civil parish
- Morley (UK Parliament constituency), a former constituency in the West Riding of Yorkshire
- Morley, a former wapentake of the West Riding of Yorkshire, later merged into Agbrigg and Morley
- Moreleigh, South Hams, Devon; formerly spelled as "Morley"

=== United States ===
- Morley, Colorado, a town
- Morley, Iowa, a city
- Morley, Michigan, a village
- Morley, Missouri, a city
- Morley, New York, a hamlet
- Morley, Tennessee, an unincorporated community

=== Elsewhere ===
- Morley, Western Australia, a suburb of Perth
- Electoral district of Morley, an electorate of the Western Australian Legislative Assembly
- Mînî Thnî (formerly Morley), Canada, a First Nations settlement
- Morley, Ontario, Canada, a township
- Morley, Meuse, a commune in the Meuse département, France
- Mount Morley, Alexander Island, Antarctica
- Morley Glacier, Victoria Land, Antarctica
- Morley (crater), on the Moon

== Schools ==
- Morley College, an adult education college in London
- Morley Senior High School, Noranda, Western Australia
- The Morley Academy, a co-educational secondary school in West Yorkshire, England

== Titles ==
- Earl of Morley, a title in the Peerage of the United Kingdom
- Baron Morley, an abeyant title in the Peerage of England

== People ==
- Morley (name), a list of people with the surname or given name
- Morley (artist) (born 1982), Los Angeles street artist
- Morley (singer), American singer-songwriter Morley Kamen

== Other uses ==
- Morley (1811 ship), a West Indiaman
- Morley R.F.C., a rugby union club in Morley, West Yorkshire
- Morley Drive, a major road in the suburbs of Perth, Western Australia
- Morley Library, Painesville, Ohio, United States
- Morley Fund Management, a UK-based asset management company
- Morley Pedals, a brand of guitar effects pedals
- Morley (also called Move), a life-like cellular automaton
- Morley (cigarette), a fictional brand of cigarettes seen in many films and television shows
- Morley, a title character in the Dave and Morley Stories featured on the CBC radio show The Vinyl Cafe
- Morley, a fictional kingdom from the video game Dishonored

== See also ==
- Morleys Stores, a group of seven department stores in Greater London and several other businesses
- Morleys Hall
- Maury (disambiguation)
