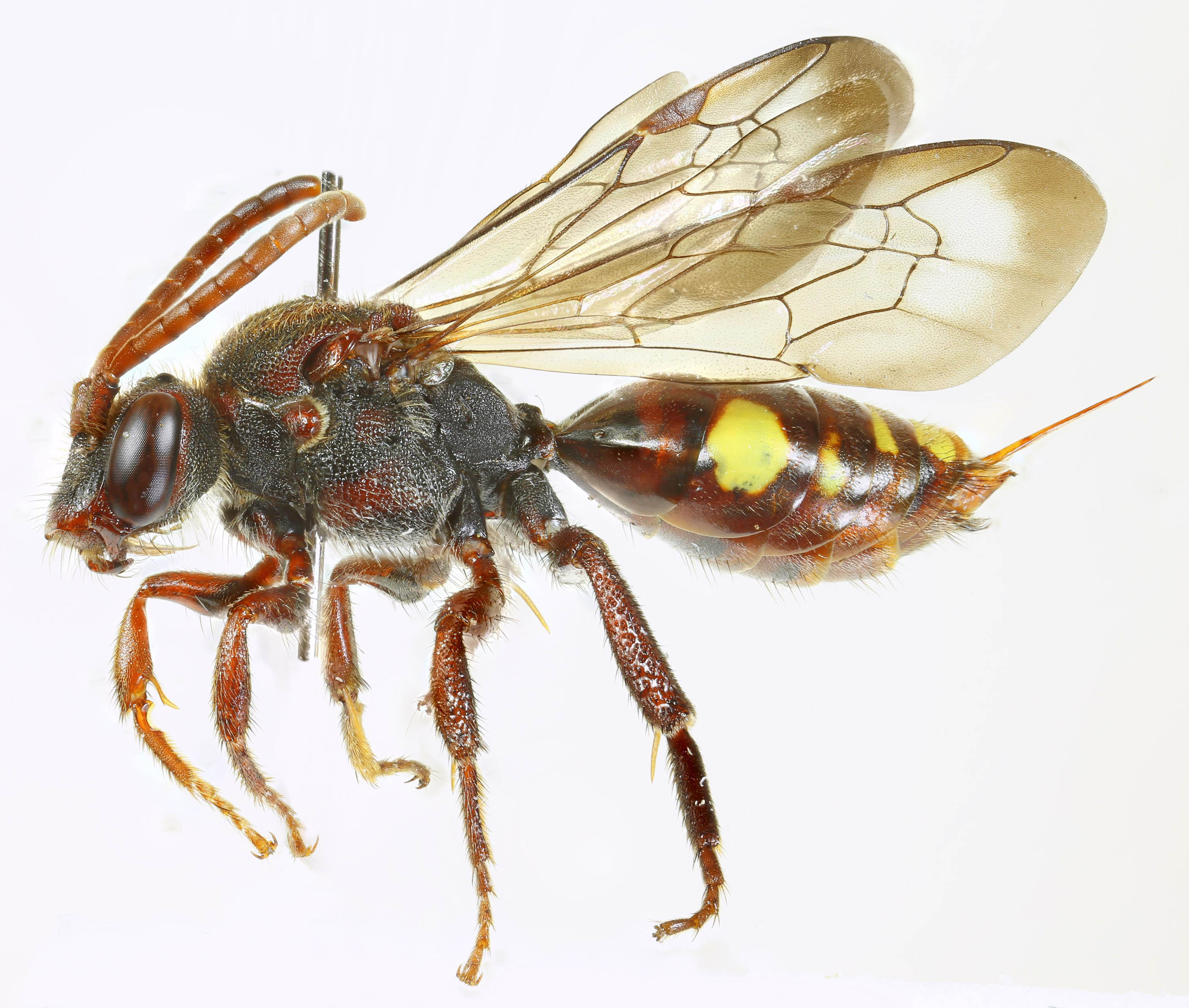
- Nomada panzeri female, Llandegla forest, North Wales

Scientific classification
- Kingdom: Animalia
- Phylum: Arthropoda
- Clade: Pancrustacea
- Class: Insecta
- Order: Hymenoptera
- Family: Apidae
- Subfamily: Nomadinae
- Tribe: Nomadini
- Genus: Nomada
- Species: N. panzeri

Binomial name
- Nomada panzeri Lepeletier, 1841

= Nomada panzeri =

Species of bee

Nomada panzeri is a Palearctic species of nomad bee.
