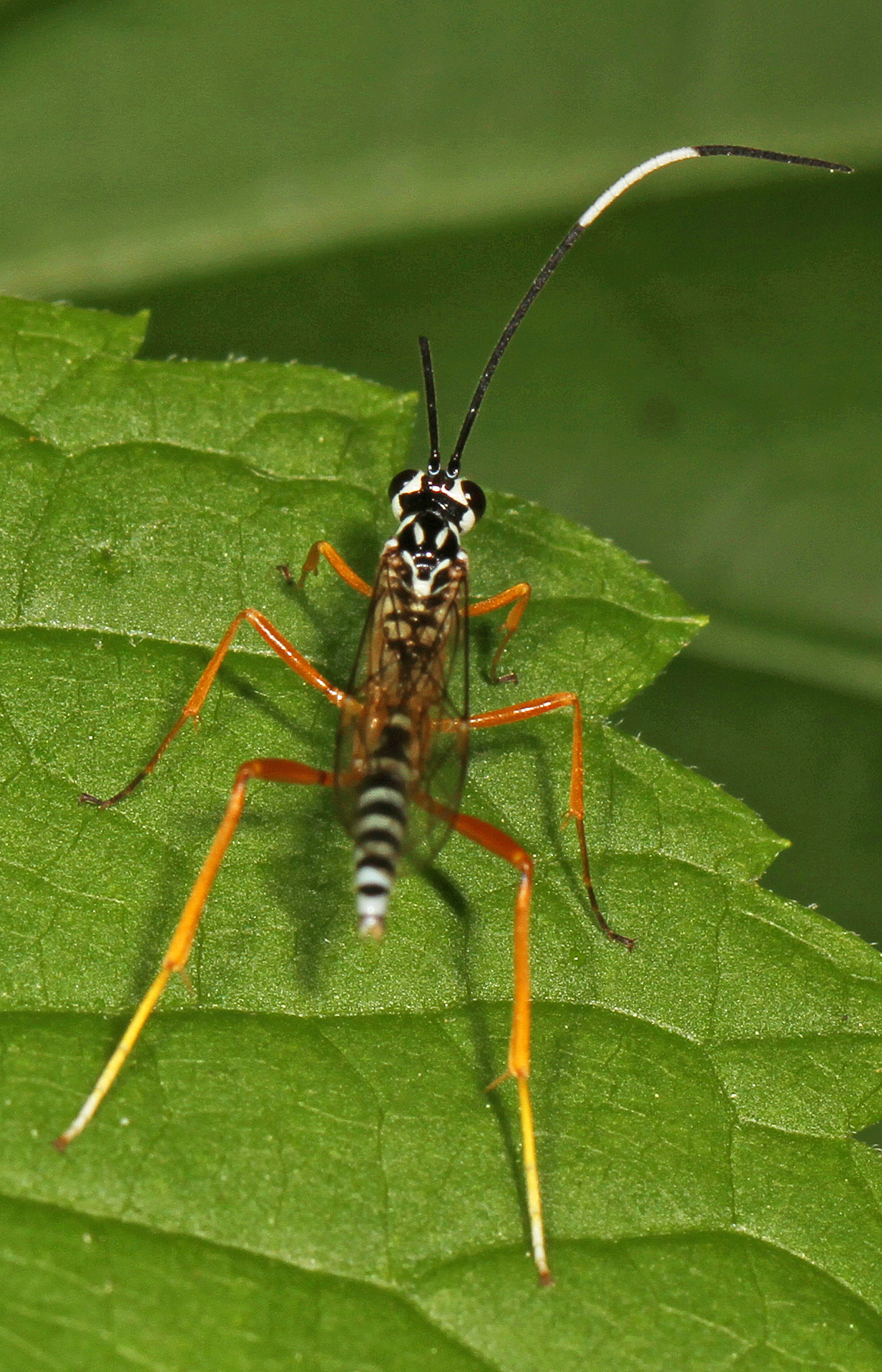
- Polycyrtus neglectus, male

Scientific classification
- Domain: Eukaryota
- Kingdom: Animalia
- Phylum: Arthropoda
- Class: Insecta
- Order: Hymenoptera
- Family: Ichneumonidae
- Subtribe: Mesostenina
- Genus: Polycyrtus; Spinola, 1840

Diversity
- at least 160 species

Synonyms
- Crytopterygimorpha Viereck, 1913; Cryptanuridimorpha Viereck, 1913; Polycyrtimorpha Viereck, 1913

= Polycyrtus =

Genus of wasps

Polycyrtus is a genus of ichneumon wasps in the subfamily Cryptinae. There are more than 160 species of Polycyrtus, found in the Americas.

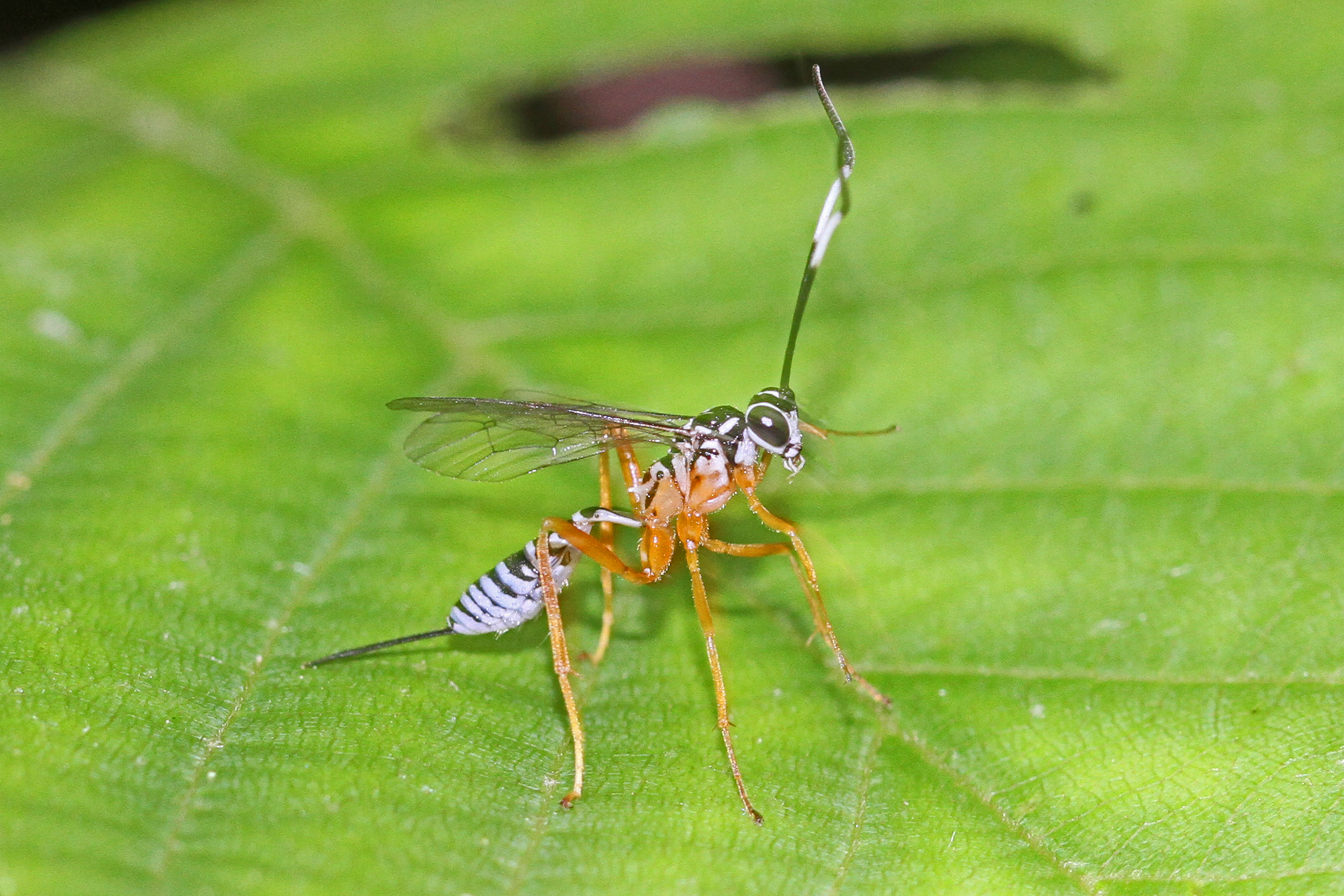
Polycyrtus neglectus, female

== See also ==
- List of Polycyrtus species
