= Tohru Uchida =

Japanese marine zoologist (1897–1981)

Tohru Uchida (内田亨, August 24, 1897 – October 27, 1981) was a Japanese zoologist who specialised in Cnidaria and who taught zoology and taxonomy at Hokkaido University, where in 1932 he became the first full time professor of systematic taxonomy in the Department of Zoology (1932-1961).

He received his Doctor of Science from Tokyo University in 1923, for work on Stauromedusae and Cubomedusae, which was followed with further study in Germany for two years, studying under Frisch in Munich and Goldschmidt in Berlin-Dahlem, in their laboratories.

He worked to establish systematic taxonomy of animals and also studied sex changes in amphibians. His areas of interest were broad, and in addition to his specialty of invertebrates he also published on birds and mammals.

He also wrote essays and other works, and in 1953 won the first Japan Essayist Club Award for "The Woodpecker's Path". In 1961, he became president of the Japanese Society of Systematic Zoology.

== Influence ==
Many famous Japanese zoologists grew up under his tutelage, including the mite specialists: Yasushi Asanuma, Taiji Imamura (water mites), and Shozo Ehara [ 6 ] .

== Awards, honors and recognition ==
- December 8, 1948: As a member of the Science Committee, he met the Emperor [ 14 ]
- March 28, 1951: Invited to the Imperial Palace to attend a joint lecture on biological taxonomy and roundtable discussion, and act as the moderator. [ 15 ]
- 1953: Received the Japan Essayist Club Award .
- 1961: President of the Society of Systematic Zoology.

== Publications ==
=== Books ===
- 日本動物分類 第3巻 第2編 腔腸動物門 鉢水母綱 Japanese Zoological Classification Volume 3 Part 2 Coelenterata Phylum Bacchus” (Sanseido 1936)
- 魚の感覚 "The Sense of Fish" (Sogensha (Fountain of Science), 1946)
- 相撲雑感 "Miscellaneous Thoughts on Sumo" (Tsuru Bunko (Pure Books), 1947)
- 犬 その歴史と心理 "Dogs: Their History and Psychology" Sogensha (Sogen Sensho, 1948)
- 蜜蜂と花時計 "Honeybees and Flower Clock" (Kitakata Publishing, 1948, later published by Obunsha Bunko)
- "The Temptation of Flowers: The Senses of Insects" (Kitaho Publishing (Science Monographs) 1949)
- "Woodpecker's Path Essays" Towasha, 1952)
- "Zoology" (Asahi Shimbun (Asahi New Lecture Series) 1953)
- "Biological Experimental Methods Course, Volume 4, D: Animal Taxonomy Research Methods" (Nakayama Shoten, 1955)
- "Children's Zoology" (Seibundo Shinkosha (Our Science Library) 1956)
- "The Trial of the Cat" (Dainippon Yubenkai Kodansha (Million Books) 1956)
- "The Ivory Hippopotamus: Essays" Dai-Nippon Yubenkai Kodansha Million Books 1956 "Wisdom Stories of Animals" Dainihon Tosho (Encyclopedia of Stories) 1957)
- "The Dog Book" Hosei University Press, 1957
- "The Avenue of Biology" (Uchida Rokakuho, 1957)
- "Fundamentals of Animal Systematic Classification" (Hokuryukan, 1965)
- From the Window of the Ivory Tower (Sekkeisha Publishing (Scientists' Essay Series), 1967)
- "Recollections of Sapporo" Puyara Shinsho Publishing Association 1968
- "100 Animal Stories" New Science Publishing 1971
- Mammals co-authored by Nagahisa Kuroda, Nakayama Shoten, Animal Systematics, Vol. 10. Vertebrates; 1963 Uchida, T; Okada, Y. (1960). Animal anatomy, histology, and development. 3 volumes. Co-edited by Okada Y. Nakayama Shoten. NCID BN02967665
- Yatsu-Uchida Animal Classification Dictionary (edited by Yatsu Naohide and Uchida, Nakayama Shoten, 1972)

=== translations ===
- Osborn, The Origin and Evolution of Life (co-translated with Yoshinobu Miyashita), Iwanami Shoten, 1931 .
- Julian Huxley, " The Ants " (co-translated with Toichi Koyama), Sogensha, 1940 .
- Karl von Frisch, The Wonder of Bees, Hosei University Press, 1953 .
- Karl von Frisch, The Wonders of Bees (revised edition), Hosei University Press, 1963 .
- Karl von Frisch, The Mysteries of Bees: Their Language and Senses, Hosei University Press (Cosmos Books), 1970 .
- Fabre, " The Insect Book: A Young Person's Guide to the Classics " (translated and edited by Uchida Yuichi), Shakai Shisosha, Modern Culture Library, 1972 .

== See also ==
- Taxa named by Tohru Uchida
