= R. A. Cushman =

American entomologist

Robert Asa Cushman (6 November 1880 – 25 March 1957) was an American entomologist who worked mainly on agricultural entomology at the Bureau of Entomology in Washington DC. He also worked on the systematics of ichneumonid and chalcidoid wasps.

Cushman was born in Taunton, Massachusetts and was trained at the University of New Hampshire and Cornell University. He worked in the US Department of Agriculture from 1906 working on aspects of economic entomology. He worked on the cotton boll weevil and then studied fruit insects at Vienna, VA. From 1920 he worked full-time at the National Museum. He was a member of the Entomological Society of Washington from 1911 and became its secretary in 1919, serving as a vice president in 1923 and 1924 and as its president in 1925. He published more than 113 articles through his career. He retired from service in 1944 due to poor health and moved along with his wife to live in Altadena, California. He died in 1957.
