= Johann Ludwig Christian Gravenhorst =

German entomologist, herpetologist and zoologist

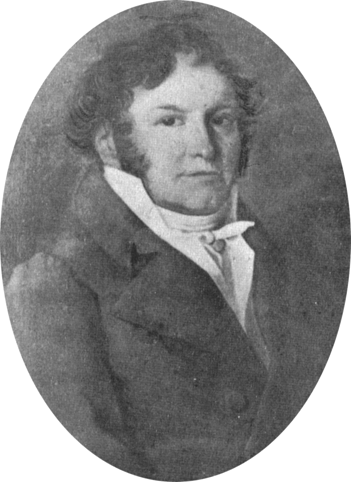
Johann Ludwig Christian Gravenhorst.

Johann Ludwig Christian Carl Gravenhorst (14 November 1777 – 14 January 1857), sometimes Jean Louis Charles or Carl, was a German entomologist, herpetologist, and zoologist.

== Life ==
Gravenhorst was born in Braunschweig. His early interest in insects was encouraged by two of his professors, both amateur entomologists. He entered the University of Helmstedt to study law in 1797. However, the death of his father two years later left him a great fortune; so he was able to change his direction. He enrolled at the University of Göttingen where he followed the courses of Johann Friedrich Blumenbach. He returned to present his thesis to Helmstädt on a subject of entomology. He went to Paris in 1802 and there met Georges Cuvier, Pierre André Latreille, and Alexandre Brongniart. Parallel to his studies, he assembled, thanks to his financial means, a very important natural history collection. In 1805, he obtained a professorial chair in Göttingen and published the following year Monographie Coleopterorum.

Among his work, Gravenhorst's studies of the parasitic wasps is especially important, but he also worked in herpetology. He settled in Frankfurt (Oder) in 1810, teaching natural history at the university of the city. The following year, the university was transferred to Breslau. There he became director of the Breslau Natural History Museum and installed his own collections there. He started to suffer from mental disorders after 1825, stopping all scientific work in the year 1840, and withdrawing completely into himself in 1856. He died in Breslau.

== Achievements ==
Gravenhorst was a specialist in Staphylinidae and Ichneumonidae describing many new species. He was also one of the first frog specialists.

Two species of lizards are named in his honor: Liolaemus gravenhorstii and Trachylepis gravenhorstii.

Gravenhorst appears to be also responsible for naming Arthropoda in 1843, which had previous been erroneously attributed to other authors.

== Species described by Gravenhorst ==
- Ambystoma opacum, the marbled salamander of the eastern United States
- Rana cancrivora, now Fejervarya cancrivora, the crab-eating frog of Malaysia and Thailand
- Leiocephalus schreibersii, the red-sided curly-tailed lizard of the West Indies
- Fowlea melanzosta, the Andaman keelback snake

== Works ==
- Monographia Coleopterorum Micropterorum. Göttingen: Henricus Dieterich, xvi+248 pp, tabula. (1802)

Click for PDF:

- Coleoptera Microptera Brunsvicensia nec non exoticorum quotquot exstant in collectionibus entomologorum Brunsvicensium in genera familias et species distribuit. Braunschweig: Carolus Reichard, lxvi+207 pp. Gravenhorst, J.L.C (1806)

Click for PDF:

- Ichneumologia Europaea. Vratislaviae, sumtibus auctoris. 3 volumes (including supplement). pp. xxxi, 827, (4); 989; 1097, with 2 engraved plates and 2 folded tables.(1829) – Contents I: Generalia, Ichneumones, Supplementa, Indices – II: Tryphones, Trogos, Alomyas, Cryptos – III: Pimplas, Metopios, Bassos, Banchos, Ophiones, Hellwigias, Acaenitas, Xoridas, Supplementa. BHL digitised text of all 3 volumes.

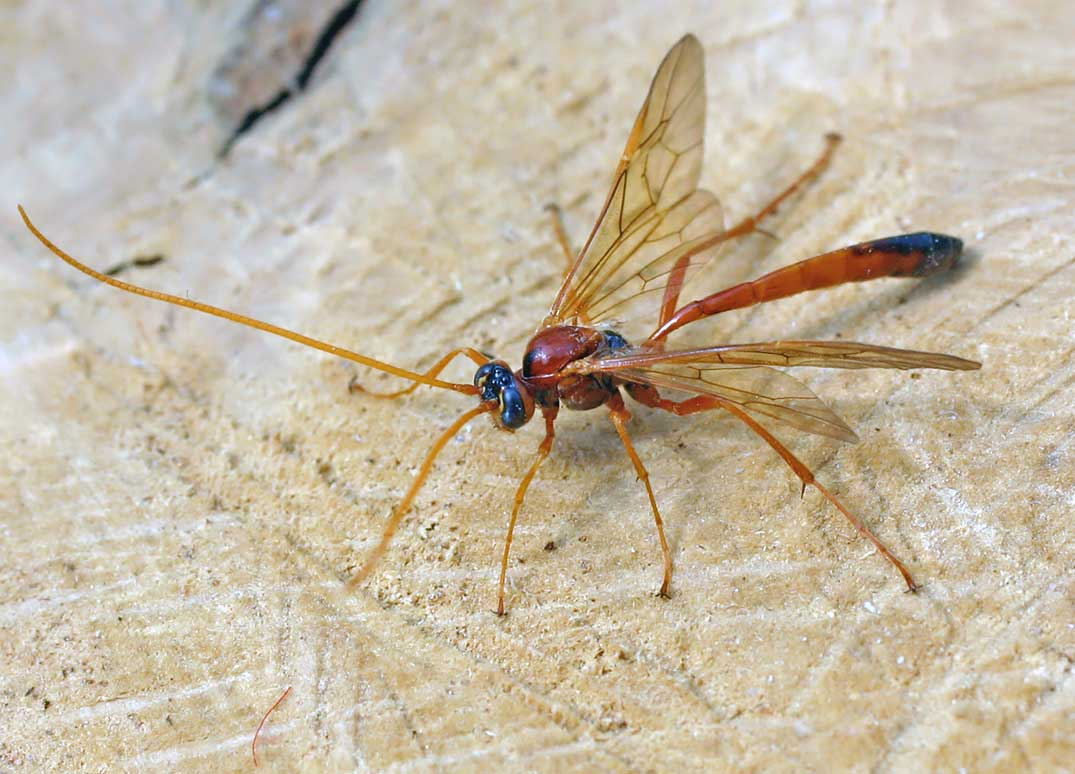
Ophion ventricosus an ichneumon described by Gravenhorst.

== Collections ==
- Museum of Natural History at University of Wrocław
- Armenology Research National Center
