= Carl Gustav Alexander Brischke =

German entomologist (1814–1897)

Carl Gustav Alexander Brischke (December 17, 1814 – 1897) was a German entomologist who worked on Diptera and Hymenoptera, mainly the Ichneumonidae and Braconidae.

Briscke was from Danzig, West Prussia.

He was the author of Die Hymenopteren des Bernsteins; Schriften der Naturforschenden Gesellschaft in Danzig, (N.F.), 6(3), 278-279 (1886), and of the four part Die Ichneumoniden der Provinzen West- und Ost-Preussen (Band 1, 1878; Band 2, 1879; Band 3, 1880; Band 4, 1881).

His collections are located in the Staatliches Museum für Naturkunde, Gdańsk, Poland; Zoologisches Museum Königsberg, Russia and in the Zoological museum in the State University of Kharkiv, Ukraine.
