= Henry Lorenz Viereck =

American entomologist

Henry Lorenz Viereck (28 March 1881 – 8 October 1931) was an American entomologist who specialised in Hymenoptera. He wrote Guide to the insects of Connecticut. Pt. III. The Hymenoptera, or wasp-like insects of Connecticut. State Geological and Natural History Survey of Connecticut, No. 22: 1-824 and many other works.

== See also ==
- Category:Taxa named by Henry Lorenz Viereck
