= Mori =

Mori is a Japanese and Italian surname. It is also the name of two clans in Japan, and one clan in India.

== Italian surname ==
- Camilo Mori, Chilean painter
- Cesare Mori, Italian "Iron Prefect"
- Claudia Mori, Italian actress, singer, television producer
- Damian Mori, Italian-Australian football player
- Daniele Mori (born 1990) Italian footballer
- Fabrizio Mori, Italian hurdler
- Federico Mori, Italian rugby union player
- Francesco Mori, Italian painter
- Lara Mori, Italian artistic gymnast
- Manuele Mori, Italian professional road bicycle racer
- Massimiliano Mori, Italian former professional road bicycle racer
- Michael Mori, aka "Dan Mori", U.S. military lawyer
- Miguel Mori, Argentine footballer
- Nicolas Mori, Italian-English violinist
- Paola Mori, Italian actress and aristocrat
- Primo Mori, Italian professional road bicycle racer.
- Ramiro Funes Mori and Rogelio Funes Mori, twin brothers and Argentine footballers
- Scott Alan Mori (1941–2020), American botanist
- Simone Mori (cyclist), Italian former professional racing cyclist
- Uberto Mori, Italian religious figure

== Japanese surname ==
Mori (written: 森 lit. "forest", [moɾi]) is the 24th most common Japanese surname. Mōri (written: 毛利, [moːɾi]) is a separate surname that may be transliterated the same way.

- Ai Mori (森 秋彩; born 2003), professional rock climber
- Akihiko Mori (森 彰彦; 1966–1998), composer
- Akio Mori (森 昭雄; born 1947), physiologist and writer
- Akira Mori (森 章; born 1936), son of Taikichiro Mori (森 泰吉郎), CEO of Mori Trust
- Mori Arinori (森 有礼; 1847–1889), statesman/diplomat
- Bárbara Mori (born 1978), Uruguayan-born Mexican actress, model, producer and writer
- Mori Calliope (森 カリオペ), livestreamer, rapper, and singer
- Mori Chack (森 チャック; born 1973), graphics designer
- Chiharu Mori (森 千春; born 1962), swimmer
- Chinatsu Mori (森 千夏; 1980–2006), shotputter
- Daisuke Mori (守 大助; born 1971), nurse and serial killer
- Eijiro Mori (森 英次郎; born 1986), footballer
- Eisuke Mori (森 英介; born 1948), politician
- Futoshi Mori (森 太志; born 1988), rugby player
- Hanae Mori (森 英恵; 1926–2022), fashion designer
- Hideki Mori (森 秀樹; born 1961), manga artist
- Mōri Hidemoto (毛利 秀元; 1579–1650), retainer of the Toyotomi clan throughout the latter Sengoku Period
- Hiromichi Mori (森 博達; born 1949), linguist
- Hiroshi Mori (disambiguation), multiple people
- Ikue Mori (森 郁恵; born 1953), musician
- Johnny Mori (born 1949), Japanese-American musician and arts educator/administrator
- Junko Mori (森 純子; born 1974), metalwork sculptor
- Kanna Mori (森 カンナ; born 1988), actress
- Kaori Mori (森 かおり; born 1979), badminton player
- Kaoru Mori (森 薫; born 1978), manga artist
- Katsuhiro Mori (森 勝洋; born 1983), champion 'Magic: The Gathering' player
- Katsuji Mori (森 功至; born 1945), voice actor
- Kazutoshi Mori (森 和俊; born 1958), molecular biologist
- Kenzo Mori (森 研三; 1914–2007), Japanese-Canadian journalist
- Mori Koben (森 小弁; 1869–1945), adventurer and businessman
- Mōri Koyuki (毛利 小雪; born 2002) better known as Yuki (Korean : 유키), member & rapper of South Korean idol girl group Purple Kiss under Rainbow Bridge World
- Kyoichi Mori (森 恭一), Japanese whale-watcher
- Larry Mori (1948–2022), American bridge player
- Manny Mori (born 1949), former President of the Federated States of Micronesia (great-grandson of Mori Koben (森 小弁)
- Mari Mori (森 茉莉; 1903–1987), novelist, daughter of Ōgai Mori (森 林太郎)
- Maria Mori (born 1956), Japanese-American actress
- Mariko Mori (森 万里子; born 1967), artist
- Masaaki Mori (森 正明; born 1961), former footballer
- Masaaki Mori (baseball) (森 祇晶; born 1937)
- Masahiro Mori (disambiguation), multiple people
- Masako Mori (disambiguation), multiple people
- Masayuki Mori (disambiguation), multiple people
- Minori Mori (森 美乃里; born 1957), Japanese javelin thrower
- Minoru Mori (森 稔; 1934–2012), son of Taikichiro Mori (森 泰吉郎), building tycoon and namesake for Roppongi Hills Mori Tower
- Mitsugu Mori (森 貢; 1908–1969), fighter ace
- Mitsuko Mori (森 光子; 1920–2012), actress
- Momoe Mori (森 萌々穂; born 2004), Japanese entertainer
- Mōri Motonari (毛利 元就; 1497–1571), daimyō of the Mōri clan
- Mucha Mori (森 ムチャ; born 1988), basketball player
- Mori Naganao (森 長直; 1672–1722), daimyō
- Nana Mori (森 七菜; born 2001), actress
- Naoki Mori (disambiguation), multiple people
- Naoko Mori (森 尚子; born 1971), actress
- Nobuteru Mori (森 矗昶; 1884–1941), businessman
- Mori Ōgai (森 鷗外; 1862–1922), novelist and physician
- Reiko Mori (森禮子; 1928–2014), Japanese novelist
- Riyo Mori (森 理世; born 1986), Miss Universe 2007
- S. Floyd Mori (born 1939), American educator and politician
- Sakura Mori (森 さくら; born 1996), Japanese table tennis player
- Satoshi Mori (disambiguation), multiple people
- Shigeaki Mori (森 重昭; 1937–2026), historian
- Shigefumi Mori (森 重文; born 1951), mathematician
- Shigekazu Mori (森 繁和; born 1954), baseball player
- Shigeki Mori (森 茂喜; 1910–1989), mayor of Neagari, father of Yoshirō Mori (森 喜朗)
- Shinichi Mori (森 進一; born 1947), enka singer
- Shinji Mori (森 慎二; 1974–2017), baseball player
- Shunya Mori (毛利 駿也; born 1995), Japanese footballer
- Mori Sōiken (森 宗意軒; died 1638), co-leader of the 17th-century Shimabara Rebellion
- Mori Sosen (森 狙仙; 1747–1821), Japanese painter
- Mori Sumio (森 澄雄; 1919–2010), Japanese poet
- Taikichiro Mori (森 泰吉郎; 1904-1993), founder of Mori Building Company
- Mōri Takachika (毛利 敬親; 1819–1871), daimyō
- Takaji Mori (森 孝慈; 1943–2011), footballer
- Mōri Takamoto (毛利 隆元; 1523–1563), daimyō, son of Mōri Motonari (毛利 元就)
- Takayuki Mori (森 隆行; born 1976), wrestler
- Takeshi Mori (disambiguation), multiple people
- Tamezo Mori (森 為三; 1884–1962), naturalist
- Tatsuya Mori (森 達也; born 1956), film director
- Mōri Terumoto (毛利 輝元), daimyō, grandson of Mōri Motonari (毛利 元就)
- Tomoya Mori (森 友哉; born 1995), Japanese baseball player
- Toshia Mori, actress
- Toshio Mori, American author
- Toshiko Mori (森 俊子; born 1951), architect
- Tsuneo Mori (森 恒夫; 1944–1973), radical leftist
- Ushinosuke Mori (森 丑之助; 1877–1926), anthropologist
- Wataru Mori (森 渉; born 1983), actor
- Yasuji Mori (森 康二; 1925–1992), animator
- Yoko Mori (森 瑤子; 1940–1993), novelist
- Yoshirō Mori (森 喜朗; born 1937), former Prime Minister of Japan
- Yoshiro Mori (mathematician)
- Yoshitoshi Mori (森 義利; 1898–1992), artist
- Mori Yoshinari (森 可成; 1523–1570), 16th-century samurai
  - Mori Nagayoshi (森 長可; 1558–1584), son of Mori Yoshinari
  - Mori Ranmaru (森 蘭丸; 1565–1582), son of Mori Yoshinari
- Yuito Mori (森 唯斗; born 1992), baseball player
- Yukinojo Mori (森 雪之丞; born 1954), singer
- Yuko Mori (森 裕子; born 1956), politician
- Yusuke Mori (森 勇介; born 1980), footballer
- Yuto Mori (森 勇人; born 1995), footballer

== Aramaic title of honor ==
- Mori, a word used extensively by Yemenite Jews designating a "rabbi", taken from the Judeo-Aramaic word, מר (mor), meaning "master" or "lord". Mori, literally meaning, "my master," or "my lord".

== Other people named Mori ==
- Amirkhan Mori, Russian businessman
- Dan Mori (born 1988 as Dean (Din) Mori), Israeli footballer
- Raam Mori, Gujarati author
- Lucija Mori, Slovenian footballer
- Chitrangada Mori, Indian aristocrat
- Mark de Mori, Australian boxer
- Mori Eskandani, American poker player
- Mori Arkin, Israeli businessman
- Hiroko Mori (born 1937), Micronesian politician

== Fictional characters ==
- Ai Mori in The Law of Ueki
- Mori Green, a minor character in Grand Theft Auto IV
- Mori Kibbutz, the brother of Brucie in Grand Theft Auto IV
- Kogoro Mouri, character in Detective Conan
- Mako Mori, character in the film Pacific Rim
- Ran Mouri, character in Detective Conan
- Shin Mōri, character in Yoroiden Samurai Troopers
- Takashi "Mori" Morinozuka, character in Ouran High School Host Club
- Yorick Mori, character in the online multiplayer game League of Legends
- Mario Mori, character in Doubutsu Sentai Zyuohger
- Mori Jin, the main character of The God of Highschool
- Mori, character in the online gacha game Goddess of Victory: Nikke

== See also ==
- Kingdom of Mori, a small historical polity in modern-day Indonesia
- Mori Point, a park in Pacifica, California named after Italian immigrant Stefano Mori
- Mohri (disambiguation), a Japanese surname
- Moori (disambiguation)
- Māori, the indigenous people of New Zealand
