= Muri =

Muri may refer to:

== Places ==
=== Colombia ===
- Río Murri, a tributary of the Atrato River

=== Estonia ===
- Muri, Viljandi County, village in Karksi Parish, Viljandi County
- Muri, Tartu County, village in Luunja Parish, Tartu County

=== India ===
- Muri, Ranchi, a town in Jharkhand
  - Muri Junction railway station

=== Iran ===
- Muri, Khuzestan, a village in Khuzestan Province
- Muri-ye Ajam, a village in Kohgiluyeh and Boyer-Ahmad Province
- Muri, Razavi Khorasan, a village in Razavi Khorasan Province

=== Japan ===
- Muri Dam, on the island of Hokkaido

=== New Zealand ===
- Muri railway station, a former railway station in Pukerua Bay
- Muri Beach, a beach by the lagoon on Rarotonga in the Cook Islands

=== Nigeria ===
- Muri, Nigeria, a town and emirate in Taraba State
- The Muri Mountains, a mountain range in Northern Nigeria

=== Switzerland ===
- Muri, Aargau, a municipality in the canton of Aargau
- Muri District, a district of the canton of Aargau
  - Muri Abbey, a Benedictine monastery
- Muri bei Bern, a municipality in the canton of Bern

== People with the name ==
- Muri (singer), real name Murad Mahmoud, part of the Danish pop duo Muri & Mario
- Muri (musician), Filipino member of the band Ransom Collective
- Apia Muri, Papua New Guinean basketball player
- André Muri (born 1981), Norwegian footballer
- Bjørn Johan Muri (born 1990), Norwegian singer
- Dick Muri (born 1953), U.S. politician
- Enikő Muri (born 1990), Hungarian actress and singer
- James Muri (1918–2013), American World War II pilot
- Linda Muri (born 1963), American rower

== Other uses ==
- Muri (Japanese term), a word for overburden used in the Toyota Production System
- Muri (food), puffed rice in South Asian cuisine
- Muri or Moori, a Dragon Ball character
- MURI (grant), Multidisciplinary University Research Initiative
- Muri language, an alternative name for two unrelated Papuan languages:
  - Mer language, spoken in the Bird's Neck, Indonesian Papua
  - Guhu-Samane language, spoken in the Bird's Tail Peninsula, Papua New Guinea
- Muri Express, an Indian express train
- University of Muri, a fictional university

== See also ==
- Mury (disambiguation)
- Murri (disambiguation)
- Murie (disambiguation)
- Murry (disambiguation)
