= Maury (given name) =

Maury or Maurey is a given name, often a short form (hypocorism) of Maurice. Notable people with the name include:

- Maury Allen (1932–2010), American sportswriter
- Maury Bray (1909–1966), American football player
- Maury Buford (born 1960), retired National Football League punter
- Maury Chaykin (1949–2010), Canadian-American actor
- Maury M. Cohen, American filmmaker
- Maury Deutsch (1918–2007), American musician, arranger-composer and teacher
- Maury Laws (1923–2019), American television and film score composer
- Maury Maverick (1895–1954), American politician and coiner of the term "gobbledygook"
- Maury Nipp (born 1930), American football player
- Maury Povich (born 1939), American journalist and talk show host
- Maury Tigner (born 1937), American physicist
- Maury Waugh (born 1940), American football coach
- Maury Wills (1932–2022), Major League Baseball player

== See also ==
- Maurie, a given name
- Morrie, a given name
- Morey (disambiguation), includes list of people with surname Morey
- Morrey, surname
- Murry (disambiguation), includes list of people with given name and surname Murry
- Maury (disambiguation)
- Maury (surname)
