= Maury (surname) =

Maury is a surname. Notable people with the surname include:

- Abram Poindexter Maury (1801–1848), American politician and lawyer
- Alain Maury (born 1958), French astronomer
- Andrew Maury, American mixing engineer and record producer
- Antonia Maury (1866–1952), American astronomer, sister of Carlotta Maury
- Bernard Maurey (born 1948), French mathematician
- Carlotta Maury (1874–1938), American geologist and paleontologist, sister of Antonia Maury
- Cornelia F. Maury (1866–1942), American painter
- Dabney H. Maury (1822–1900), Confederate major general and United States Ambassador to Colombia
- Hervé Maurey (born 1961), French politician
- James Maury (1717–1769), American educator and cleric, father of James Maury (1746–1840) and grandfather of Matthew Fontaine Maury
- James Maury (consul) (1746–1840), one of the first diplomats of the United States
- Jean-Sifrein Maury (1746–1817), French cardinal and Archbishop of Paris
- John Walker Maury (1809–1855), lawyer and 14th mayor of Washington, D.C.
- Louis Ferdinand Alfred Maury (1817–1892), French scholar
- Matthew Fontaine Maury (1806–1873), American naval officer, oceanographer, cartographer and author
- Max Maurey (1866–1947), French playwright
- Nicole Maurey (1925–2016), French actress
- Pierre Maury (1282 or 1283–after 1324), French shepherd converted from Catholicism to Albigensianism
- Richard Maury (1882–1950), American engineer best known for his railroad work in Argentina
- Robert Maury (born 1958), American serial killer
- Serge Maury (born 1946), French sailor and 1972 Olympic champion in the Finn class
- Sarah Mytton Maury (1801–1849), English author, grandmother of Carlotta and Antonia Maury
- William Arden Maury (1832–1918), U.S. Assistant Attorney General, son of John Walker Maury
- William Lewis Maury (1813–1878), American naval officer
- Rafael Santos Borré Maury (born 1995), professional footballer

== See also ==
- Mauri (surname)
- Maury (given name)
- Maury_(disambiguation)
