= Mauri (disambiguation) =

Mauri were the people of the ancient north African kingdom Mauretania

Mauri may also refer to:

- Moors, North African people known in Latin as Mauri
- Mauri (life force), a concept in traditional Māori religion
- Mauri, Estonia, village in Misso Parish, Võru County
- Mauri River, in Bolivia and Peru
- AB Mauri, a division of Associated British Foods
- Mauri (film), 1987 New Zealand film directed by Merata Mita
- Mauri (fish), a Trichomycterus catfish found in Poopó Lake, Bolivia
- "hello" in the language of the i-Kiribati

== Name ==
- Mauri (surname), persons surnamed Mauri

=== Given name ===
- Mauri (1934–2022), Mauri Ugartemendia, Spanish footballer
- Mauri (born 1994), Mauri Franco Barbosa da Silva, Brazilian footballer
- Mauri Favén (1920–2006), Finnish painter
- Mauri Fonseca (born 1941), Brazilian Olympic swimmer
- Mauri Holappa (born 1965), Finnish footballer and coach
- Mauri König, Brazilian journalist
- Mauri Kunnas (born 1950), Finnish cartoonist and author
- Mauri Nyberg-Noroma (1908–1939), Finnish gymnast
- Mauri Pekkarinen (born 1947), Finnish politician
- Mauri Repo (1945–2002), Finnish athletic administrator
- Mauri Röppänen (born 1946), Finnish Olympia biathlete
- Mauri Rose (1906–1981), American racecar driver
- Mauri Ryömä (1911–1958), Finnish physician and politician
- Mauri Seppä (1916–2000), Finnish agronomist, farmer, and politician
- Mauri Valtonen, Finnish astronomer
- Mauri Wasi (born 1982), Papua New Guinean footballer

== See also ==
- , includes persons with Mauri as given name
- Maury (disambiguation)
- Maurya Empire
