= Morrie =

Morrie is a masculine given name, often a diminutive form (hypocorism) of Morris or Maurice. It may refer to:

== People ==
- Morrie (musician), Japanese singer-songwriter Motoyuki Ōtsuka (born 1964)
- Morrie Aderholt (1915-1955), American Major League Baseball player
- Morrie Arnovich (1910–1959), American Major League Baseball player
- Morrie Boyle (1910–2002), Australian rugby league player
- Morrie Brickman (1917-1994), American cartoonist, creator of the syndicated comic strip The Small Society
- Morrie Church (1922-1981), New Zealand rugby league coach
- Morrie Elis (1907-1992), American bridge player
- Morrie Ewans (1894–1971), Australian rules footballer
- Morrie Goddard (1921-1974), New Zealand rugby union player
- Morrie Lanning (born 1944), American politician
- Morrie Martin (1922-2010), American Major League Baseball pitcher
- Morrie McHugh (1917-2010), New Zealand rugby union player
- Morrie Rath (1886–1945), American Major League Baseball player
- Morrie or Maurie Robertson (1925-2000), New Zealand rugby league player, captain and coach
- Morrie Ryskind (1895–1985), American dramatist, lyricist, writer and conservative political activist
- Morrie Schwartz (1916–1995), American sociology professor, and author
- Morris Thompson (1939–2000), Alaska Native leader, businessman and political appointee
- Morrie Turner (1923-2014), American cartoonist, creator of the syndicated comic strip Wee Pals
- Morrie Wood (1876-1956), New Zealand rugby union player
- Morrie Yohai (1920-2010), American food company executive, creator of the snack Cheez Doodles

== Fictional characters ==
- Morris "Morrie" Bench, aka Hydro-Man, a Marvel Comics villain
- Morrie, a character in the video game, Dragon Quest VIII

== See also ==
- the title heroine of the Scottish ballad "Eppie Morrie"
- Morrie's law, in mathematics
- Maurie, another given name
- Maury (disambiguation)
- Morey (disambiguation), includes list of people with surname Morey
- Mori (disambiguation)
- Morrey, surname
