= Mory =

Mory may refer to:

== Places ==
=== France ===
- Mory, Pas-de-Calais in the Pas-de-Calais département
- Mory-Montcrux in the Oise département
- Mitry-Mory in the Seine-et-Marne département

=== Poland ===
- Mory, Pułtusk County, a village
- Mory, Warsaw West County, a village

== People ==
=== Given name ===
- Mory Bamba (born 2002), Ivorian footballer
- Mory Bamba (American football) (born 2000), American football player
- Mory Correa (born 1979), French basketball player
- Mory Diaw (born 1993), Senegalese footballer
- Mory Gbane (born 2000), Ivorian footballer
- Mory Kanté (1950–2020), Guinean vocalist and kora harpist
- Mory-Fallo Keïta (born 1992), Guinean footballer
- Mory Konaté (born 1993), Guinean footballer
- Mory Koné (born 1994), French footballer
- Mory Kromah (born 1999), Guinean-Dutch kickboxer
- Mory Sacko, French chef
- Mory Sidibé (born 1987), French volleyball player
- Mory Sinkoun Kaba (1933–2015), Guinean businessman and philanthropist

=== Surname ===
- Carmen Mory (1906–1947), Swiss Nazi German spy and kapo
- Eric Mory (born 1879), Swiss footballer
- Félix Mory (born 1995), French golfer
- Ján Móry (1892–1978), Slovak composer and pedagogue
- Philippe Mory (1935–2016), Gabonese actor and director

== Other uses ==
- Mory's, private club in Connecticut, United States, affiliated with Yale University

== See also ==
- Maury (disambiguation)
- Mohri (disambiguation)
- Moori (disambiguation)
- Moree (disambiguation)
- Morey (disambiguation)
- Mori, Japanese and Italian surname
  - Mori (disambiguation)
- Morley (disambiguation)
- Mouri (disambiguation)
