= Moree =

Moree may refer to:

- Moree, New South Wales, a town in New South Wales, Australia
- Moree, Ghana, a village in Akanland, Ghana
- Moree Plains Shire, a local government area in New South Wales, Australia
- Moree Airport, the airport for Moree, New South Wales, Australia

== See also ==
- Mohri (disambiguation)
- Moori (disambiguation)
- Mori, Japanese and Italian surname
  - Mori (disambiguation)
- Mory (disambiguation)
- Mouri (disambiguation)
