= Mori (disambiguation) =

Mori is a surname and a given name.

Mori may also refer to:

== Groups ==
- Mōri clan, a family of daimyō from Aki Province in Japan
- Mori (Genji clan), descendants of Genji in Japan
- Mori Kingdom, India
- MORI, a research organisation based in the United Kingdom

== Places ==
- Mori, Andhra Pradesh, a village in East Godavari district, Andhra Pradesh, India
- Mori, Uttar Pradesh, a village in Agra district, Uttar Pradesh, India
- Mori, Uttarakhand, a village in Uttarkashi district, Uttarakhand, India
- Mori, Trentino, Italy
- Mori, Shizuoka, a town in Shizuoka Prefecture, Japan
- Mori, Hokkaidō, a town in Hokkaidō, Japan
- Mori Kazakh Autonomous County, county in Xinjiang, China

== Other uses ==
- Mori (Busan restaurant), a restaurant in South Korea
- Mori (New York restaurant), a defunct restaurant in the United States
- mori (interjection)

== See also ==
- Memento mori, artistic creations to remind people of their own mortality, Latin for "Remember to die"
- Vincere aut mori, Wilhelm Sebastian von Belling's slogan, Latin for "Victory or death"
- Mohri (disambiguation)
- Moori (disambiguation)
- Moree (disambiguation)
- Morrie, given name
- Mory (disambiguation)
- Mouri (disambiguation), another romanization of Mōri
- Moriya (disambiguation)
- Māori, the indigenous people of New Zealand
- Quattro Mori: Flag of Sardinia
