= Moorey =

Moorey is a surname. Notable people with the surname include:

- Roger Moorey (1937–2004), British archaeologist

== See also ==
- Moray, a council area in Scotland
  - Moray (disambiguation)
- Morey (disambiguation)
- Morrey, a surname
