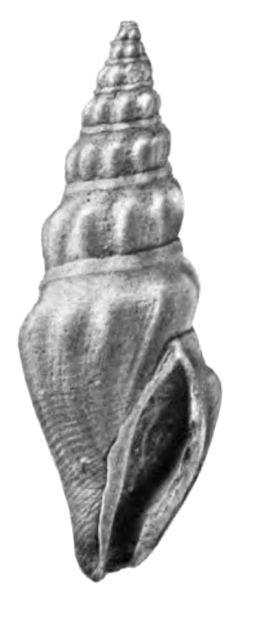
- Image of a shell of † Crassispira meunieri

Scientific classification
- Kingdom: Animalia
- Phylum: Mollusca
- Class: Gastropoda
- Subclass: Caenogastropoda
- Order: Neogastropoda
- Superfamily: Conoidea
- Family: Pseudomelatomidae
- Genus: Crassispira
- Species: C. meunieri

Binomial name
- Crassispira meunieri (Maury, 1910)

Synonyms
- † Drillia meunieri Maury, 1910

= Crassispira meunieri =

Extinct species of gastropod

Crassispira meunieri is an extinct species of sea snail, a marine gastropod mollusk in the family Pseudomelatomidae, the turrids and allies.

== Description ==
The length of the shell attains 41 mm, its diameter 21 mm.

The shell resembles Drillia grabaui but is much larger and stronger It contains 8 whorls without the protoconch, which is eroded in the single specimen found. The spiral sculpture consists of subequal, shallow, narrow grooves extending from the notch to the base of the whorls. The subsutural band is very slightly nodular. The transverse sculpture consists of fairly distinct ribs (13 on the body whorl) which become weaker and tend to fade out on the body whorl. The ribs extend from the notch to the succeeding suture and to about the center of the body whorl. The notch is distinct and broadly U-shaped. The siphonal canal is short and wide; aperture rather narrow. The outer lip is not lirate within. The columella shows a rather thick callus.

== Distribution ==
Fossils have been found in Chipola Formation, Florida, United States.
