= Moori =

Moori may refer to:

- Moori, Estonia, village in Saarepeedi Parish, Viljandi County, Estonia
- Moori Tips, Japanese manufacturer of pool and billiard cue tips

- Hideo Moori, the company's founder

== See also ==
- Mohri (disambiguation)
- Moree (disambiguation)
- Mori, Japanese and Italian surname
  - Mori (disambiguation)
- Mory (disambiguation)
- Mouri (disambiguation)
- Māori, indigenous people of New Zealand
