= Mohri =

Mohri may refer to:

== Places ==
- Mohri, a village in the Kurukshetra district of Haryana state in India

== People and fictional characters ==
- Mamoru Mohri (born 1948), Japanese astronaut
- Mehryar Mohri (born 1964), computer scientist

== See also ==
- Mohri, Hindu lower cast family name
- Moori (disambiguation)
- Moree (disambiguation)
- Mori, Japanese and Italian surname
  - Mori (disambiguation)
- Mory (disambiguation)
- Mouri (disambiguation)
