= Maury =

Maury may refer to:

== Places ==
=== Antarctica ===
- Maury Bay, Wilkes Land
- Maury Glacier, Palmer Land

=== Canada ===
- Maury Channel, Nunavut

=== France ===
- Maury, Pyrénées-Orientales, a town and commune
- Lac de Maury, a lake in Aveyron

=== United States ===
- Maury Mountains, Oregon
- Maury County, Tennessee
- Maury River, Virginia, a tributary of the James River
- Maury Island, a small island near Seattle, Washington

=== Outer space ===
- Maury (crater), a small crater on the Moon
- 3780 Maury, an asteroid

== Other uses ==
- List of storms named Maury, various tropical cyclones
- Maury (given name), a given name
- Maury (surname), a surname
- Maury (talk show), hosted by Maury Povich
- Maury AOC, an appellation for wines made in the Roussillon wine region of France
- USS Maury, various ships
- Maury, nickname for RMS Mauretania, early-1900s ocean liner

== See also ==
- Maury City, Tennessee, a town
- Mauri, people of the ancient north African kingdom Mauretania
  - Mauri (disambiguation)
- Mauries, a commune in France
- Mary (disambiguation)
- Mory (disambiguation)
- Murry (disambiguation)
- Mury (disambiguation)
- Morley (disambiguation)
