= Morey House =

Morey House may refer to:

in the United States (by state then town)

- Morey House (South Bend, Indiana), listed on the National Register of Historic Places (NRHP) in St. Joseph County
- Morey-Lampert House, South Bend, Indiana, listed on the NRHP in St. Joseph County
- F. F. Odenweller-James P. and Nettie Morey House, Des Moines, Iowa, listed on the NRHP in Polk County
- Knights-Morey House, Goshen, New Hampshire, listed on the NRHP in Sullivan County
- Morey House (Belton, Texas), listed on the NRHP in Bell County
- Morey-Andrews House, Waukesha, Wisconsin, listed on the NRHP in Waukesha County
- Morey-Lewis House, Waukesha, Wisconsin, listed on the NRHP in Waukesha County
- Morey-Seidens House, Waukesha, Wisconsin, listed on the NRHP in Waukesha County

== See also ==
- Morey Mansion, an 1890 Victorian house in Redlands, California
