= Moray (name) =

Moray is both a surname and a given name. Notable people with the name include:

Surname:

- Andrew Moray, military leader during the Anglo-Scottish conflict of the late 1290
- Ann Moray (1909–1981), Welsh singer and novelist
- Jim Moray (born 1981), English singer, multi-instrumentalist and record producer
- John Moray Stuart-Young (1881–1939), English poet
- Neville Moray (1935–2017), British-born Canadian psychologist
- Sir Robert Moray (1608/9–1673), Scottish soldier, freemason and natural philosopher
- Stella Moray (1923–2006), English actress
- Thomas Henry Moray (1892–1974), American inventor involved in "free energy" generation
- Ursula Moray Williams (1911–2006), children's writer and illustrator

Given name:

- Moray Callum (born 1958), Scottish automobile designer
- Moray Hunter (born 1958), Scottish comedian
- Moray Low (born 1984), Scottish rugby player
- Moray Watson (1928–2017), English actor

== See also ==
- Murray (disambiguation)
