= Morey (disambiguation) =

Morey is a village and commune in the Saône-et-Loire département of France.

Morey may also refer to:

== Places ==
- Morey Field or Middleton Municipal Airport, formerly known as Morey Field, a general aviation airport located in Middleton, WI, United States
- Morey, Michigan, unincorporated community

== Other uses ==
- Morey letter, American political forgery
- Morey Hole, pond in Plymouth, Massachusetts, United States
- Morey's Piers, amusement park located in Wildwood, New Jersey, United States

== People ==
=== Given name ===
- Morey Amsterdam (1908–1996), American actor
- Morey Doner (born 1994), Canadian soccer player
- Morey M. Dunlap (1860–1911), American lawyer and politician
- Morey Feld (1915–1971), American jazz drummer
- Morey Schapira (born 1949), American business executive and political activist
- Morey Leonard Sear (1929–2004), United States district judge

=== Surname ===
- Angel Morey, former Chief of Staff and Secretary of State of Puerto Rico
- Charles A. Morey (1851-1904), American attorney, educator, and inventor
- Daryl Morey (born 1972), American basketball executive
- Morey Doner (born 1994), Canadian soccer player
- Frank Morey (1840–1890), American politician
- George W. Morey (1888–1965), American geochemist and physical chemist
- Henry Lee Morey (1841–1902), American politician
- Lloyd Morey (1886–1965), American politician
- Mateu Morey (born 2000), Spanish soccer player
- Peter Morey (1798–1881), American politician
- Samuel Morey (1762–1843), American inventor
- Sean Morey (American football) (born 1976), American football player
- Sean Morey (comedian) (born 1953), American comedian
- Robert Morey (pastor) (1946–2019), American Christian apologist
- Tom Morey (1935–2021), American surfer and inventor
- Tom Morey (politician) (1906–1980), Australian politician
- Walt Morey (1907–1992), American children's author

== See also ==
- Moray, a council area in Scotland
  - Moray (disambiguation)
- Morey House (disambiguation)
- Moorey, surname
- Mory (disambiguation)
- Morrey, surname
- Maury (disambiguation)
- Morley (disambiguation)
