= Atlanta, Wisconsin =

- Town
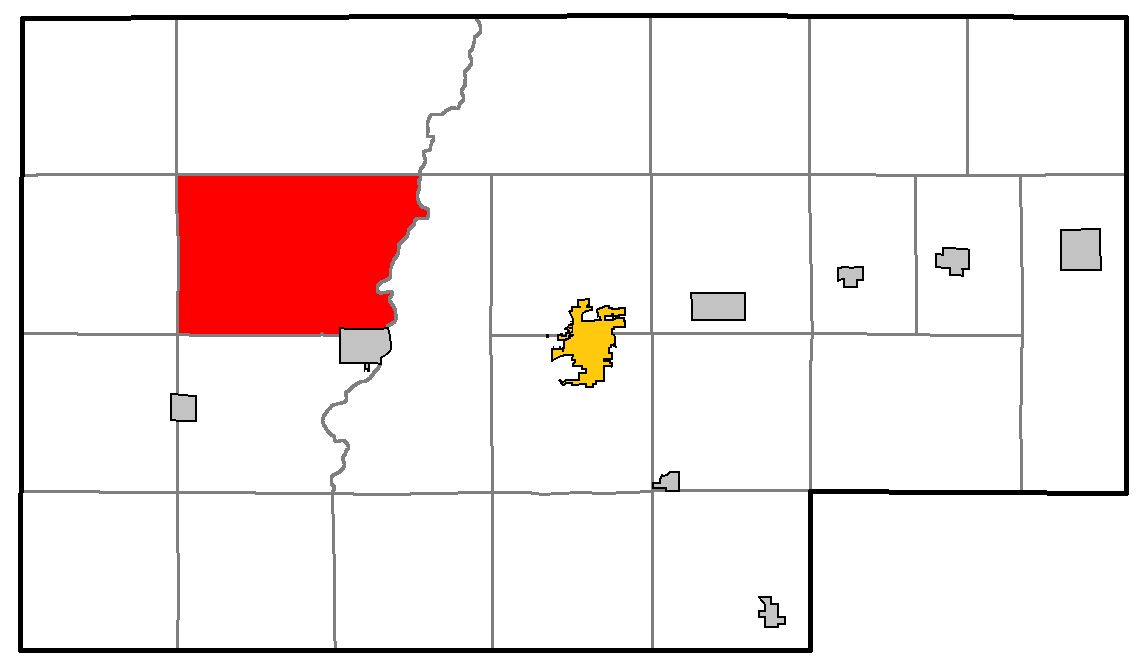
- Location of Atlanta within Rusk County

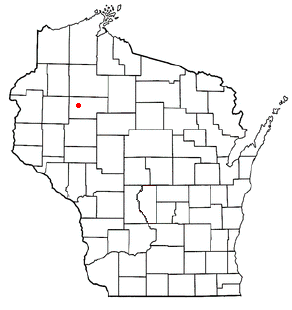
- Location of Atlanta, Wisconsin
- Coordinates: 45°29′37″N 91°19′42″W
- Country: United States
- State: Wisconsin
- County: Rusk

Area
  - Total: 51.0 sq mi (132.1 km^{2})
  - Land: 50.8 sq mi (131.6 km^{2})
  - Water: 0.19 sq mi (0.5 km^{2})
- Elevation: 1,243 ft (379 m)

Population (2020)
  - Total: 560
  - Density: 11/sq mi (4.3/km^{2})
- Time zone: UTC-6 (Central (CST))
  - Summer (DST): UTC-5 (CDT)
- Area codes: 715 & 534
- FIPS code: 55-03600
- GNIS feature ID: 1582728
- Website: https://townofatlanta.com/

Atlanta is a town in Rusk County, Wisconsin, United States. The population was 560 at the 2020 census. The unincorporated community of Imalone is located partially in the town.

== Geography ==
According to the United States Census Bureau, the town has a total area of 51.0 square miles (132.0 km^{2}), of which 50.8 square miles (131.5 km^{2}) is land and 0.2 square mile (0.5 km^{2}) (0.37%) is water.

== Demographics ==
As of the census of 2000, there were 627 people, 226 households, and 176 families residing in the town. The population density was 12.3 people per square mile (4.8/km^{2}). There were 273 housing units at an average density of 5.4 per square mile (2.1/km^{2}). The racial makeup of the town was 98.88% White, 0.64% Native American, 0.48% from other races. Hispanic or Latino of any race were 1.28% of the population.

There were 226 households, out of which 37.6% had children under the age of 18 living with them, 66.4% were married couples living together, 7.1% had a female householder with no husband present, and 22.1% were non-families. 17.7% of all households were made up of individuals, and 7.5% had someone living alone who was 65 years of age or older. The average household size was 2.77 and the average family size was 3.09.

In the town, the population was spread out, with 29.8% under the age of 18, 4.8% from 18 to 24, 27.4% from 25 to 44, 26.2% from 45 to 64, and 11.8% who were 65 years of age or older. The median age was 39 years. For every 100 females, there were 108.3 males. For every 100 females age 18 and over, there were 111.5 males.

The median income for a household in the town was $35,938, and the median income for a family was $39,643. Males had a median income of $29,500 versus $22,045 for females. The per capita income for the town was $19,055. About 10.3% of families and 17.0% of the population were below the poverty line, including 26.6% of those under age 18 and 18.8% of those age 65 or over.
