= Maurie =

Maurie is a masculine given name, sometimes a diminutive form (hypocorism) of Maurice. People named Maurie include:

- Maurie Beasy (1896–1979), Australian rules footballer
- Maurie Collins (1876–1943), Australian rules footballer
- Maurie Connell (1902–1975), Australian rules footballer
- Maurie Considine (1932–2023), former Australian rules footballer
- Maurie Daigneau (born 1950), American former college and World Football League quarterback
- Maurie Dunstan (1929–1991), Australian rules footballer
- Maurie Fa'asavalu (born 1980), Samoan rugby union player
- Maurie Fields (1926–1995), Australian actor, vaudeville performer and stand-up comedian
- Maurie Gibb (1914–2000), Australian rules footballer
- Maurie Hearn (1912–2004), Australian rules footballer
- Maurie Herring (1879–1962), Australian rules footballer
- Maurie Hunter (1904–1987), Australian rules footballer
- Maurie Johnson (1907–2000), Australian rules footballer
- Maurie Keane (1923–2014), Australian politician
- Maurie O'Connell (1917–2005), Australian rules footballer
- Maurie Sankey (1940–1965), Australian rules footballer
- Maurie Sheahan (1905–1956), Australian rules footballer
- Maurie Sheehy (1893–1961), Australian politician
- Maurie Wood (born 1944), former Australian rules footballer
- Maurie Young (1937–2023), former Australian rules footballer

== See also ==
- Maury (name), a given name and a surname
- Morrie, another given name
