= Nordic walking =

Cross-country walking with poles

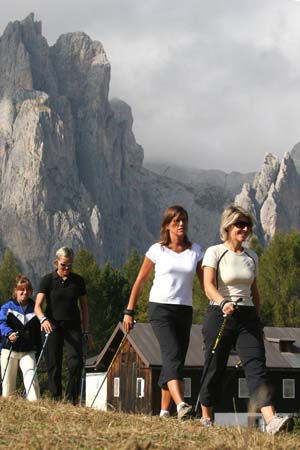
Nordic walkers in a park

Nordic walking is a Finnish-origin total-body version of walking that can be done both by non-athletes as a health-promoting physical activity and by athletes as a sport. The activity is performed with specially designed walking poles similar to ski poles.

== History ==
Nordic walking (originally Finnish sauvakävely) is fitness walking with specially designed poles. While trekkers, backpackers, and skiers had been using the basic concept for decades, Nordic walking was first formally defined with the publication of "Hiihdon lajiosa" (translation: "A part of cross-country skiing training methodic") by Mauri Repo in 1979. Nordic walking's concept was developed on the basis of off-season ski-training activity done using one-piece ski poles.

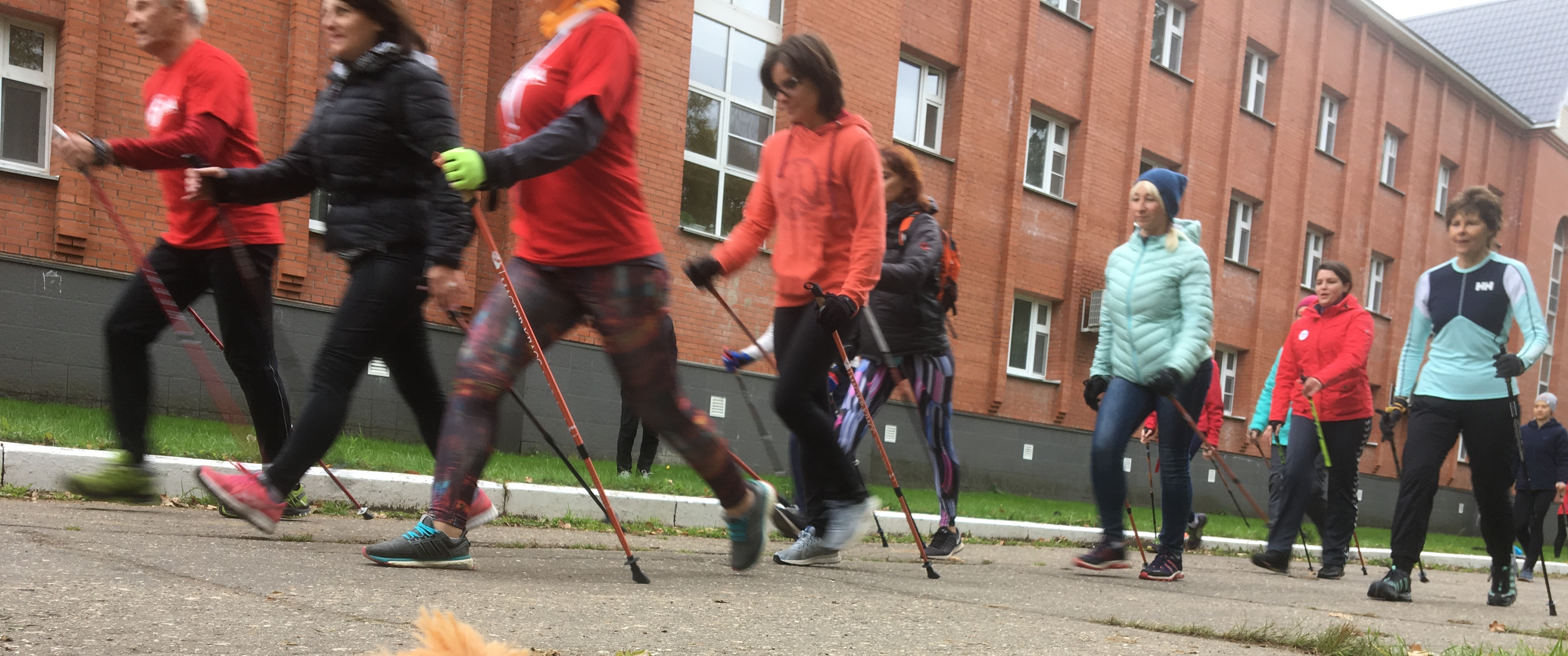
A Nordic walking group

For decades hikers and backpackers used their one-piece ski poles long before trekking and Nordic walking poles came onto the scene. Ski racers deprived of snow have always used and still do use their one-piece ski poles for ski walking and hill bounding. The first poles specially designed and marketed to fitness walkers were produced by Exerstrider of the US in 1988. Nordic Walker poles were produced and marketed by Exel in 1997. Exel coined and popularized the term 'Nordic Walking' in 1999.

== Benefits ==
Compared to regular walking, Nordic walking (also called pole walking) involves applying force to the poles with each stride. Nordic walkers use more of their entire body (with greater intensity) and receive fitness building stimulation not present in normal walking for the chest, latissimus dorsi muscle, triceps, biceps, shoulder, abdominals, spinal and other core muscles that may result in significant increases in heart rate at a given pace. Nordic walking has been estimated as producing up to a 46% increase in energy consumption, compared to walking without poles. Several research studies have been conducted on the effects of Nordic walking. One study in particular compared regular walking to Nordic walking. This study showed that Nordic walking led to more significant decreases in BMI and waist circumference compared to regular walking. The Nordic walking group was the only group that experienced reductions in total body fat and increases in aerobic capacity. Another research study that was done compared the effects of Nordic walking, conventional walking, and resistance-band training on overall fitness in older adults. The study concluded that while all three methods are useful for improving overall fitness, Nordic walking is the most effective. Research also shows that the better one's technique, the greater the benefits, with the INWA technique being most effective. Harvard Medical School has evidence that shows Nordic walking has more calorie burning characteristics than regular walking.

== Equipment ==
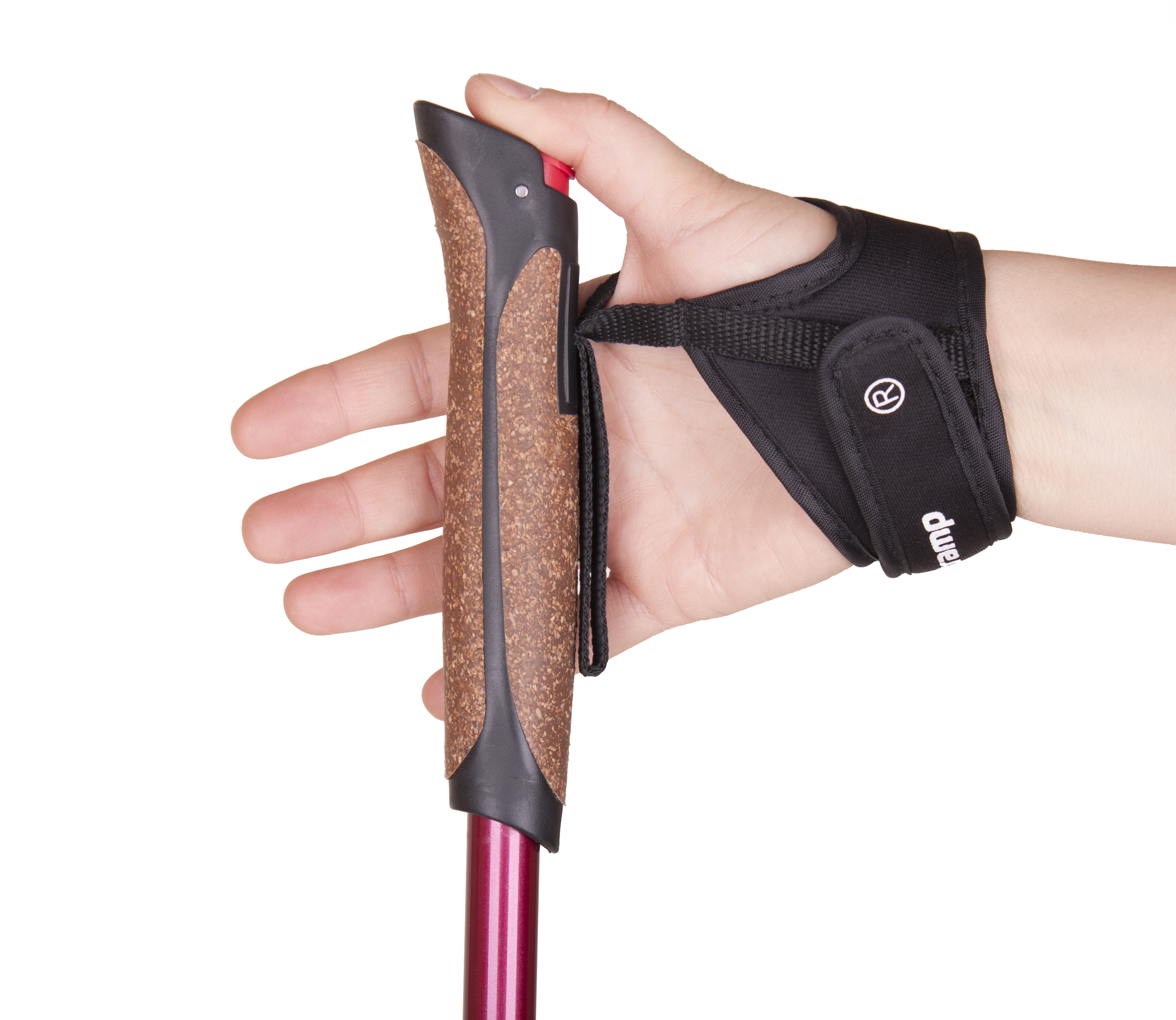
The handle of a walking pole

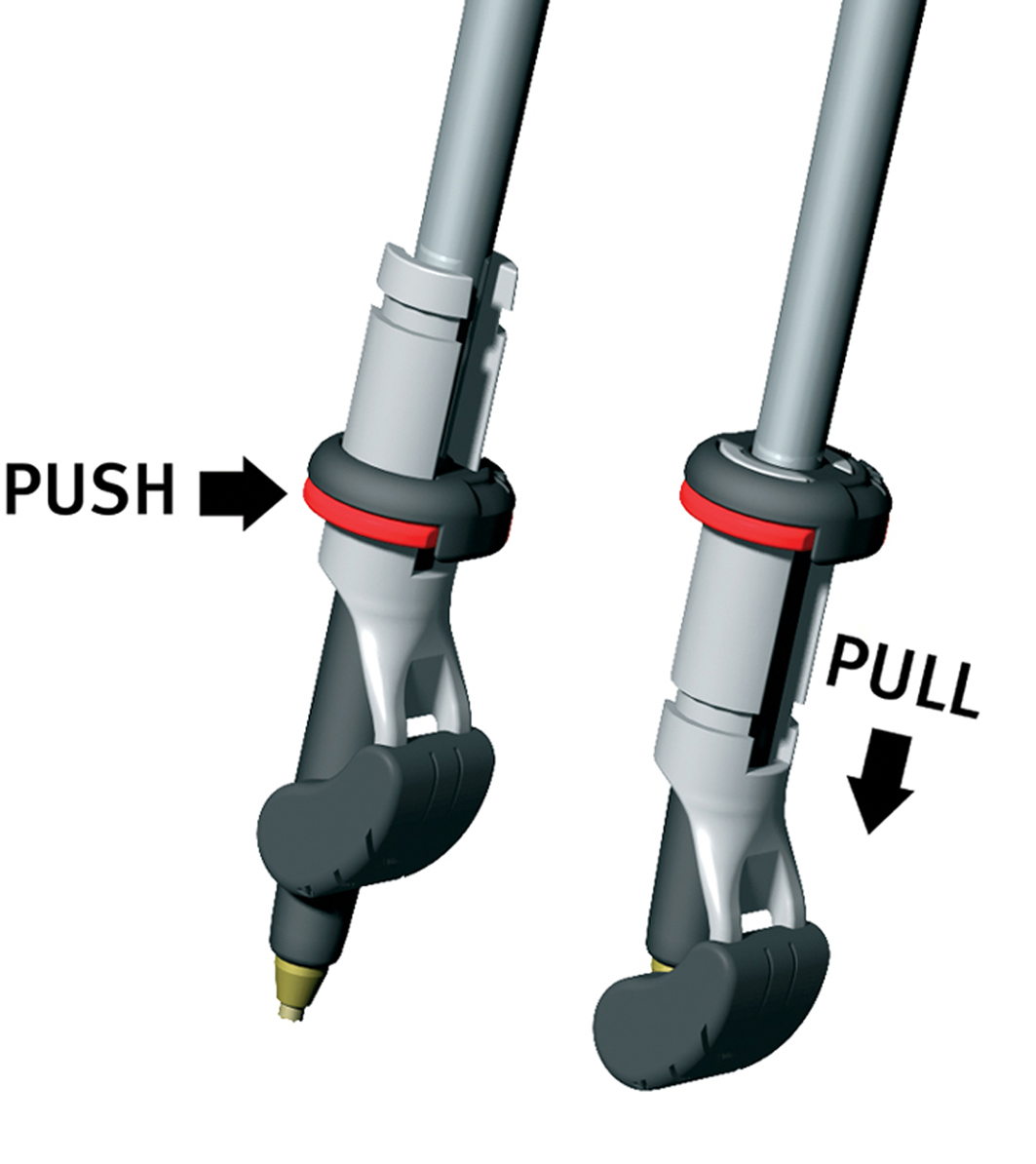
Spike for offroad and rubber for asphalt

Nordic walking poles are significantly shorter than those recommended for cross-country skiing. Nordic walking poles come in one-piece, non-adjustable shaft versions, available in varying lengths, and telescoping two or three piece twist-locking versions of adjustable length. One piece poles are generally stronger and lighter, but must be matched to the user. Telescoping poles are 'one-size fits all', and are more transportable.

Nordic walking poles feature a range of grips and wrist-straps, or rarely, no wrist-strap at all. The straps eliminate the need to tightly grasp the grips. As with many trekking poles, Nordic walking poles come with removable rubber tips for use on hard surfaces and hardened metal tips for trails, the beach, snow and ice. Most poles are made from lightweight aluminium, carbon fiber, or composite materials. Special walking shoes are not required, although there are shoes being marketed as specifically designed for the sport.

== Technique ==
The cadences of the arms, legs and body are, rhythmically speaking, similar to those used in normal, vigorous, walking. The range of arm movement regulates the length of the stride. Restricted arm movements will mean a natural restricted pelvic motion and stride length. The longer the pole thrust, the longer the stride and more powerful the swing of the pelvis and upper torso.

== See also ==
- Trekking pole
- Walking stick
- Cross country running
