= Bedtime Tales =

- Author: Yoko Mori
- Original title: 別タイトル: ベッドのおとぎばなし; Beddo no otogibanashi
- Translator: Sonya L. Johnson
- Language: Japanese
- Genre: Short Stories
- Publisher: Kodansha International
- Publication date: 1987
- Publication place: Japan
- English publication date: 1993
- Media type: Print (Paperback)
- Pages: 206 pp (US 1st edition)
- ISBN: 4-06-186097-6 (Japan English 1st edition)

Bedtime Tales (Japanese: 別タイトル: ベッドのおとぎばなし; Beddo no otogibanashi) (1987) is a collection of short stories published in 1987 by Japanese author Yoko Mori. The collection was translated by Sonya L. Johnson and was published by Kodansha under the Kodansha English Library series in 1993.

== Themes ==
The stories follow the same themes used in Mori's later works and follow the lives of Japanese women living in a male dominated Japan.

== Stories ==
- Sudden Shower - The 1st Night
- Credit Card - The 2nd Night
- Bloody Mary - The 3rd Night
- The Thirteenth Hour - The 4th Night
- Women Friends - The 6th Night
- Office Love - The 8th Night
- Christmas Eve - The 13th Night
- The Jade Earrings - The 15th Night
- The Woman in the Mirror - The 23rd Night
- A Call in the Night - The 24th Night
- The Thorn in the Rose - The 28th Night
- Home, Sweet Home - The 31st Night

== Sequel ==
Beddo no otogibanashi Part II was published in 1989 and is also another collection of short stories.
