= Mauri (surname) =

Mauri is a surname of Italian or Catalan origin. The census of 1553 in Catalonia registers the name Maurí or Mauri in a dozen towns. Notable people with the surname include:

- Angelo Mauri (1873–1936), Italian journalist and politician
- Carlo Mauri (1930–1982), Italian mountaineer and explorer
- Carolina Mauri (born 1969), Costa Rican freestyle swimmer
- Cristian Roig Mauri (born 1977), Andorran professional football player
- Melcior Mauri (born 1966), Catalan professional road bicycle racer
- Rosita Mauri (1849–1923), Catalan dancer
- Stefano Mauri (born 1980), Italian professional football player

== See also ==
- Mauro (surname)
- Maury (surname)
- Mauri_(disambiguation)
