= Murri =

Murri may refer to:

== People ==
- Murri people, Aboriginal Australians of Queensland and northwestern New South Wales
- Augusto Murri (1841-1932), Italian physician
- Romolo Murri (1870-1944), Italian politician and ecclesiastic
- Serafino Murri (b. 1966), Italian film critic, screenwriter, and film director

== Places ==
- Murri, an alternative spelling for Murree, a city and resort in Pakistan
- Murri River, Colombia

== Sports ==
- Murri Rugby League Carnival, an annual rugby league carnival in Queensland, Australia
- Murri Rugby League Team, a rugby league team in Australia

== Other uses ==
- Murri (condiment), a condiment used in Arab cuisine

== See also ==
- Marri, a Baloch tribe in Pakistan
- Muri (disambiguation)
- The Murri Affair, an alternative name in international release for Drama of the Rich
- Murri Country, a radio station in Brisbane
- Murri School, a school in Acacia Ridge
