= Imalone, Wisconsin =

- Unincorporated community
- Location within Wisconsin Location within the United States
- Coordinates: 45°33′08″N 91°13′39″W
- Country: United States
- State: Wisconsin
- County: Rusk
- Elevation: 1,119 ft (341 m)
- Time zone: UTC-6 (Central (CST))
  - Summer (DST): UTC-5 (CDT)
- Area codes: 715 & 534
- GNIS feature ID: 1577655

Imalone is an unincorporated community located in the towns of Atlanta and Murry, in Rusk County, Wisconsin, United States. Imalone is located along the Chippewa River and Wisconsin Highway 40, 9 miles (14 km) northwest of Ladysmith.

== History ==
The community was established by Snowball Anderson, who built a gas station in the area. The origin of the community's name is uncertain. According to one story, while Anderson's station was being run by Bill Granger, a salesman asked for the name of the place to use on an invoice. Granger replied, "I'm alone," meaning he could not ask what the name was, and the salesman wrote "Imalone" on the invoice. Another explanation states that Anderson named the community Imalone "because he was." Imalone has frequently been noted on lists of unusual place names.

The Imalone Bible Camp and Church, founded by Rev. Olaf Newhagen in 1940, was a major center of activity for many years, often attracting campers and counselors from Illinois, Michigan, and Minnesota. Newhagen, a Norwegian immigrant, was a highly respected member of the community who farmed during the week and preached on Sundays. In 1967, five years after his death, the church split over the issue of baptism. The majority of the active members then formed the Grace Bible Church in Bruce. In the late 1970s there was another exodus when the majority of the active members left to form the Living Waters Church about a mile north on State Highway 40. Since 1980 there has been little to no activity on the premises and the buildings are in disrepair. As of 2007, the community consisted of a bar called the Wagon Wheel and some houses.
