= Moray (disambiguation) =

Moray is one of the 32 current council areas of Scotland.

Moray may also refer to:

== Places in Scotland ==
- Moray Firth, a roughly triangular inlet of the North Sea
- Moray (Parliament of Scotland constituency), prior to 1707
- Moray (Scottish Parliament constituency), a constituency of the Scottish Parliament
- Moray (UK Parliament constituency), a constituency of the UK Parliament
- County of Moray, a registration county of Scotland

== History of Moray ==
- Mormaer of Moray, a former lordship of High Medieval Scotland destroyed in 1130
- Earl of Moray

== Military ==
- USS Moray (SS-300), a United States Navy submarine
- Moray class submarine, a submarine design of Rotterdamsche Droogdok Maatschappij

== Other uses ==
- Moray (name)
- Moray eel, a family of large eels found throughout the world's oceans
- Moray (Inca ruin), a town in Peru noted for a large complex of unusual Inca ruins (also named Muray in Quechua)
- Moray, Kansas, a community in the United States
- Moray Marathon, Scotland's longest running marathon
- Moray House School of Education, a school within the University of Edinburgh
- Moray Place, a major street in Dunedin, New Zealand
- Moray, an interactive 3-D modeling companion program to POV-Ray computer graphics software

== See also ==
- Moiré
- Morray (born 1993), American singer
- Morey (disambiguation)
- Morrey, a surname
- Murray (disambiguation)
