= Yoko Mori =

Japanese novelist, essayist, and translator

Yoko Mori (森瑤子) (November 4, 1940 – July 6, 1993) was a Japanese novelist, essayist, and translator who was known for writing popular romantic fiction. Her real name was Masayo Brackin (née Ito).

== Biography ==
- Mori Yoko was born in Ito City, Shizuoka Prefecture, as the eldest daughter of Ito Mitsuo and Kieko. Her real name was Masayo Ito. She had one younger brother and one younger sister.

- In 1941, due to her father's work, she lived in Manchu, China, until the age of four, returning to Japan just before the end of the war in March 1945.

- At the age of six, in 1946, she began learning the violin at her father's suggestion.

- In 1947, at the age of seven, her family moved from Yutenji to Shimokitazawa. During her elementary school years, she became familiar with the World Literature Collection.

- From 1949 to 1965, her mother hosted exchange students from various countries including the United States, Germany, and Cambodia at their home.

- At the age of 19, in 1959, she entered the Instrumental Music Department of Tokyo University of the Arts. She was drawn to French literature, including authors like Françoise Sagan, Jean-Paul Sartre, and Albert Camus. She lost much of her interest in the violin and began interacting with people from various fields such as poets and painters.

- At 23, in 1963, she graduated from Tokyo University of the Arts and worked at an advertising agency.

- At 24,1964 she met Ivan Brackin, an Englishman from Cheshire, and became engaged.

- At 25, in 1965, after six months of engagement, she married Ivan. They started their married life in an apartment in Higashi-Ikebukuro, then later moved to Denenchofu while both working.

- At 27, in 1967, their first daughter, Heather, was born. Mori left Asahi Advertising Agency and became a freelance copywriter to focus on childcare. They rented a house in Moriso at the tip of Miura Peninsula, where Mori became a full-time housewife. Later, their second daughter, Maria, and third daughter, Naomi Jane, were born.

- At 33, in 1973, they rented a house in Roppongi for their daughter Heather to attend an international school. During this time of childcare, Mori immersed herself in foreign works by authors such as Roald Dahl, Saki, and Ray Bradbury.

- At 37, in 1977, despite having a husband and children and living a comfortable life, Mori felt unbearably starved and desperate. Inspired by Ikeda Mitsuo's winning of the Akutagawa Prize for "To the Aegean Sea," she wrote "Joji(Affair)."

- At 38, in 1978, she won the 2nd Subaru Literary Award for "Affair," which was published in the December issue of "Subaru."

- At 39, in 1979, her work "Temptation" was published in "Subaru" in October and nominated for the 82nd Akutagawa Prize. Around the summer, she moved from Roppongi to Shimokitazawa. Around this time, they also began spending summers at a villa in Karuizawa (formerly owned by the Matsumata family, also known as the old Solomon villa).

- At 42, in 1982, her work "Wound" was nominated for the 85th Akutagawa Prize.

- At 43, in 1983, her work "Hot Wind" was nominated for the 88th Naoki Prize, and "Wind Story" was nominated for the 89th Naoki Prize. In September, her first original work, "Cradle, Boat, or Battlefield Every Night," was published by Kodansha. She actually underwent therapy while writing, transforming inner discoveries into words, and opened up a new frontier as a writer with a quiet tone.

- At 44, in 1984, she wrote the script for the TV drama "Onna Zakari" on Nippon Television (concurrently serialized by Kadokawa Shoten). In April, she began serializing the essay "Male and Female Telephone Wires" with art director Masaji Kamekai in "SAVVY" (continued until March 1991, published as "Let's Dance the Oklahoma Mixa Again" in 1986, "Roppongi Side by Side" in 1988, and "Delicious Pasta" in 1991).

- At 45, in 1985, her work "Screaming Me" (record of therapy with therapist Takayoshi Kono. Compiled as fiction in a non-fiction style from tapes during therapy while writing "Cradle, Boat, or Battlefield Every Night") was published by Shufu no Tomo.

- At 46, in 1986, she wrote "Family Portrait" in "Shincho" from May to August (published as "Family Report" by Shinchosha in 1988). In October, "The Moon of Asamizu Bay" was published in "Modern Novels," followed by "The Lobby" in November (later published as "The Moon of Asamizu Bay" by Kodansha in 1987 with added original stories). From November, "Love Story," a co-authored work with her husband Ivan Brackin, was written in "Monthly Kadokawa" (until October 1987, published as "Love Story" by Kadokawa Shoten in 1988).

- At 47, in 1987, she purchased Norway Island in Canada. They changed their summer resort from Karuizawa to Canada. In November, "Double Concerto" was published in the inaugural issue of "Novel Subaru." It was a novel experiment of the different perspectives of men and women that she had been doing in essays until then, now attempted in a novel format. As a writer, she entered a new realm following "Affair" and "Cradle, Boat, or Battlefield Every Night."

- At 49, in 1989, for the construction of their new home in Shimokitazawa, they moved to Ikedayama (Higashi-Gotanda). They also built a Spanish-style villa on Yoron Island.

- At 50, in 1990, they completed their new home in Shimokitazawa.

- At 51, in 1991, from March 4 to October 31, she published "TOKYO One Thousand and One Nights" in the evening edition of the Asahi Shimbun, in a complete short story format over 200 episodes (published as "Tokyo One Thousand and One Nights" by Asahi Shimbun in 1992). In April, the "Mori Yoko Collection" (a gift shop incorporating a chic adult sensibility) opened on the 4th floor of Takashimaya Nihonbashi.

- At 52, in 1992, "Scarlett" (written by Alexandra Ripley, translated by Mori Yoko) was published by Shinchosha as a sequel to "Gone with the Wind." For this work, she devoted almost a year, investing most of

== Style ==
Mori wrote love stories, often portraying unhappy marriages and divorces. There were very rarely happy endings, and after their affairs the protagonists typically found themselves in the same position as when the story began.

Her popularity came from an excellent understanding of social conditions in Japan during the 1980s, and she used that to write stories that fulfilled women's fantasies.[1] For that reason, her novels were very popular.[2]

Throughout her career, Mori continued to explore themes of identity, societal norms, and the human condition in her writing. Her works often reflected her deep empathy for her characters and her ability to capture the nuances of everyday life with poignancy and insight.

== Selected bibliography ==
=== Short story collections ===
- Joji (情事), 1978
- Yuwaku (誘惑), 1980
- Beddo no otogibanashi (ベッドのおとぎばなし), 1986
- Tuinkuru monogatari (トウィンクル物語), 1992

=== Novels ===
- Dezato wa anata (デザートはあなた), 1991
- Yogoto no yurikago, fune, aruiwa senjo (夜ごとの揺り籠、舟、あるいは戦場), 1986

=== Translations ===
- Scarlett by Alexandra Ripley, 1992.
