= Murry =

Murry may refer to:

== People ==
=== Given name ===
- Murry Bartow (born 1961), American basketball coach
- Murry Bowden (born 1949), American football player
- Murry Dickson (1916–1989), American baseball player
- Murry Hope (1929–2012), English writer and occultist
- Murry R. Nelson (born 1947), American professor of Education and American studies
- Murry S. King (1870–1927), American architect
- Murry Salby, American atmospheric scientist
- Murry Sidlin (born 1940), American conductor and professor
- Murry Wilson (1917–1973), American musician, record producer, and businessman

=== Surname ===
- Charles Wallace Murry Madeleine L'Engle fictional character
- Don Murry (1899-1951), American football player
- Dylan Murry (born 2000), American racing driver
- George V. Murry (1948-2020), American Roman Catholic bishop
- John Murry (musician), American indie musician
- John Middleton Murry, English writer
- John Middleton Murry Jr. (also known as Colin Murry), English writer
- Meg Murry Madeleine L'Engle fictional character
- Paul Murry, artist who worked for Walt Disney's Comics and Stories
- Sandy and Dennys Murry, Madeleine L'Engle fictional characters

== Places ==
- Murry, Wisconsin, United States, a town
  - Murry (community), Wisconsin, United States, an unincorporated community

== See also ==
- List of Irish-language given names
- Murray (disambiguation)
- Mury (disambiguation)
- Maury (disambiguation)
