= Masayuki Mori =

Masayuki Mori may refer to:

- Masayuki Mori (actor) (森 雅之, 1911–1973), Japanese actor in Akira Kurosawa's films
- Masayuki Mori (film producer) (森 昌行, born 1953), Japanese film producer
