= Masako Mori =

Masako Mori may refer to:

- Masako Mori (politician) (森 まさこ, born 1964), Japanese politician
- Masako Mori (singer) (森 昌子, born 1958), Japanese enka singer and former 1970s idol
- Masako Mori (writer) (森 真沙子, born 1944), Japanese novelist
