= Hiroshi Mori =

Hiroshi Mori may refer to:

- Hiroshi Mori (astronomer) (森 弘, born 1958), Japanese amateur astronomer
- Hiroshi Mori (writer) (森 博嗣, born 1957), Japanese writer and engineer
