= Mauri Valtonen =

Finnish astronomer

Mauri Valtonen (born 1945) is a Finnish astronomer and professor at the University of Turku. His fields of scientific interest include active galaxies, cosmology, and the three-body problem.

Valtonen completed a Ph.D. from Cambridge University in 1975. He served as Director of Tuorla Observatory from 1980 to 2002 and returned to this position again in 2007.

Animation of black hole disk flares in OJ 287

In 2008, Valtonen led a research team which argued that delay in the periodic outbursts from the nucleus of the active galaxy OJ 287 confirmed Albert Einstein's general theory of relativity.

== Books by Mauri Valtonen ==
- Valtonen, M. & Karttunen, H. (2006). The Three-Body Problem. 251 pages. Cambridge University Press.
- Byrd, G. G., Chernin A. D. & Valtonen M. (2007). Cosmology: Foundations and Frontiers. Moscow: URSS.
