= Mauri, Estonia =

Village in Estonia

Mauri
- Village
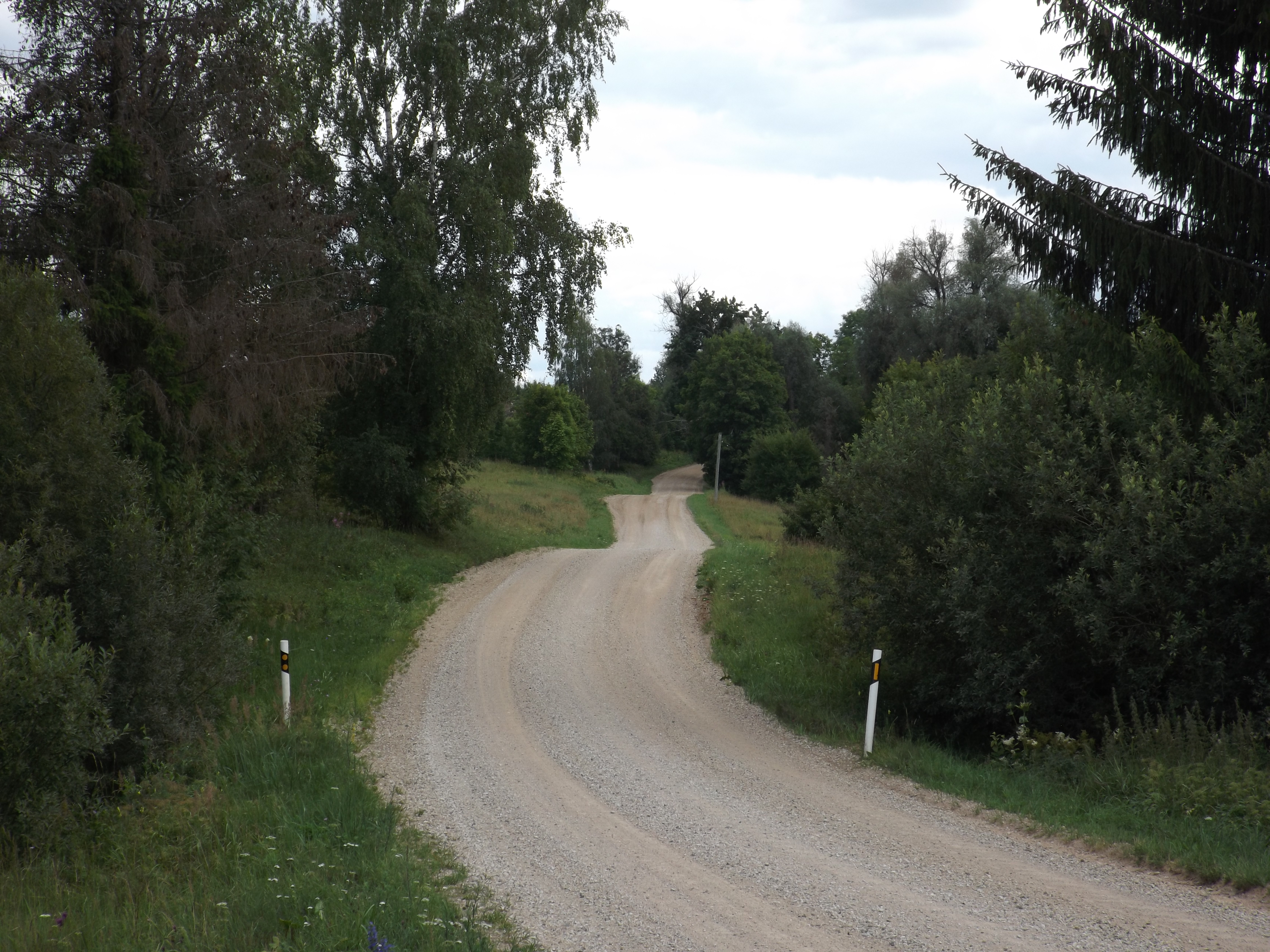
- Road through Mauri

- Location within Estonia
- Coordinates: 57.6764°N 27.2717°E
- Country: Estonia
- County: Võru County
- Parish: Rõuge Parish
- Time zone: UTC+2 (EET)
  - Summer (DST): UTC+3 (EEST)

Mauri is a village in Rõuge Parish, Võru County in Estonia.
