= Murry, Wisconsin =

Town of Murry
- Town
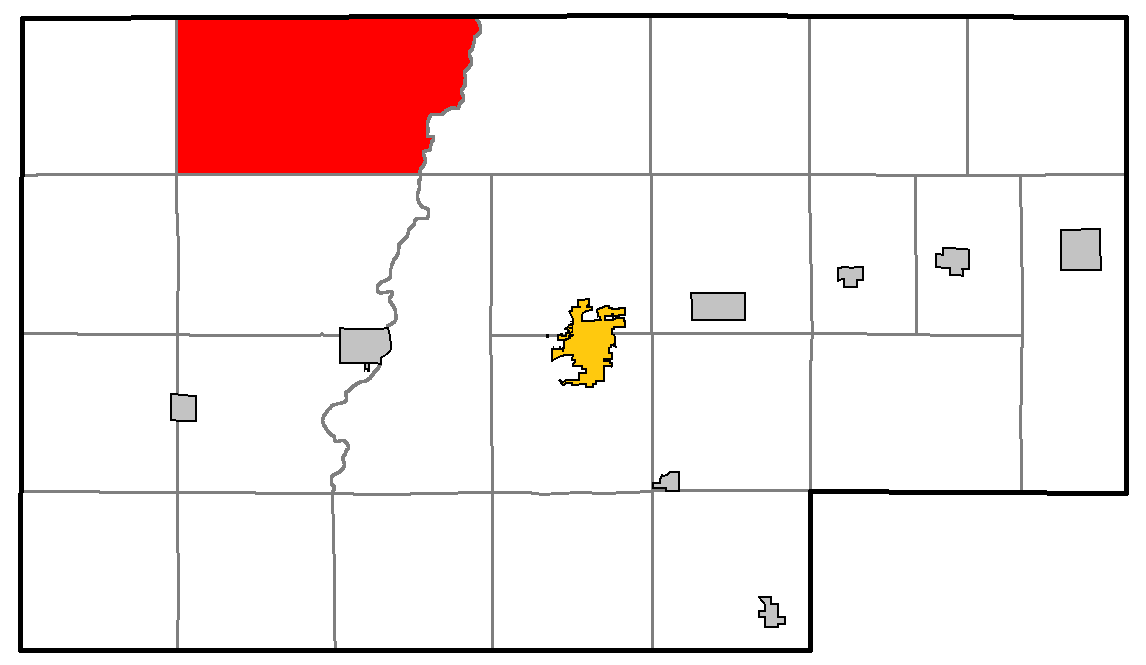
- Location of Murry within Rusk County

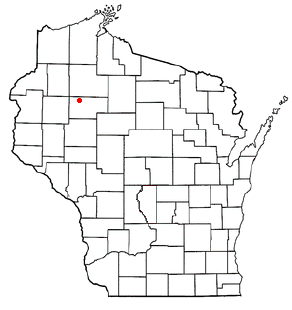
- Location of the Town of Murry
- Coordinates: 45°34′51″N 91°17′12″W
- Country: United States
- State: Wisconsin
- County: Rusk

Area
  - Total: 62.1 sq mi (160.9 km^{2})
  - Land: 61.9 sq mi (160.2 km^{2})
  - Water: 0.27 sq mi (0.7 km^{2})
- Elevation: 1,499 ft (457 m)

Population (2020)
  - Total: 247
  - Density: 3.99/sq mi (1.54/km^{2})
- Time zone: UTC-6 (Central (CST))
  - Summer (DST): UTC-5 (CDT)
- Area codes: 715 & 534
- FIPS code: 55-55175
- GNIS feature ID: 1583772
- Website: www.townofmurry.com

The Town of Murry is located in Rusk County, Wisconsin, United States. The population was 247 at the 2020 census. The unincorporated community of Imalone is partially located in the town.

== Geography ==
According to the United States Census Bureau, the town has a total area of 62.1 square miles (160.9 km^{2}), of which 61.8 square miles (160.2 km^{2}) is land and 0.3 square mile (0.7 km^{2}) (0.43%) is water.

== Demographics ==
As of the census of 2000, there were 275 people, 116 households, and 77 families residing in the town. The population density was 4.4 people per square mile (1.7/km^{2}). There were 162 housing units at an average density of 2.6 per square mile (1.0/km^{2}). The racial makeup of the town was 98.18% White, 0.73% from other races, and 1.09% from two or more races. Hispanic or Latino of any race were 0.36% of the population.

There were 116 households, out of which 20.7% had children under the age of 18 living with them, 58.6% were married couples living together, 6.9% had a female householder with no husband present, and 32.8% were non-families. 27.6% of all households were made up of individuals, and 15.5% had someone living alone who was 65 years of age or older. The average household size was 2.37 and the average family size was 2.88.

In the town, the population was spread out, with 21.1% under the age of 18, 4.7% from 18 to 24, 23.3% from 25 to 44, 29.5% from 45 to 64, and 21.5% who were 65 years of age or older. The median age was 46 years. For every 100 females, there were 102.2 males. For every 100 females age 18 and over, there were 102.8 males.

The median income for a household in the town was $31,000, and the median income for a family was $33,125. Males had a median income of $30,795 versus $17,000 for females. The per capita income for the town was $16,853. About 10.8% of families and 16.0% of the population were below the poverty line, including 7.1% of those under the age of eighteen and 33.3% of those 65 or over.
