= Lac de Maury =

Lake in France

- Location within France
- Location: Aveyron
- Coordinates: 44°39′40″N 2°41′0″E
- Basin countries: France

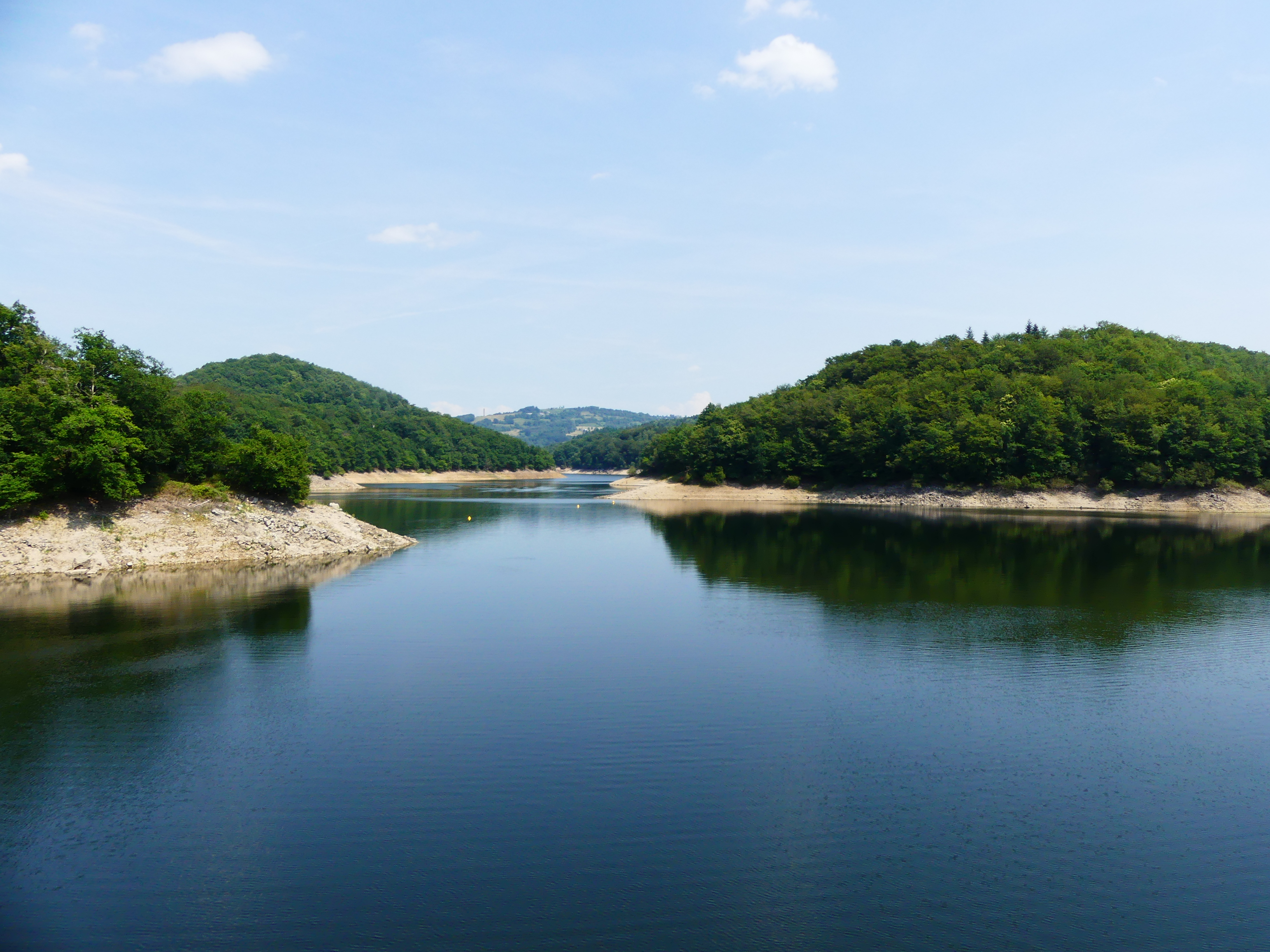
Lac de Maury

Lac de Maury is a dam lake in Aveyron, France. In 2019, a water park was opened on the lake.
