= Muri Dam =

Dam in Hokkaidō, Japan

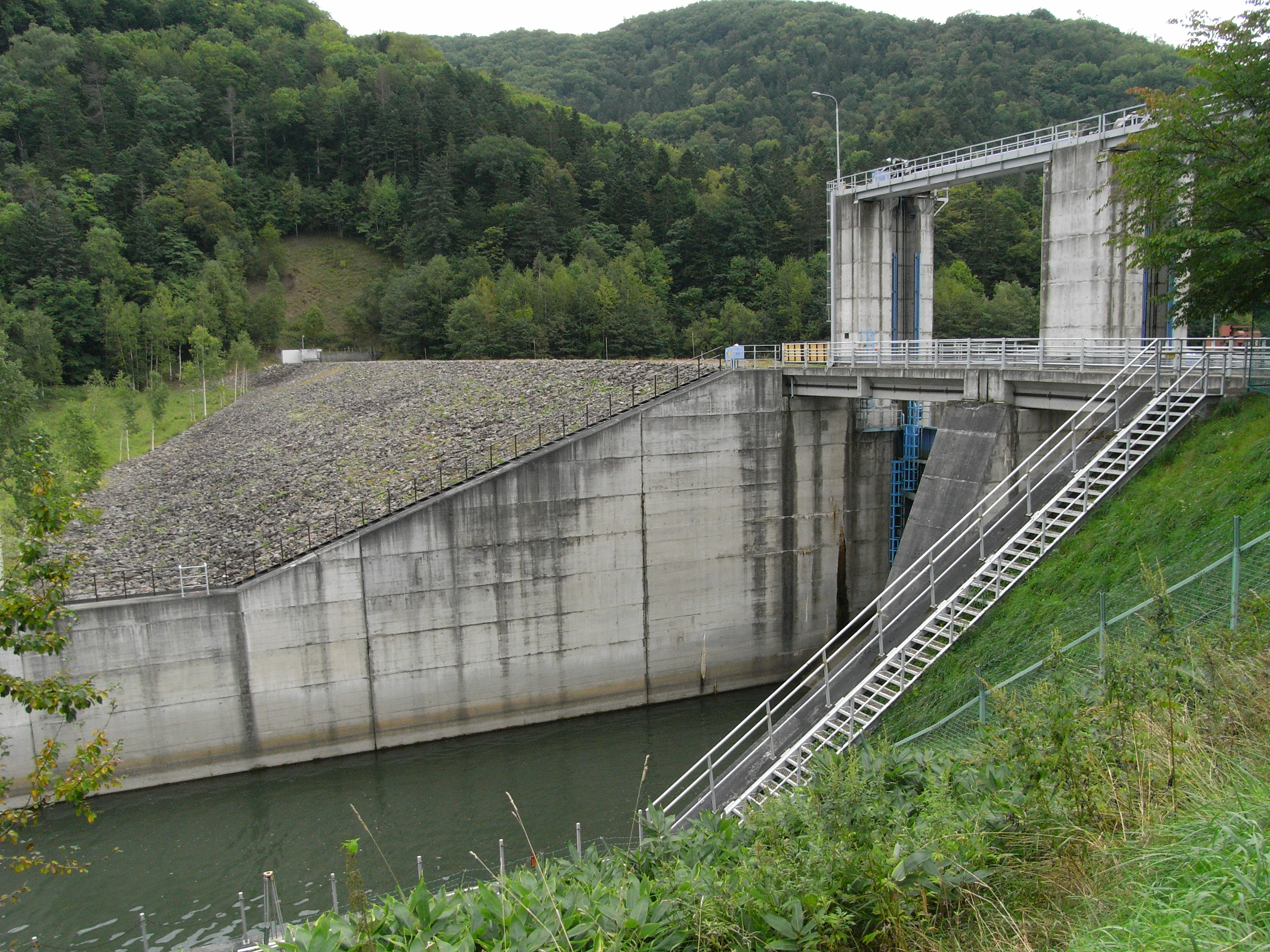
- Interactive map of Muri Dam
- Location: Hokkaidō, Japan.
- Coordinates: 43°56′30″N 143°20′23″E

Dam and spillways
- Impounds: Muri River

The Muri Dam is a dam in Hokkaidō, Japan, completed in 1980.
