= Morey House (South Bend, Indiana) =

- U.S. National Register of Historic Places
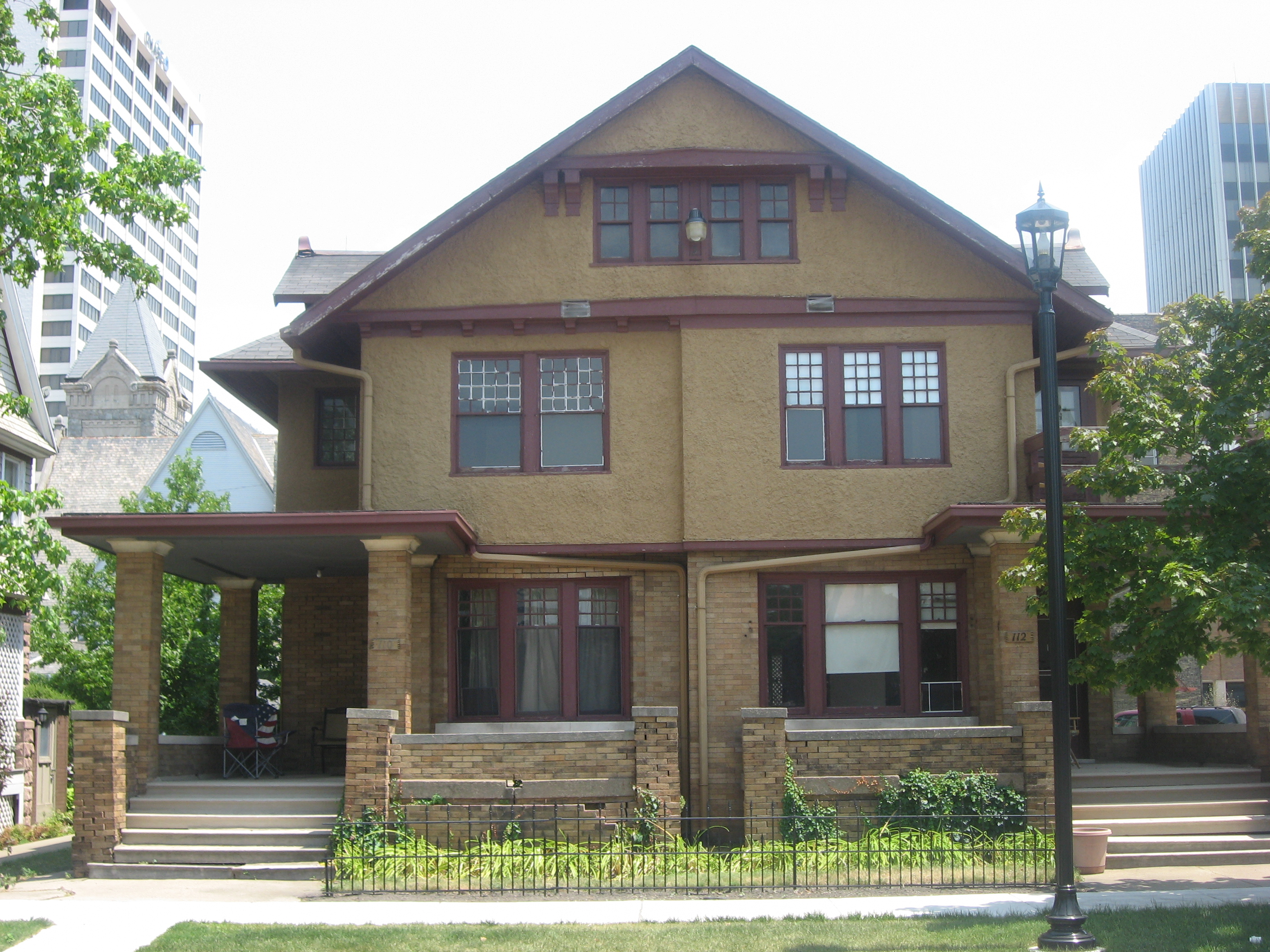
- Morey House, July 2012

- Location within Indiana Location within the United States
- Location: 110-112 Franklin Pl., South Bend, Indiana
- Coordinates: 41°40′33″N 86°15′16″W
- Area: less than one acre
- Built: 1909
- Architectural style: English/Craftsman Vernacular
- MPS: Downtown South Bend Historic MRA
- NRHP reference No.: 85001222
- Added to NRHP: June 5, 1985

Morey House is a historic apartment house located at South Bend, Indiana. It was built in 1909, and is a large 2 1/2-story, building with a brick first story and stuccoed upper stories in an American Craftsman vernacular style. It has an irregular plan and features two small square porches with balconies on the corners of the front facade.

It was listed on the National Register of Historic Places in 1985.
