= Maury (crater) =

Small impact crater on the Moon

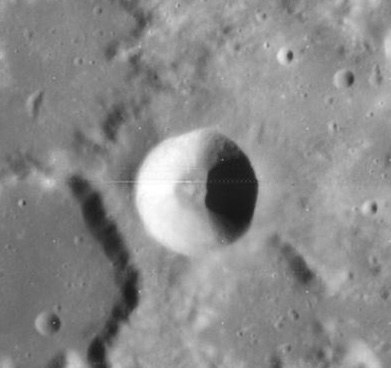
- Lunar Orbiter 4 image
- Coordinates: 37.1°N 39.6°E
- Diameter: 18 km
- Depth: 3.3 km
- Colongitude: 321° at sunrise
- Eponym: Matthew Fontaine Maury; Antonia Maury

Maury is a small lunar impact crater named for two cousins. It was first named in honor of Lieutenant Matthew Fontaine Maury of the U. S. Naval Observatory and later shared to honor Antonia Maury of Harvard College Observatory. The crater lies in the northeastern part of the Moon, just to the east of the Lacus Somniorum. The nearest named craters are Hall to the southwest, and Cepheus farther to the northeast. Just to the west of Maury is the lava-flooded remains of the satellite crater Maury C.

This is a young bowl-shaped crater with a circular rim and a tiny flat floor at the midpoint. The surface of the floor has a cluster of small hills. The inner walls appear lighter than the surrounding terrain due to higher albedo. This is normal for recently formed craters, and the interior will gradually grow darker due to space weathering. The brightness of Maury is also noticeable on the photographic version of chart LAC 27 (page 54) in The Clementine Atlas of the Moon (Ben Bussey / Paul D. Spudis).

== Satellite craters ==
By convention these features are identified on lunar maps by placing the letter on the side of the crater midpoint that is closest to Maury.

Maury	Latitude	Longitude	Diameter
A	36.0° N	41.8° E	21 km
B	35.1° N	42.0° E	9 km
C	37.0° N	38.6° E	28 km
D	38.2° N	37.8° E	8 km
J	39.1° N	40.1° E	6 km
K	39.5° N	41.1° E	5 km
L	40.3° N	42.5° E	4 km
M	40.8° N	42.6° E	16 km
N	40.4° N	41.9° E	17 km
P	39.9° N	38.0° E	12 km
T	40.0° N	43.3° E	3 km
U	39.3° N	37.0° E	5 km
