= Satoshi Mori =

Satoshi Mori may refer to:

- Satoshi Mori (basketball) (森 哲, born 1949), Japanese basketball player
- Satoshi Mori (skier) (森 敏, born 1971), Japanese Nordic combined skier
