= Masahiro Mori =

Masahiro Mori may refer to:

- Masahiro Mori (roboticist) (森 政弘, 1927–2025), Japanese roboticist
- Masahiro Mori (designer) (森 正洋, 1927–2005), Japanese ceramic designer
