= Morrie Ewans =

Australian rules footballer

Personal information
- Full name: Morris Ewans
- Born: 16 January 1894; Clunes, Victoria
- Died: 23 June 1971 (aged 77); Parkville, Victoria
- Original team: Brunswick
- Height: 180 cm (5 ft 11 in)
- Weight: 81 kg (179 lb)

Playing career^{1}
| Years | Club | Games (Goals) |
| 1919–21 | Carlton | 18 (0) |
- ^{1} Playing statistics correct to the end of 1921.

Morrie Ewans (16 January 1894 – 23 June 1971) was an Australian rules footballer who played with Carlton in the Victorian Football League (VFL).
