= Sarah Mytton Maury =

English author (1801–1849)

Sarah Mytton Maury (1 November 1801 – 21 September 1849) was an English writer, born in Liverpool to Bridget Tobin and William Hughes.

Sarah had a sister named Elizabeth Hughes who lived in the United States. Sarah graduated from school in Liverpool in 1821 and later married William Maury, the eldest son of "Consul" James Maury (son of the Reverend James Maury and cousin of Matthew Fontaine Maury.)

Sarah and William Maury had eight sons and three daughters:

1. James Maury (b. 1829)
2. Harriet Van Ness Maury (b. 1830)
3. William Morris Maury Jr. (b. 1831), called affectionately "the Doctor"
4. Anne Fontaine Maury (b. 1832)
5. Rutson Maury (b. 1834)
6. Matthew Fontaine Maury (b. 1835)
7. Sarah Fanny Maury (b. 1836)
8. Charles William Maury (8 December 1837 – 30 October 1857)
9. Mytton Maury (b. 1839), father of astronomer Antonia Maury and paleontologist Carlotta Maury
10. Walker Maury (b. 1840)
11. Tobin Morris Maury (b. England 9 October 1841, d. Bridgeport Connecticut)

Sarah Maury emigrated to the United States in 1846 on a Packet ship that was crowded with steerage passengers, among whom smallpox had broken out on the third day from Liverpool.

Upon her arrival in America, she labored successfully for the passage of an act of Congress requiring that sanitary provision should be made on emigrant vessels. On her return to England she procured the passage of a similar act of England's Parliament.

Upon her return, the London Times wrote of her:

We can easily account for Mrs. Maury's enthusiasm for America. Such a man as her father-in-law, the late James Maury, the friend and play-fellow of Thomas Jefferson, was one whose merits could never fail to be appreciated by any; he maintained the honour and interests of his country in England for fifty years. Some of Mr. Maury's earliest impressions of America must have been derived from her communications with that excellent man, and the inheritors of his name, and not less of his amiable qualities, and these, together with the pleasure he must have had in her friendly communications with the many agreeable and intelligent American families residing in Liverpool, would naturally give her a more favourable impression of the people of that country. The courtesy with which everyone bearing the name of Maury, and especially a lady, would be received in the United States must have made her visit to Washington delightful, and have cast a couleur de rose on everything that she saw. Add to this, that America is full of objects calculated to excite the admiration and respect of every intelligent traveler, and we cannot wonder that Mrs. Maury has come back more American than the Americans themselves.

She wrote Etchings from the Caracci (Liverpool, 1842); An Englishwoman in America (1846); The Statesmen of America in 1846 (Philadelphia, 1847); and Progress of the Catholic Church in America (1847).

She died of typhus fever contracted from an infected well and was buried in the city cemetery of Fredericksburg, Virginia beside her husband.

== Sources ==
- Appleton's Encyclopedia, vol. 4, p. 266
- An Englishwoman in America, free .pdf book
- The Statesmen of America in 1846, free .pdf book
