= F. F. Odenweller–James P. and Nettie Morey House =

Historic house in Iowa, United States

- U.S. National Register of Historic Places
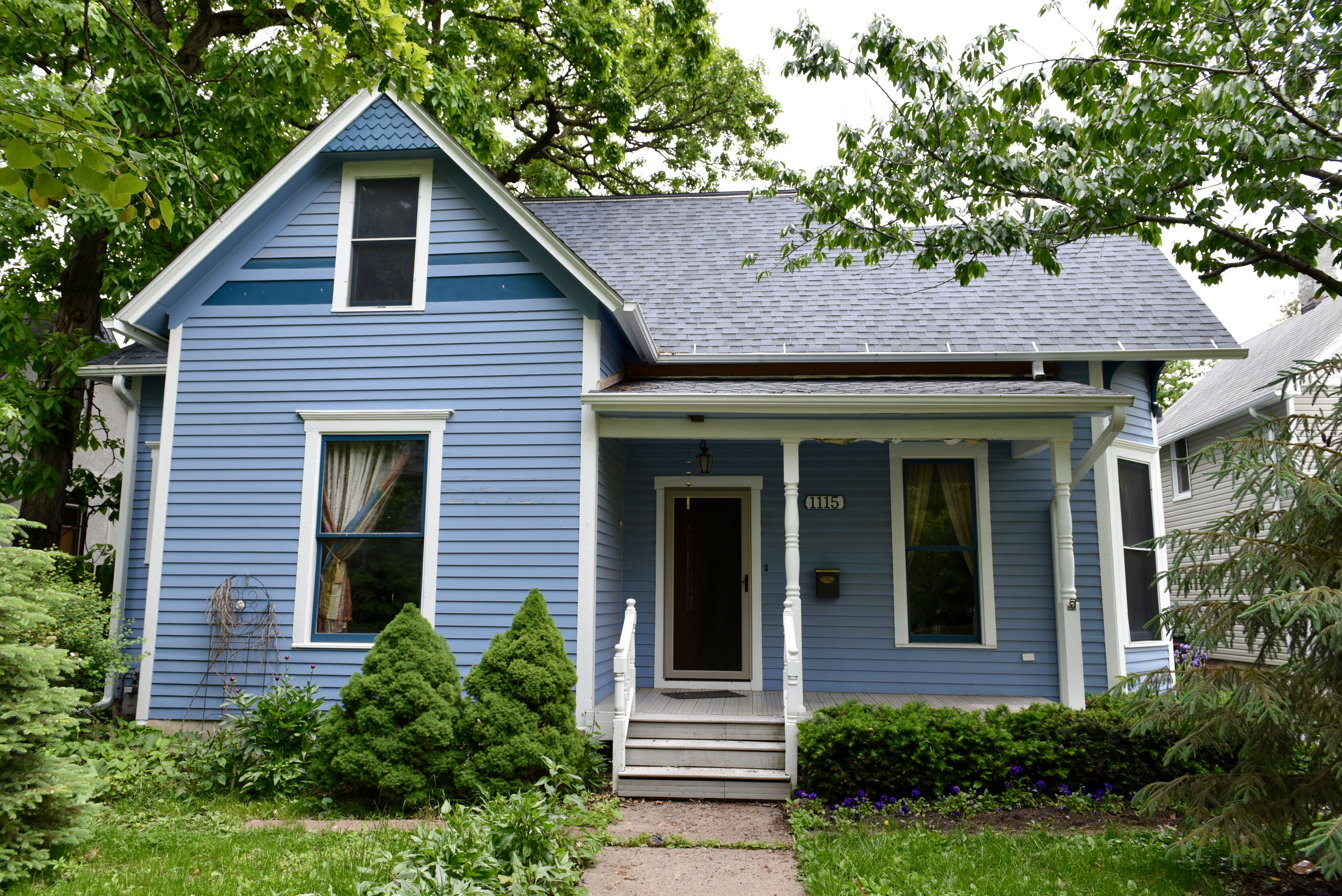

- Location within Iowa Location within the United States
- Location: 1115 27th St. Des Moines, Iowa
- Coordinates: 41°35′56″N 93°39′11″W
- Area: less than one acre
- Built: 1896
- Architectural style: Late Victorian
- MPS: Drake University and Related Properties in Des Moines, Iowa, 1881--1918 MPS
- NRHP reference No.: 88001337
- Added to NRHP: November 1, 1988

The F. F. Odenweller–James P. and Nettie Morey House is a historic building located in Des Moines, Iowa, United States. It is a 1½-story frame cottage that follows an irregular plan. It features chamfered corners, Stick Style strips, moulded lintels, beaded corner boards, decorative shinglework, and a small front porch with a shed roof. The property on which it stands is one of ten plats that were owned by Drake University. The University sold the lot to Delos Cutler, one of the University Land Company organizers, in 1887. The next year he sold the property to F.F. Odenweller. After seven years the property was sold to A.A. Smith and O.E. Bowers. In 1896, the year the house was built, the property was sold to J.P. Morey, and he owned it for twenty-three years. Its significance is attributed to the effect of the University's innovative financing techniques upon the settlement of the area around the campus. The house was listed on the National Register of Historic Places in 1988.
