= Takeshi Mori =

Takeshi Mori may refer to:

- Takeshi Mori (commander) (森 赳, 1894–1945), commander of the Japanese Empire's First Imperial Guards Division, at the end of World War II
- Takeshi Mori (director) (もり たけし, born 1963), anime director, storyboard artist, and script writer
- Takeshi Mori (announcer) (森 武史, born 1959), announcer on Yomiuri TV in Japan
- Takeshi Mori (voice actor) (森 岳志), Japanese voice actor who has supplied voices for a number of video games including Fist of the North Star: Ken's Rage and Ace Combat Zero: The Belkan War
