= Thomas Henry Moray =

American inventor (1892–1974)

Thomas Henry Moray (August 28, 1892 - May 18, 1974) was an inventor from Salt Lake City, Utah. He received US patent 2,460,707, "Electrotherapeutic Device", in February 1949, after a process of 17 years in discussions with the patent office.

During the 1920s, Moray worked in the emerging field of radio. After hundreds of experiments designed to improve radio reception, Moray claimed to have discovered a source of energy transmission apparently available everywhere. Using advanced ideas in solid state detectors, he developed a power source which he claimed to produce 50,000 watts. By the early 1930s, dozens of people had reportedly witnessed demonstrations of this technology.

In 1944 Moray was paid $25 a day by the rural electrification administration to perfect his system of drawing electrical energy out of the atmosphere. He claimed his invention produced electricity with no exterior input of energy. The primary component of the device was a non-heated vacuum tube. At the time most vacuum tubes had heaters built inside. The patent office refused to grant his patent, initially, because they claimed that any vacuum tube without a heater would not work. He was never granted a patent for his power supply device. He did have other inventions and was able to obtain a patent for one of those, the Electrotherapeutic device.
