= Antonia Maury =

American astronomer (1866–1952)

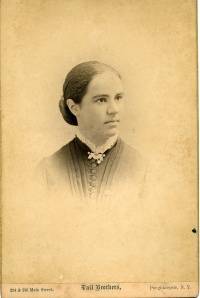
- Born: March 21, 1866; Cold Spring, New York, U.S.
- Died: January 8, 1952 (aged 85); Dobbs Ferry, New York, U.S.
- Education: Vassar College
- Awards: Annie Jump Cannon Award in Astronomy (1943)
- Scientific career
- Fields: Astronomy
- Workplaces: Harvard College Observatory
- Academic advisors: Maria Mitchell

Antonia Caetana de Paiva Pereira Maury (March 21, 1866 – January 8, 1952) was an American astronomer who was the first to detect and calculate the orbit of a spectroscopic binary. She published an important early catalog of stellar spectra using her own system of stellar classification, which was later adopted by the International Astronomical Union. She also spent many years studying the binary star Beta Lyrae. Maury was part of the Harvard Computers, a group of female astronomers and human computers at the Harvard College Observatory. Dorrit Hoffleit described Maury as an "independent Renegade", suffering at the Observation for her Independence not agreeing with the way Edward Charles Pickering had them working for minimal credit.

Antonia Maury was awarded the Annie Jump Cannon Award in Astronomy in 1943. William Wilson Morgan, one of the developers of the MK system of stellar classification, which builds upon her work, has said that he considers Antonia Maury "for me, the single greatest mind that has ever engaged itself in the field of the morphology of stellar spectra."

== Early life and education ==
Caetana de Paiva Pereira Maury was born in Cold Spring, New York, on March 21, 1866. She was named in honor of her maternal grandmother, Antonia Caetana de Paiva Pereira Gardner Draper, the daughter of a physician at the court of John VI of Portugal and Charlotte of Spain. The family fled Portugal for Brazil because of the Napoleonic Wars.

Maury's father was the Reverend Mytton Maury, an amateur naturalist, a direct descendant of the Reverend James Maury and one of the sons of Sarah Mytton Maury. Maury's mother was Virginia Draper, a daughter of Antonia Caetana de Paiva Pereira Gardner and Dr. John William Draper.

Maury was also the granddaughter of John William Draper and a niece of Henry Draper and his wife Mary Anna Draper, all pioneering astronomers. Mary Anna Draper funded research at Harvard College Observatory through the creation of the Henry Draper Memorial Fund. As a result of their family connections, Antonia and her two siblings were exposed to science at a very early age. Her younger sister, Carlotta Maury, went on to become a geologist, stratigrapher, and paleontologist.

Antonia Maury attended Vassar College, graduating in 1887 with honors in physics, astronomy, and philosophy. At Vassar she studied under the tutelage of renowned astronomer Maria Mitchell. She was one of seven graduates chosen to give an addresses at her commencement.

== Career ==
After completing her undergraduate work, Maury went to work at the Harvard College Observatory as one of the so-called Harvard Computers, highly skilled women who processed astronomical data. Her pay was 25 cents an hour, half the amount paid to men at that time. Authors of the book on the Harvard College Observatory described Maury as "the most original as well as the most elusive personality among the women astronomers at Harvard" due to her strong independence and disapproval of Pickering's undermining of the groups work.

In 1887, Edward Charles Pickering had found the first spectroscopic binary or double star, ζ^{1} Ursae Majoris (Mizar A). Maury was asked to determine its orbit, which she did using periodic doubling of some of the lines in its spectrum. Then, in 1889, Maury discovered a second spectroscopic binary, Beta Aurigae, and calculated its orbital period. Learning of this work from a copy of the Annual Report of the Henry Draper Memorial, Colonel John Herschel the Younger (son of eminent astronomer John Herschel) recognized the importance of her achievements by writing to Pickering, the observatory's director. Herschel asked Pickering "to convey to Miss Maury my congratulations on having connected her name with one of the most notable advances in physical astronomy ever made."

However, when the first spectroscopic binary and its orbit were more widely reported, the name connected with it was Pickering. The discovery was announced by Pickering in a presentation to the Philadelphia meeting of the National Academy of Sciences on November 13, 1889. The work was described in a paper "On the Spectrum of Zeta Ursae Majoris", which appeared in the American Journal of Science in 1890. In both cases the only mention of Maury was a single line, stating that "a careful study of the results has been made by Miss. A. C. Maury, a niece of Dr. Draper". The sole author credit was given as Pickering.

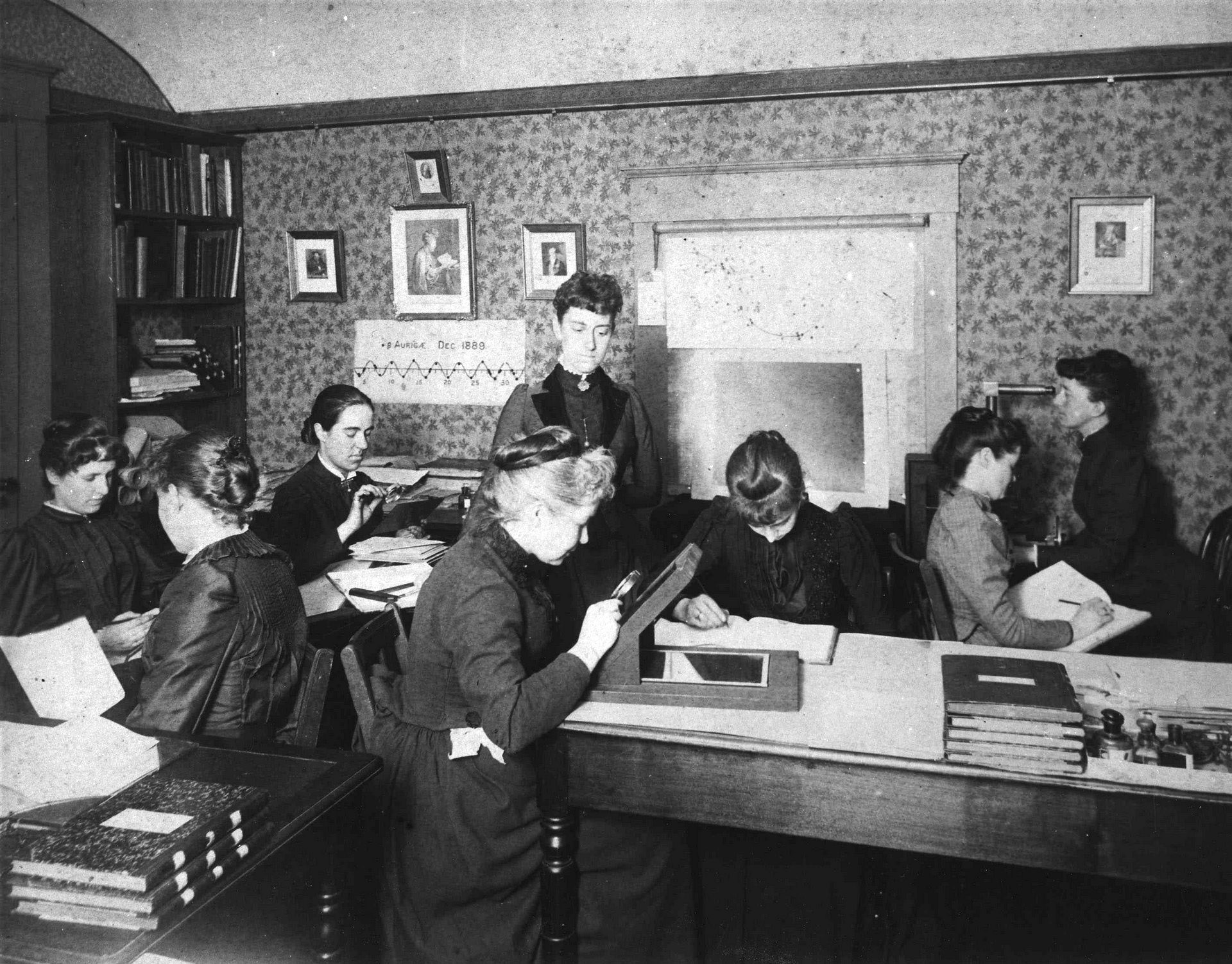
Harvard Computers at work, including Henrietta Swan Leavitt (1868–1921), Annie Jump Cannon (1863–1941), Williamina Fleming (1857–1911), and Antonia Maury (1866–1952).

In 1888, Maury was assigned to observe stellar spectra of bright stars in the northern celestial hemisphere and catalog them. Her work contributed to the construction of the Henry Draper Catalogue. By 1924, the catalogue would contain 225,300 stellar spectra, described in terms of their characteristics. By 2017, it would have 359,083 entries.

The Harvard Observatory staff used an alphabetical system of classification designed by Williamina P. Fleming and Annie Jump Cannon. Maury found their classification system inadequate and developed her own. It was considerably more detailed and included information about temperature and about the width, distinctness, and intensity of spectral lines.

In 1891 Maury left the observatory and started teaching in the Gilman School in Cambridge, Massachusetts. Pickering asked her to return and complete her observations, and she said that she was uncomfortable completing her research if her work was unacknowledged.

I do not think it is fair that I should pass the work into other hands until it can stand as work done by me. I worked out the theory at the cost of much thought and elaborate comparison and I think that I should have full credit for my theory of the relations of the star spectra and also for my theories in regard to Beta Lyrae.

She returned in 1893 and 1895 and published her observations of stellar spectra in an important catalogue of classifications in 1897. Spectra of Bright Stars Photographed With the 11-Inch Draper Telescope As Part of the Henry Draper Memorial and Discussed by Antonia C. Maury Under the Direction of Edward Charles Pickering (1897) presented the results of Maury's examination of 4,800 stellar photographs, using her own system of classification, and analyzed 681 bright northern stars in detail. It was the first observatory publication to have a woman's name in the title.

Pickering and others at the observatory disagreed with Maury's system of classification and explanation of differing line widths, and refused to use it. It was partly in response to this negative reaction to her work that she decided to leave the observatory. However, by 1908 Danish astronomer Ejnar Hertzsprung had realized the value of her classifications and used them in his system of identifying very bright red giant stars from faint dwarf stars. Hertzsprung wrote to Pickering:

In my opinion the separation by Antonia Maury of the c-and ac stars is the most important advancement in stellar classification since the trials by Vogel and Secchi ... To neglect the c-properties in solar spectra, I think, is nearly the same thing as if the zoologist, who had detected the deciding differences between a whale and a fish, would continue in classifying them together.

— Ejnar Hertzsprung

In 1922, the International Astronomical Union (IAU) modified its classification system based on the work done by Maury and Hertzsprung, a formulation known as the Hertzsprung–Russell diagram. Astronomer Dorrit Hoffleit has presented scientific evidence to support the view that stellar morphology was held back by 30 years as a result of the failure to adopt Antonia Maury's stellar classification theory sooner.

Between 1896 and 1918 Maury taught physics and chemistry at the Castle School (Miss C.E. Mason's Suburban School for Girls) in Tarrytown, New York. She also gave lectures on astronomy at Cornell University.

In 1918, Maury returned to Harvard College Observatory as an adjunct professor. With Pickering's successor Harlow Shapley she was given credit for her work, which was published under her own name. She stayed in the observatory until her retirement in 1948. Her work summarizing many years of research on the spectroscopic analysis of the binary star Beta Lyrae was published in 1933.

== Awards ==
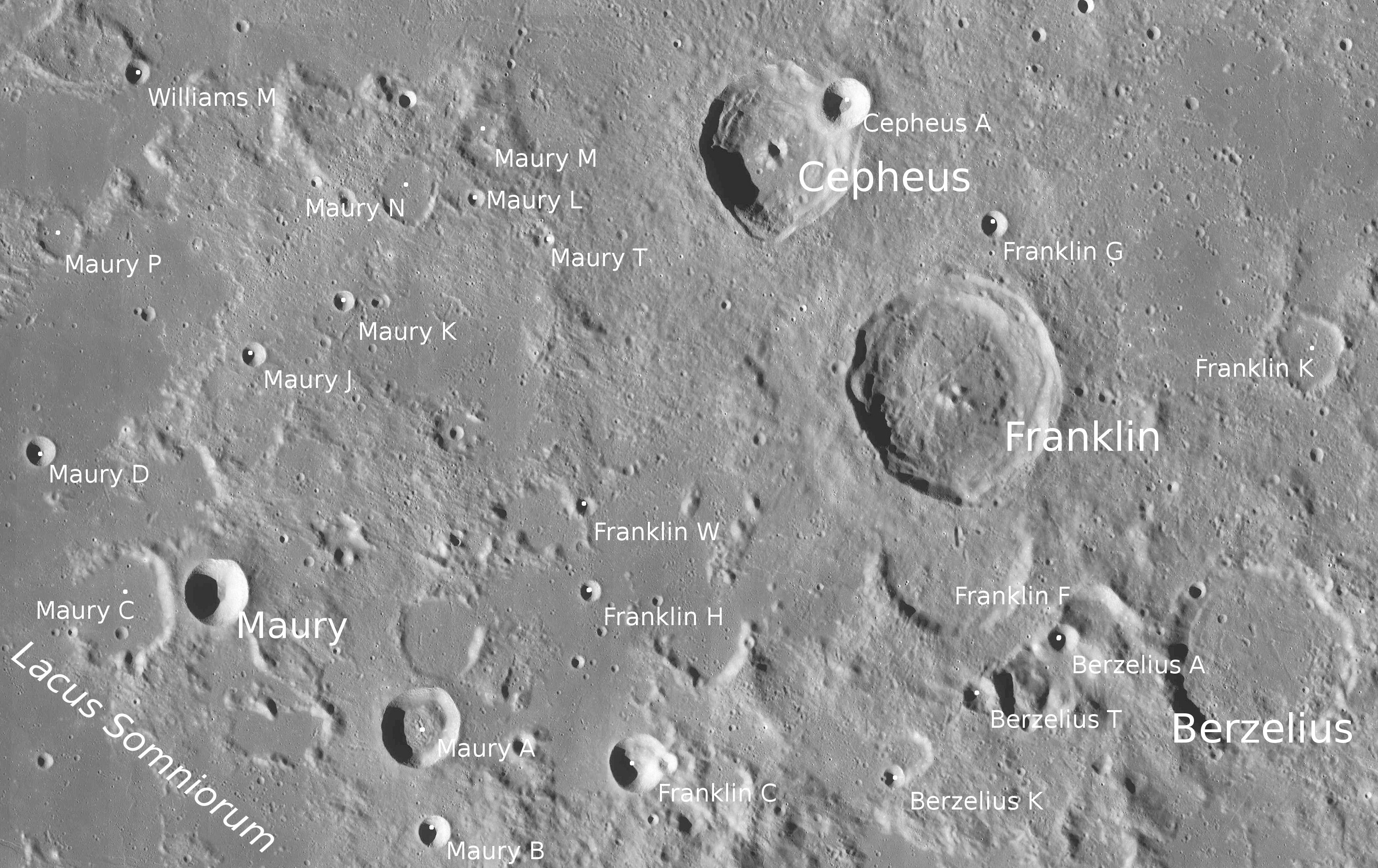
Maury lunar crater

Antonia Maury was a member of the American Astronomical Society and the Royal Astronomical Society. In 1943, she was awarded the Annie Jump Cannon Award in Astronomy by the American Astronomical Society.

The lunar crater Maury and a number of smaller ejecta craters are co-named for Antonia Maury. They were originally named for her cousin, Commander Matthew Fontaine Maury, United States and later Confederate navies, and are, perhaps, the only lunar features shared by two cousins.

In 1978, the Revised MK Spectral Atlas for Stars Earlier Than the Sun honored "Antonia C. Maury, Master Morphologist of Stellar Spectra" in its dedication.

== Later years ==
After retirement, Maury pursued interests in nature and conservation. She belonged to the National Audubon Society and enjoyed birdwatching. She fought to save western Sequoia trees from being felled during wartime.

For three years, Maury also served as curator of the John William Draper House in Hastings-on-Hudson, New York, where her grandfather and uncle had built observatories, and where the first photos of the moon as seen through a telescope were taken.

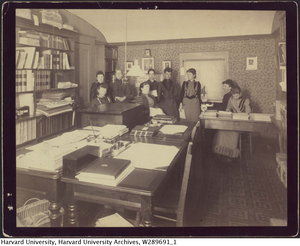
A photo of the group of "Computers" sitting in one of the rooms located in the Harvard College Observatory. The Astronomers, Antonia Maury, Anna Palmer Draper, and Williamina Fleming are notable figures with the other majority being unknown or unconfirmed.

Maury died on January 8, 1952, in Dobbs Ferry, New York.
