= Mauri Repo =

Finnish sports coach (1945–2002)

Mauri Repo (31 January 1945 – 19 May 2002) was the head coach of the Finnish Workers' Sports Federation (Suomen Työväen Urheiluliitto, TUL) during 1981–1987. By profession he was a physical education teacher and for some time worked in the Jyväskylä city administration as director of the sports department. He is the first known person to write about Nordic walking and considered its author.

== Mauri Repo and Nordic walking ==
Mauri Repo played an important as both a TUL coach and a coach trainer. Also, he was indispensable in the creation of many training and educational materials concerning skiing.

In Repo's skisport handbooks „Hiihdon lajiosa“ (1974), „Hiihdon lajiosa” (1979), „Nuorten hiihdon valmennusopas” (1983) ja „Hiihdon 2-tason koulutusmateriaali” (1989) is the first known introduction of Nordic walking (along with Nordic walking exercises and its importance in the summertime preparation of skiers). At the time of publishing Nordic walking had not yet gained recognition as a standalone sport. Repo is the author of nearly ten sport handbooks.
