= Mori clan =

Mori may refer to:

- The Mōri clan of the Aki and Nagato provinces
- The Mori clan (Genji) of Genji (Minamoto) descent, another daimyō family
- Mori Rajputs of India
