= Mory Correa =

French basketball player (born 1979)

Mory Correa (born July 21, 1979, in Versailles) is a French basketball player who played for French Pro-A league clubs Châlons-en-Champagne and Besançon during the 2004–2007 seasons.
