= Naoki Mori =

Naoki Mori may refer to:

- Naoki Mori (footballer, born 1972) (森 直樹), Japanese footballer
- Naoki Mori (footballer, born 1977) (森 直樹), Japanese footballer
- Naoki Mori (virologist) (森 直樹), Japanese virologist
