= Robert Maury =

American serial killer on death row

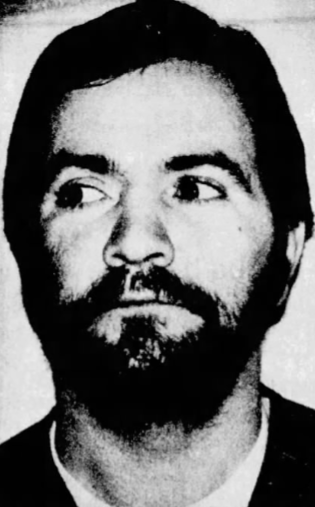
- Maury in c. 1987
- Born: Robert Edward Maury; February 24, 1958 (age 68); Crescent City, California, U.S.
- Other name: The Tipster Killer
- Occupation: Landscaper
- Convictions: First degree murder with special circumstances (3 counts); Assault with intent to commit rape Robbery; Rape
- Penalty: Death

Details
- Victims: 3–5+
- Span of crimes: 1985–1987
- Country: United States
- State: California
- Date apprehended: November 7, 1987
- Imprisoned at: San Quentin State Prison

Robert Edward Maury (born February 24, 1958), known as the Tipster Killer, is an American serial killer who strangled three women to death in Shasta County, California, from 1985 to 1987. After each murder, Maury anonymously called into a tip line to tell detectives crucial information, including where the bodies were located, to confuse them and sometimes gain reward money. Suspected in two additional murders, Maury was sentenced to death for his known crimes and is currently awaiting execution.

== Early life ==
Maury was born in Crescent City, California, in 1958. His family moved to Anderson shortly after his birth, and it has been alleged that he had an abusive father growing up. After graduating high school, Maury enlisted in the Army, but was dishonorably discharged in 1985 for marijuana possession. Afterwards, he moved to Cottonwood and occasionally worked as a landscaper and a dried-flower arranger.

== Murders ==
=== Averill D. Weeden ===
In late May 1985, Maury's landlord, 48-year-old Averill Deanna Weeden, suddenly went missing. In the initial investigation, police interviewed Maury, who denied any involvement in her disappearance. On June 19, an anonymous man called the Secret Witness Program of Shasta County claiming to have information leading to Weeden's whereabouts, but inquired to know how much he would receive in compensation. On August 8, the man again called and claimed to have found Weeden's body, but would only lead investigators to it if he received reward money. After an exchange over the phone, Shirley Landreth, who answered most of the incoming calls for the Secret Witness, agreed to the caller's proposal, and he gave precise directions to a wooded area along Bechelli Lane near South Bonnyview Road in Redding.

Later that day, investigators were dispatched to the area and found Weedon's body, partially buried and wrapped in cardboard. An autopsy on August 23 revealed she retained several skull fractures and a bone was fractured in her throat, indicating she had been strangled. After the discovery of her body, the Secret Witness Program received several more calls from the anonymous man, who claimed at one point the killer was named Robert or Bob. The man also claimed during a separate call that Weeden was picked up at dusk and killed with a six- to eight-inch rock on May 23. Maury was interviewed by investigators again on September 4, and he again denied involvement. On September 11, 1986, over one year after Weeden's murder, the same anonymous man called the Secret Witness Program to report a burglary, while simultaneously asking for immunity in the Weeden murder investigation.

=== Belinda Jo Stark ===
On June 29, 1987, 30-year-old Belinda Jo Stark was due to attend a court hearing in Nevada City for a traffic violation but failed to attend that day. She had last been seen by her boyfriend, Gary Evans, on June 25, who did not initially report her missing based on her habits of "coming and going". But on August 8, an anonymous man called the Secret Witness Program claiming to have found a body but would only reveal the location if he were to receive a certain amount in reward money. Nine days later, the man made several more calls to Secret Witness, claiming the body was of a woman named Gretchen Olston, and that she had been killed over a month prior. He gave specific directions to investigators, and they were dispatched to the location, which was a remote, bushy grassland near Palm Avenue and Monte Vista Road. There, the body of the woman was discovered, and although she was not immediately identified, it was later revealed to have been Stark, identified by the numerous tattoos on her body.

=== Dawn M. Berryhill ===
On September 22, 1987, the body of 20-year-old Dawn Marie Berryhill was found in a remote bushy area approximately 250 yards from where Stark was found. She had last been seen on June 22 when she left her 6-month-old son with a friend. Due to the level of decomposition on the body, she had to be identified through dental records. An autopsy showed Berryhill had been strangled to death with a bootlace. Her body was found due to an anonymous caller tipping off the police. Police speculated that the killings of Berryhill and Stark could have been connected due to the proximity they were found and the fact both had disappeared days apart.

=== Suspected victims ===
On August 4, 1983, the nude body of Lora Stewart, 44, was found in Battle Creek near Cottonwood. She had been strangled to death. She was a waitress at Jerry's Restaurant on Cypress Avenue in Redding. Maury has been considered a possible suspect in her murder but never charged.

On October 5, 1983, the body of Redding businesswoman Helen Faye Generes, 63, was found on the floor of her Market Street real estate office, in Redding. She too had been strangled to death.

In later years, Maury requested that some of his property be returned to his family so they could sell it off. However, officials would deny all requests and said that his property could have held evidence of other victims. So far, he has not been definitively linked to any other crimes.

== Arrest ==
Maury was investigated as a suspect in September 1987 after it was suspected he had been the caller in the three murder cases and had received $2,000 in return. It was found that Maury had bought a motorcycle with the money and paid off some of his family's debts. Fire Marshall Roy Del Carlo, who was wired, posed as the chairman of the Secret Witness board and met with Maury in a series of meetings. His voice was compared to the caller who had called to report the bodies, and they were found to have been eerily similar. Maury's fingerprints also matched a fingerprint left on an envelope that contained Secret Witness reward money. More evidence emerged that physically linked Maury to Stark's murder, as a fingerprint found inside her purse matched Maury's prints.

Maury was arrested at his home on November 7, 1987, under suspicion of committing the murders. Maury was held at $750,000 bail awaiting charges, which was later changed to no bail once he was charged with three counts of first-degree murder and was additionally charged with raping a woman in August. Maury pleaded innocent and said he merely witnessed one of the killings. He also said revealing his identity violated his rights.

== Trial and later life ==
The defense argued during the trial that Maury accidentally discovered the bodies and reported them as a good Samaritan. A jury found him guilty of all three murders, and Maury told them to sentence him to death if they truly thought he was guilty, to which they did.

In 2003, Maury attempted to appeal his sentence because multiple errors occurred during the trial, including the fact the jury had been told about his calls to the hotline, something that the Secret Witness Program, which had promised to keep his identity private, violated his 4th amendment rights. The court stated however that the program is allowed to pass on the information to law enforcement who are involved in an investigation, and so, the appeal was rejected, and he remained on death row.

Capital punishment in California remains in a state of limbo following multiple ballot initiatives and a moratorium imposed by Governor Gavin Newsom, and executions have not been fulfilled in California since 2006. As of 2023, Maury was still awaiting execution at San Quentin State Prison in San Quentin, California.

== See also ==
- List of death row inmates in the United States
- List of serial killers in the United States
