= Morrey =

Morrey is a surname. Notable people with the name include:

- Bernard Morrey (1927-2011), English footballer
- Charles B. Morrey, Jr. (1907-1984), American mathematician
- Humphrey Morrey (c. 1650-1716), first mayor of Philadelphia
- Marion Morrey Richter (1900-1996), American composer and pianist
- Stephen Morrey (1880–1921), Saskatchewan farmer and politician

== See also ==
- Moray, a council area in Scotland
  - Moray (disambiguation)
- Morey (disambiguation), includes a list of people with surname Morey
- Moorey, a surname
