= Carlotta Maury =

American paleontologist and geologist (1874–1938)

Carlotta Joaquina Maury
- Maury, from a 1915 newspaper
- Born: January 6, 1874; Hastings-on-Hudson, New York
- Died: January 3, 1938 (aged 63); Yonkers, New York
- Resting place: Cold Springs. New York
- Known for: Geologist, stratigrapher, palaeontologist
- Scientific career
- Fields: Oil and Gas Industry
- Workplaces: PhD at Cornell University

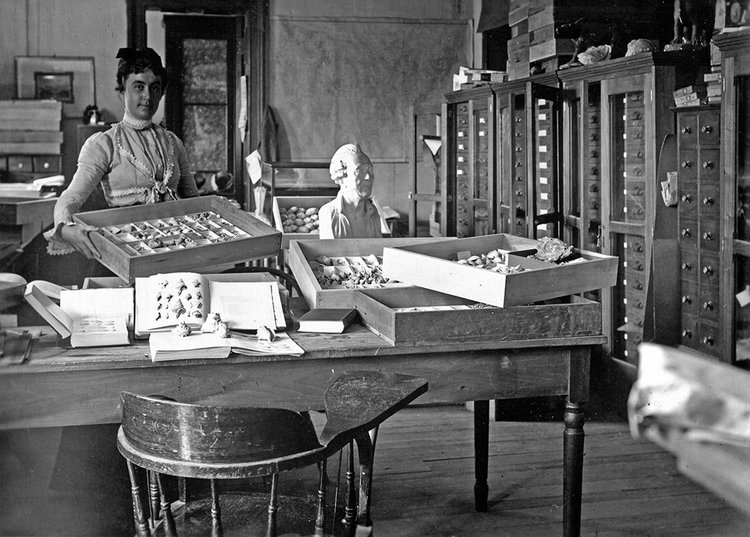
Carlotta Maury in a Paleontology Laboratory, at Cornell University 1902.

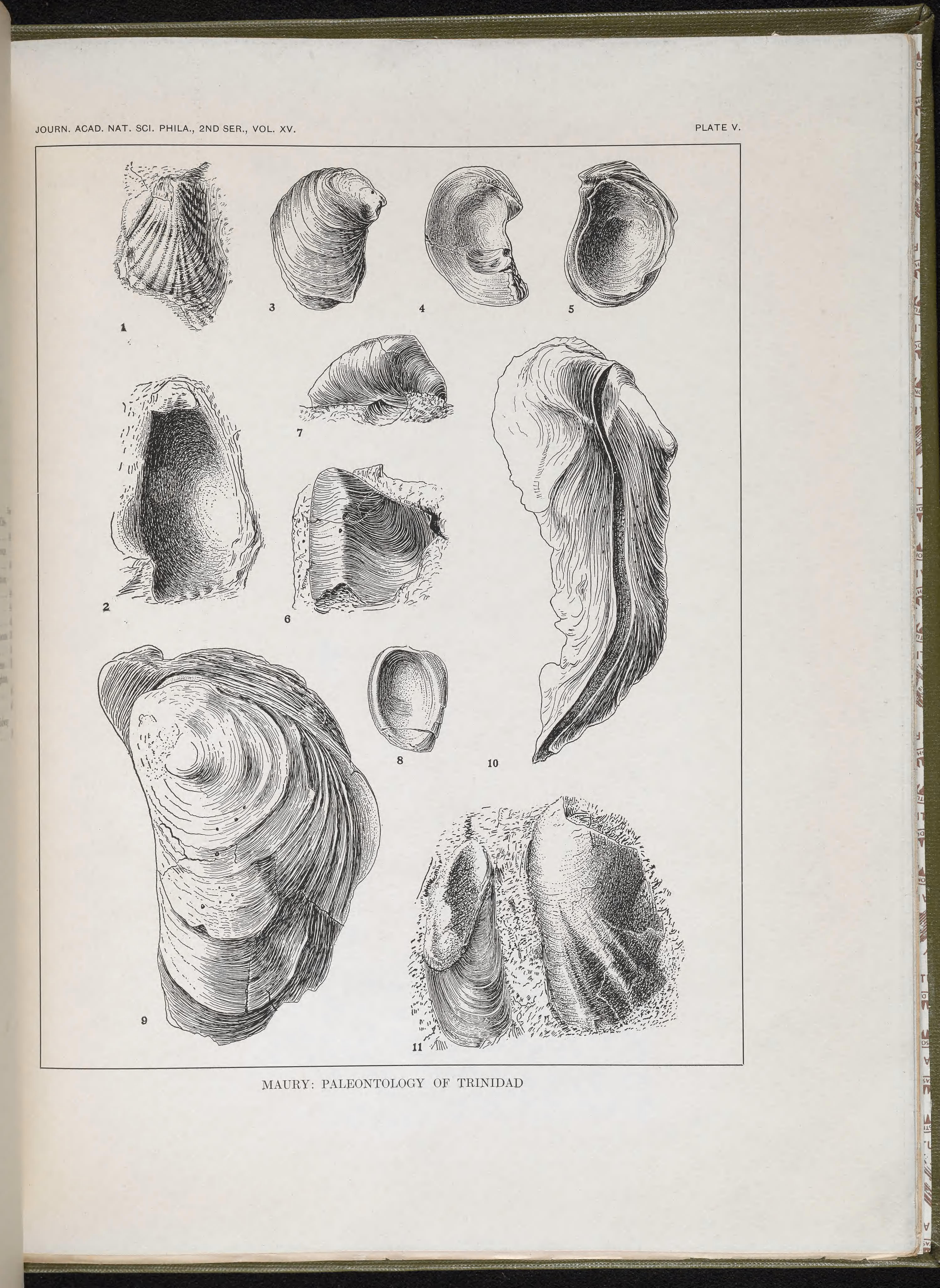
Fossils that were found by Carlotta Maury, areas of Old Eocene beds in Trinidad.

Carlotta Joaquina Maury (January 6, 1874 – January 3, 1938) was a geologist, stratigrapher and paleontologist, specialising in Tertiary mollusks. She was one of the first women to work as a professional scientist in the oil and gas industry, consulting as a palaeontologist and as a petroleum geologist at Royal Dutch Shell in 1910 and later General Asphalt Co.

== Early life ==
Carlotta Joaquina Maury was born on January 6, 1874, in Hastings-on-Hudson, New York. Her father was the Reverend Mytton Maury, son of Sarah Mytton Maury and a direct descendant of the Reverend James Maury. Maury's mother was Virginia Draper, a daughter of Antonia Coetana de Paiva Pereira Gardner and Dr. John William Draper. The latter, with his son Henry Draper, were pioneering astronomers who privately funded the Harvard Observatory. Her other maternal grandfather, Daniel Gardner, was physician to Carlota Joaquina of Spain and her husband John VI of Portugal, titular Emperor of Brazil.

Her sister, Antonia Maury became an astronomer, and worked as a scientist and a mathematician in the Harvard Observatory. Another sister, Sarah Mytton Maury died in early childhood. Her brother John William Draper became an established surgeon in New York. Maury and her siblings were the sixth generation of the Maury family to live in the United States.

Early in her life, Maury's parents instilled in her a love for nature by exposing her to the wonders of the natural world.

== Education ==
From 1891 to 1894, Maury attended Radcliffe College. One of the founding members of Radcliffe College and the first president, Elizabeth Agassiz, played a key role in Maury's education. Maury received the Schulyer Fellowship and the Sarah Berliner Research Fellowship while attending Cornell University. She later studied at the Jardin des Plantes in Paris from 1899 to 1900 and at Columbia University. After spending a year at the Sorbonne for post-graduate studies, in 1902, Maury completed her PhD in paleontology at Cornell University. Gilbert Dennison Harris was Maury's mentor throughout her palaeontology education career.

== Career ==
Upon completion of her degree, Maury started teaching at Erasmus High School in Brooklyn, New York in 1900. She went on to become a paleontologist assistant at Columbia University in 1904 and a lecturer in geology at Columbia College and Barnard College until 1912.

Maury returned to the field and joined a team led by G. D. Harris, her former Cornell advisor. The team's objective was to investigate oil-rich areas off the coasts of Texas and Louisiana in the Gulf of Mexico. The information provided was the first significant geological information about what is now a significant oil-producing area. Maury's specific contribution to the team's research efforts was assembling data based on paleontologist findings in order to create a structure map of a large region. The team's analysis has only needed minor adjustments since it was published in 1910.

In 1910, Maury started working for Royal Dutch Shell as a consulting geologist and stratigrapher - she became the first woman to be hired as a consultant. Maury later consulted for General Asphalt Co. as part of a team to explore areas of Old Eocene beds in Trinidad and Venezuela. Her findings of fossils and fauna were the first of their kind in the Caribbean and South America. From 1910 to 1911 Maury had the opportunity to be a part of Arthur Clifford Veatch's geological expedition to Venezuela as a paleontologist.

After teaching at Huguenot College in Wellington, South Africa, Maury returned to the Caribbean in 1916 as a leader of the "Maury Expedition" to the Dominican Republic, although there was political instability in the area at the time. Her goal was to order the stratigraphic layers of the Miocene and Oligocene eras, which were composed of sedimentary rock with heavy fossil deposits. The expedition resulted in the discovery of 400 new species. Her work formed the foundation of the present day International Dominican Republic Project, a research programme that aims to dissect evolutionary change in the Caribbean from the Miocene era to the present day. In 1925 Maury published "Fosseis Terciarios do Brasil com Descripção de Novas Formas Cretaceas", in which she described a species of mollusks from the northeastern coast of South America. A majority of the mollusks listed were new species. Using her stratigraphical knowledge, she was able to find a correlation of those faunas with similar faunas around the Caribbean and the Gulf of Mexico. The monograph detailed fossils from the geological epoch of the Lower Miocene that were found in Rio Pirabas and Bragança to Belém. In both these areas the fossils were located in beds of limestone, and the fossils were primarily internal and external shell casts within the rock.

Maury had a talent for writing and documented her expeditions effectively. She was known by her colleagues for her energy and efficiency, even as she experienced prejudice against women scientists. She became an official paleontologist with the Geological and Mineralogical Service of Brazil, and in this position, published multiple monographs and Mineralogical Service Bulletins between 1919 and 1937. She was a fellow of the American Geographical Society. Her last report before she died was published in 1937, on the Pliocene fossils of Acre, Brazil.

Most of her work after 1923 was completed inside a private lab in her apartment in Yonkers, New York. As she was financially independent, she was able to hire other specialists on the work she was less confident in.

== Death ==
Maury died January 3, 1938, in Yonkers, New York. She was buried at Cold Springs, New York on January 6 - her 64th birthday.
