= Mury (disambiguation) =

Mury ("The Walls") was a Polish female anti-Nazi resistance group. Mury may also refer to:

- "Mury" (song), 1978 Polish protest song
- Saint-Mury-Monteymond, commune in Isère, France

== See also ==
- Murie (disambiguation)
- Murry (disambiguation)
