= Mouri =

Mouri may refer to:

- Mahiari or Mouri, a census town under Domjur police station in Sadar subdivision of Howrah district in the Indian state of West Bengal
- Moree, Ghana, formerly Mouri, a village in the central region of south Ghana
- Mowri, also Romanized as Mouri or Moori, a subgroup of the Bakhtiari people in Iran
- In Japanese, the name Mōri can also be Romanised as Mori (disambiguation) or Mouri.
  - Mōri, a Japanese samurai clan
