= François Mingaud =

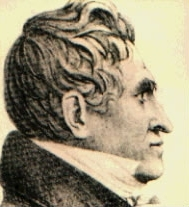
- François Mingaud as portrayed in Vienna's Weingartner Museum of Billiards
- Born: François Mingaud; January 4, 1771; Le Cailar, Languedoc, Kingdom of France
- Died: December 23, 1847 (aged 76); Rotterdam
- Resting place: churchyard at Kralingen-Crooswijk
- Occupations: Infantry Captain, Billiards player
- Known for: Inventing the leather tip for a billiards cue

Captain François Mingaud (sometimes spelled Mingot, Mengaud or Minguad, and often referred to simply as M. Mingaud; 4 January 1771 – 23 December 1847) was an infantry officer in the French Army and a carom billiards player. He is credited as the inventor of the leather tip for a billiards cue, a "possibly not original idea" that he perfected while imprisoned in Bicêtre (now Bicêtre Hospital) for political outspokenness. This revolutionized the game of billiards, allowing the cue ball to be finely manipulated by the application of spin.

In 1807 he was released from prison and began to demonstrate his invention and spin technique in Paris. Part of his showmanship involved feigning extreme horror as the cue ball recoiled towards him after striking the object ball, and then persuading the audience that the balls should be seized and condemned because they were "tormented by a devil". Mingaud is also credited with the discovery that by raising the cue vertically he could perform what is now known as a massé shot.

== Personal life ==
Mingaud was born in 1771 in Le Cailar near Nîmes in the Département of the Gard in France. He joined the army under Napoleon and served as a captain.

After his release from prison in Paris during 1807 he toured France and Europe demonstrating his 'trick shot' prowess.

In 1822 Mingaud settled on the Hoogstraat in Rotterdam and by 1835, when he was 64, he had remarried.

== Billiards ==
French archives show Mingaud was arrested in the Netherlands for "involvement in the conspiracy of Cadoudal," (referring to Georges Cadoudal) and labeled an "adventurer whose presence in society can only be dangerous." He was imprisoned in Bicêtre, a men's prison in Paris which is now the site of Bicêtre Hospital. (Many internet sources incorrectly report the Bastille as the site of Mingaud's imprisonment, but this is impossible. The Bastille was destroyed in 1789 during the French Revolution prior to Mingaud's incarceration.)

In prison, Mingaud had access to a billiard-table and so studied the game of billiards. In this age of simple wooden cues, others had experimented with leather tips, but it was Mingaud who perfected both the design and the appropriate playing technique. In or about 1790 a new practice of rounding off the entire tip further decreased slippage. Some publications credit Mingaud with not just the invention of the leather cue tip but with the practice of rounding off a cue's terminus, while other publications ascribe the practice to no particular author. Regardless, application of spin remained a hit or miss affair, with no fine control yet possible, and miscues still "unavoidable where hard wood came in contact with slippery ivory." Application of sidespin or "twist" (sometimes called "English", especially in North America) was at the time an unknown artform.

=== Impact on the game ===
In 1807, Mingaud was released from Bicêtre. Mingaud then began to demonstrate his invention and technique in the cafés of Paris. He reportedly developed a repertoire of 40 shots, including glancing blows, side-spin, backspin, topspin and the raised cue 'massé' shots. The patrons of the cafes were astonished by the displays of control and manipulation of the cue ball that they had never seen nor imagined possible. In a short time Mingaud's cue tip innovation became the norm and rapid improvements in the game followed in its wake. In 1823 cue tips from Europe were introduced into the United States, but as their fame had long since preceded them, some of domestic make were already in use. (Note: Further development of the leather cue tip - 'Hénine Ainé' was founded in 1830 and improved Mingaud's invention by creating the 'screw-in tip', making tip replacement a much easier affair.) Soon after the introduction of cue tips in France Carom billiards, requiring heavy manipulation of spin, became popular and the scoring by way of "hazards" or pockets was gradually abolished.

How astonished were the billiard players and the billiard table manufacturers of Mingaud's day, by the results of his invention! ... When the independent amateurs of Paris saw the practical operation of Mingaud's discovery—when they saw the ordinary laws of motion apparently reversed in obedience to the whim of the person wielding the (then modern) cue—when they saw him, with a perfect mastery of his own ball, sometimes force it to describe a curve around a hat placed in the middle of the board—sometimes compel it to make angles diametrically opposed to the ordinary laws as hitherto expounded and believed—when they saw the same ball apparently possessing scarce enough force to arrive at a cushion, suddenly gather strength at the moment of impact, and fly off with increasing velocity. When they saw these things, we say, it seemed to them like magic, and it was lucky for Mingaud that the statutes against sorcery had been repealed before his day.

— Michael Phelan (the "Father of American Billiards") (1859)

=== Reputation ===
Mingaud's reputation grew rapidly and he became known as the 'great master of the game'. According to Roberts on Billiards published in 1893 by John Roberts :

A few years later [after 1807] he became known as the great master of the game. He could nurse a break, screw, and cause his ball to follow with the utmost nicety and certainty.

Mingaud quietly advanced, took up [the cue] and struck the white ball, which, after contact with the red, recoiled upon him. Affecting extreme horror, he dropped the cue, and summoned the waiter, to whom he explained that when he had pushed a ball forward it ran backwards. The spectators were incredulous, and, in reply to their entreaties, Mingaud attempted another stroke, but with the same result. The balls were seized and condemned as "tormented by a devil",

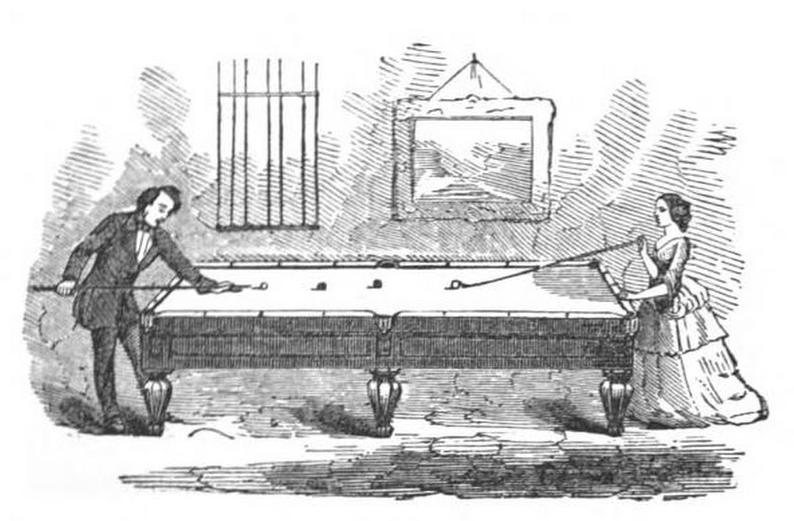
Man playing billiards with a cue and a woman with a mace, from an illustration appearing in Michael Phelan's 1859 book, The Game of Billiards.

=== Invention of the Massé shot ===
Mingaud is also credited with the discovery that by raising the cue vertically, to the position adopted by the mace (The forerunner of the cue, similar to a light-weight golf club, with a square-fronted foot that was generally used to shove rather than strike the cue ball.), he could perform what is now known as a massé shot.

== Book - Noble Jeu de Billard ==
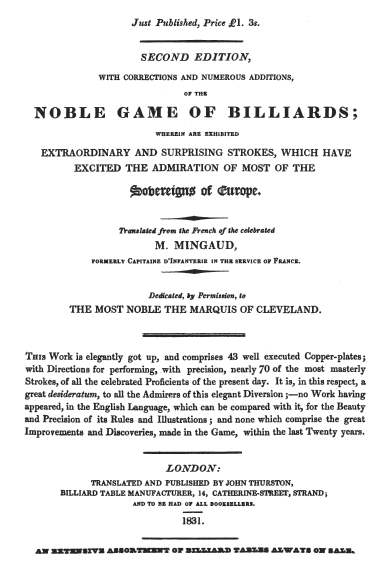
Credit page from The Noble Game of Billiards, John Thurston's 1831 second edition translation of M. Mingaud's 1827 French treatise, Noble Jeu de Billard

In 1827, Mingaud published a book in Paris titled Noble Jeu de Billiard - Coups extraordinaires et surprenans. (The Noble Game of Billiards. Extraordinary and surprising strokes) It contained 43 copper-plate images and precise instructions for performing 70 strokes.

Circa 1830, this book was translated and published in English by the Billiards table Manufacturer John Thurston of 14 Catherine Street, The Strand. It was published in English as :

The Noble Game of Billiards
Extraordinary and surprising strokes which have excited the admiration of most of the Sovereigns of Europe.

Robert Byrne's 1982 book Byrne's Treasury of Trick Shots in Pool and Billiards indicated only two copies of the original work were known to exist in the USA: one in the Library of Congress, and one at University of Notre Dame. However, a digitized version of the 1831 second edition of Thurston's translation is now freely available.

== Death and commemoration ==
He died in 1847 and his grave is in the churchyard at Kralingen-Crooswijk, a suburb of Rotterdam.

In Spanish, "Mingo" is slang for the red ball used in carom billiards. It is named after Mingaud.

In the 1990s, Cees Sprangers, Dongen, The Netherlands, began to research the 'lost mystery' that Mingaud had become. His results were for a first time published in the Dutch monthly magazine 'Biljart' in May 1991 and November 1992, later on in essay form in 1994 in Victor Stein and Paul Rubino's Billiard Encyclopedia. He revealed many details of Mingaud's life, including his first name, fleshed out his personal history, and to a large extent, clarified the details on his role in the invention of the leather cue tip.
