= Parris Cues =

British company

- Industry: Sports equipment
- Founded: London, UK (1984)
- Founder: John Parris
- Headquarters: London, UK
- Products: Snooker & Pool Cues, Cases & Accessories
- Website: parriscues.com

Parris Cues are a snooker cue maker headquartered in London. Founded in 1984, the company was started by John Parris.

Parris Cues' products are produced at the company's Forest Hill, London, UK workshop. The company sells its cues worldwide. A major cue repair was performed by the company in 1987, when Steve Davis's cue snapped at the ferrule while he was playing in the Rothman's Grand Prix. The repair was completed by extending the butt by the same length lost from the tip to maintain the cue's balance and playability, which required sawing Davis's cue in two.

Parris Cues have been used by professional players, including Ronnie O'Sullivan, Jimmy White, Steve Davis, Stephen Hendry, Stephen Maguire, John Higgins and Neil Robertson.

== See also ==
- List of sporting goods manufacturers
