= George Bertram Carter =

English architect (1896–1986)

George Bertram Carter (1 March 1896 – January 1986) was an English architect.

Carter attended Blackheath School of Art between 1911 and 1915 and then the Royal College of Art under William Lethaby and Arthur Beresford Pite between 1915 and 1917. He was a pupil in the office of Edwin Lutyens between 1919 and 1922 and became Hon, Treasurer of the Modern Architectural Research Group, or MARS Group, in 1944.

== Career ==
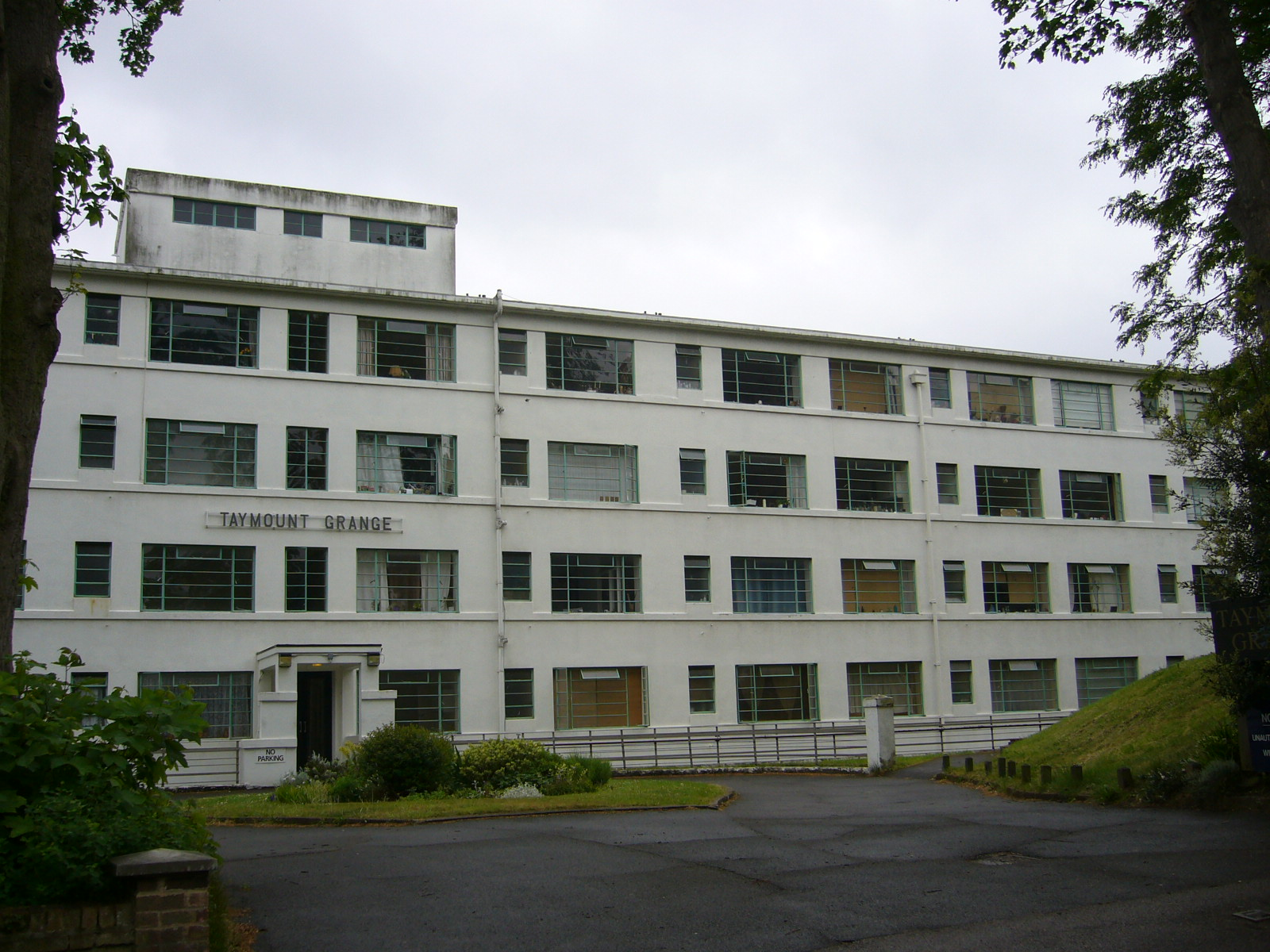
Taymount Grange

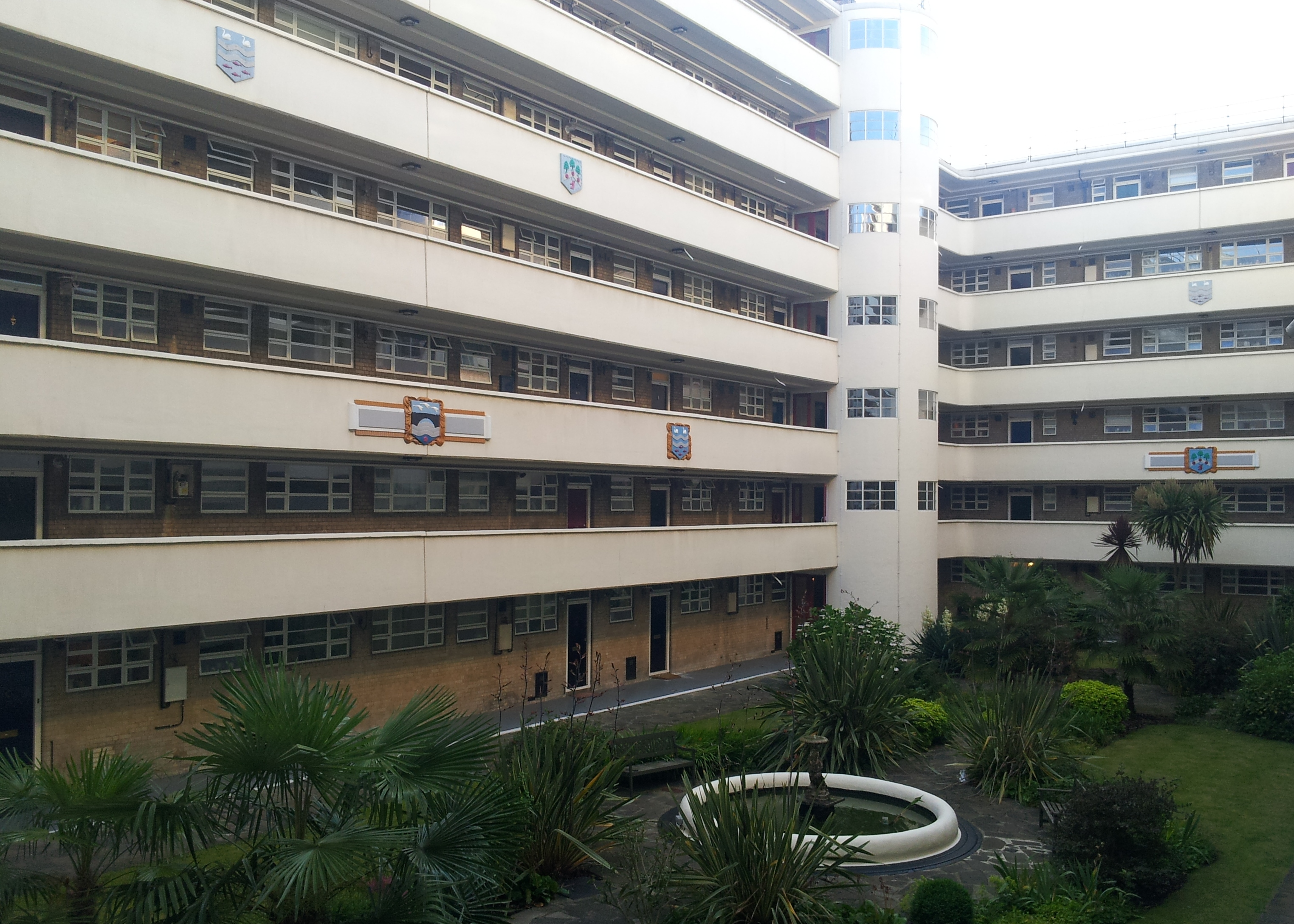
Courtyard of Lichfield Court

Carter set up in practice in Clifford's Inn, London in 1929.

His works include:

- A factory in Tottenham for B. E. White Esq.
- A factory in Whitechapel for Lessor Bros.
- Taymount Grange, Forest Hill, London (1935)
- Lichfield Court, Sheen Road, Richmond (1935); Grade II listed (Note: The Twentieth Century Society reported the listing of Lichfield Court, saying: Bertram Carter's building goes beyond the merely functional brief to create a dramatic courtyard environment with white bands of the galleries stepping forward to envelop the staircase towers. This highly stylised effect is truly unique and takes the building from being a quite standard apartment block of the era to a truly exciting new level. The courtyard walkways with their sculptural uniformity let the building transcend from the moderne to the modern. In this they are reminiscent of Wells Coates's Embassy Court in Brighton dating from 1934 to 1935 with its 'radical white bands of balconies and stair parapets' (see Pevsner: Sussex, p.74). This idea of the external walkway as access for high-rise buildings became very popular in post-war developments, and Litchfield Court can therefore be seen as an early forerunner of this design development. "Litchfield Court, Sheen Road, Richmond, Surrey; Bertram Carter, 1935, Grade II". Listings reports. Twentieth Century Society. Spring 2004. Archived from the original on 2 February 2014.)
- Pipenham Hall, Little Hallingbury, Essex
- The Nurses' Home, St John's Hospital, Lewisham (1938; demolished after the hospital site was sold in 1986 to be developed for housing}.
- Heal's (formerly Dunn's) Furniture Shop, Market Square, Bromley (1954–57)
