= Mayow =

Mayow may refer to:

- Mayow Park in Sydenham, London, England
- John Mayow (1641–1679), British chemist, physician, and physiologist
- William Mayow, 16th century major in Cornwall, England
