= John Parris =

British snooker cuemaker (born 1952)

Parris snooker cues

John Parris (born 1952) is an English manufacturer of snooker cues. Based in Forest Hill in London, England, Parris is one of the most renowned producers of cues. He opened his cue workshop in 1984.

A large number of professional players use John Parris' cues, including Ronnie O'Sullivan, Steve Davis, Tony Drago, Terry Griffiths, Dominic Dale and Stephen Maguire.

== See also ==
- Parris Cues
