= Lichfield Court =

Coordinates: 51°27′41″N 0°18′3″W

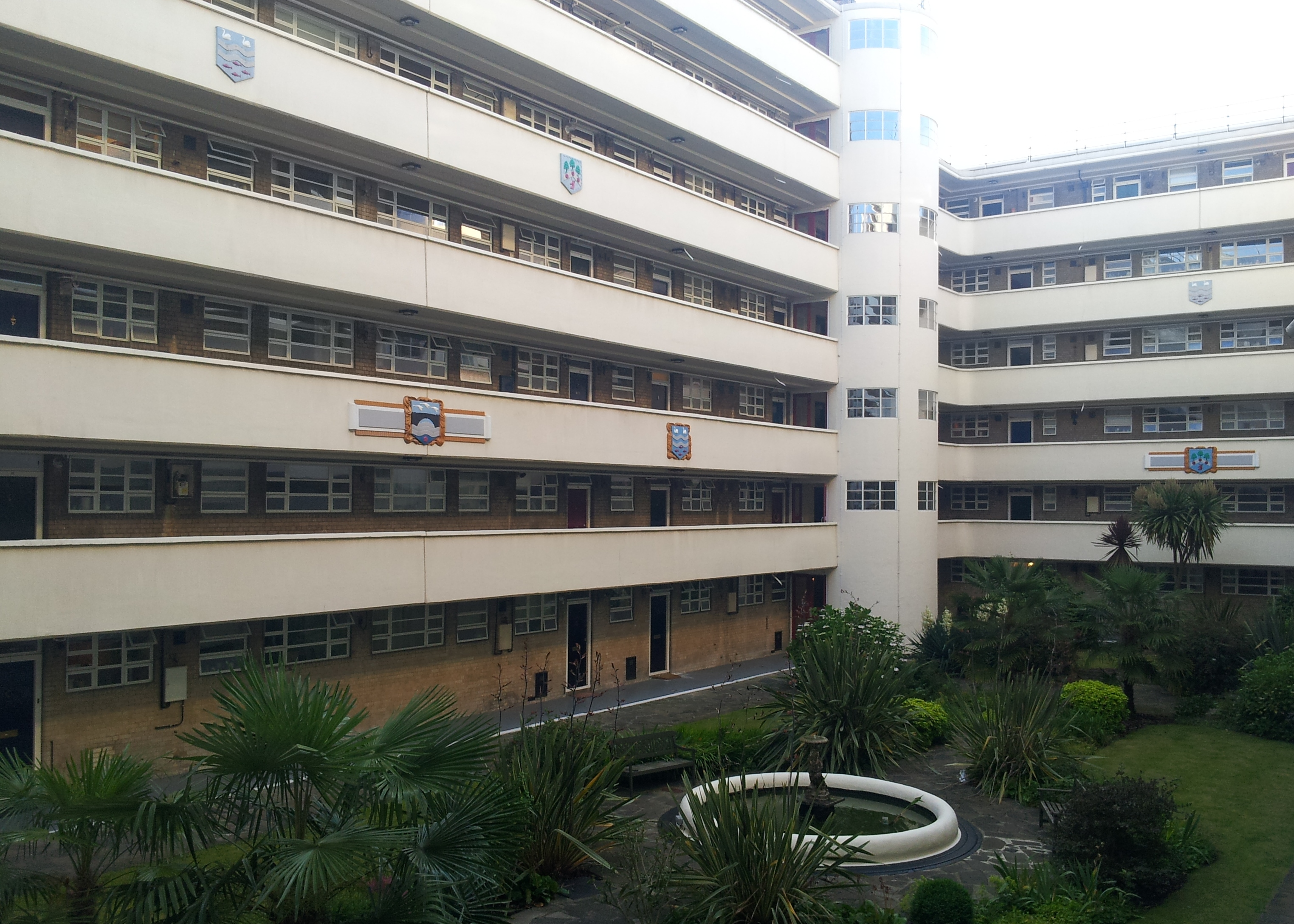
- Courtyard of Lichfield Court
- Interactive map of Lichfield Court
- Location: Sheen Road, Richmond, London TW9 1AU, England

History
- Built: 1935
- Built for: George Broadbridge

Site notes
- Architect: Bertram Carter
- Architectural style: Streamline Moderne

Listed Building – Grade II
- Official name: 1–211 Lichfield Court and 1–17 Lichfield Terrace
- Designated: 27 January 2004
- Reference no.: 1390787

Lichfield Court, on Sheen Road in Richmond, London, consists of two Grade II listed purpose-built blocks of flats. Designed by Bertram Carter and built in fine Streamline Moderne style, it was completed in 1935.

== Lichfield House ==
Lichfield Court is built on the site of Lichfield House, named when the London residence of the Bishop of Lichfield. Wealthy sugar factor Henry Lascelles (1690–1753) bought the house and died there by suicide. Novelist Mary Elizabeth Braddon (1837–1915), lived there from before 1874 until her death. The house was described in 1907 as a "grand old red brick building with a beautiful formal garden". Sir Henry George Norris was the final resident. The house and grounds were acquired in 1933 by George Broadbridge and redeveloped into the present two blocks of flats.

== Design ==
The company estate office and porters' office are situated in the main lobby of the major block. The buildings are surrounded by estate grounds which are a mix of gardens and unallocated parking, the major block having a decorative inner courtyard garden and pond. Initially intended for the rental market, the flats conformed to six different types ranging from studio flats with no alcove, to studio flats with one alcove or two alcoves, and one to three-bedroom flats, some with balconies.

== Listed status ==
The buildings were awarded Grade II listing in January 2004. The Twentieth Century Society reported the listing, saying:

Bertram Carter's building goes beyond the merely functional brief to create a dramatic courtyard environment with white bands of the galleries stepping forward to envelop the staircase towers. This highly stylised effect is truly unique and takes the building from being a quite standard apartment block of the era to a truly exciting new level. The courtyard walkways with their sculptural uniformity let the building transcend from the moderne to the modern. In this they are reminiscent of Wells Coates' Embassy Court in Brighton dating from 1934 to 1935 with its 'radical white bands of balconies and stair parapets' (see Pevsner: Sussex, p.74). This idea of the external walkway as access for high-rise buildings became very popular in post-war developments, and Litchfield Court can therefore be seen as an early forerunner of this design development.

== Popular culture ==
Lichfield Court was used as a filming location in the TV adaptation of Agatha Christie's novel One, Two, Buckle My Shoe.
