= Moori Kobo =

Japanese manufacturer

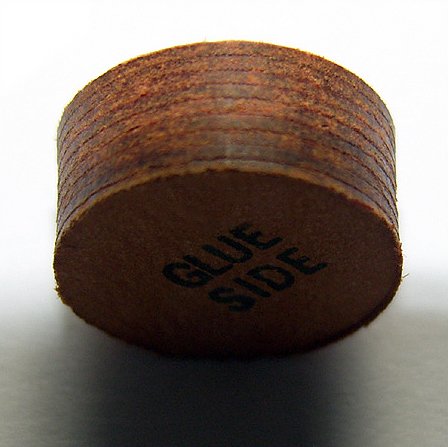
- Moori laminated tip
- Native name: 有限会社毛利工房
- Romanized name: Yūgen Kaisha Mōri Kōbō
- Company type: Originally yūgen gaisha, now gōdō gaisha
- Industry: Billiard equipment
- Founded: 1983
- Founder: Hideo Moori
- Headquarters: Setagaya-ku, Tokyo, Japan
- Key people: Hideo Moori
- Products: Billiard cue stick tips
- Website: mooribrand.com

Moori Kobo (有限会社毛利工房, Yūgen Kaisha Mōri Kōbō) is a Japanese manufacturer of billiards and pool cue tips. Originally fabricated by hand by founder Hideo Moori in his home outside Tokyo, they are now produced in a factory. The tips are exclusively made from vegetable-tanned pig skin, and consist of several laminated thin layers bonded with an adhesive.

Moori was among the first to use a lamination technique to make a cue tip. Moori tips received their first major exposure during the WPA World Nine-ball Championship in October 1994, and prompted many other companies to begin manufacturing layered tips.

Moori makes tips in three degrees of hardness: slow (soft), medium, and quick (hard).

== See also ==
- List of sporting goods manufacturers
