= Forest Croft and Taymount Grange =

Buildings in Forest Hill, London, England

Coordinates: 51.4381°N 0.0593°W

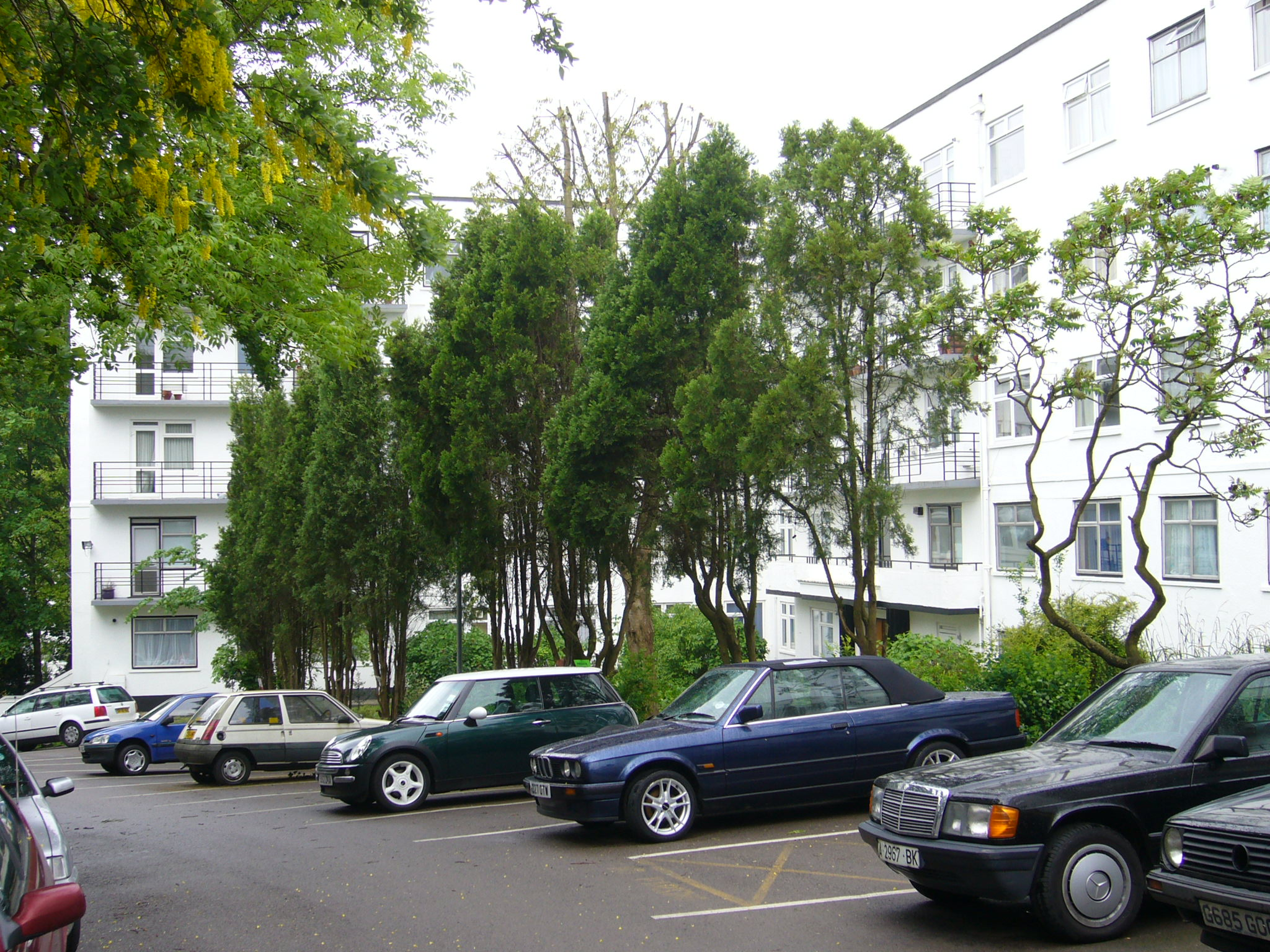
Forest Croft

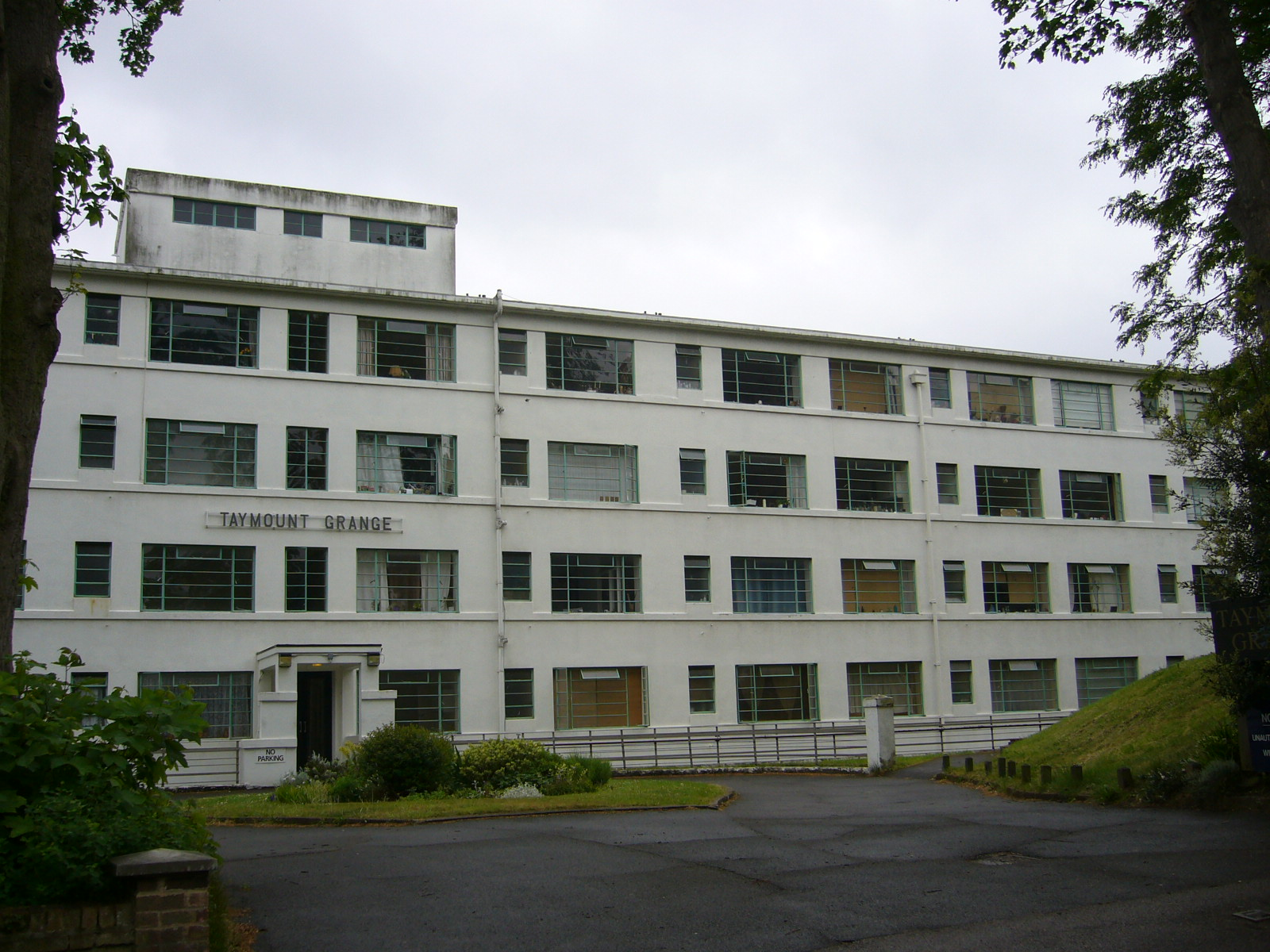
Taymount Grange

Forest Croft and Taymount Grange are two 1930s Art Deco–style mansion blocks situated at the top of Taymount Rise in Forest Hill, London.

Forest Croft was built in 1937 to designs by Arnold Andre Higuer, on a site previously occupied by a house called The Mount. It comprises 63 flats.

Taymount Grange was built in 1935 to designs by George Bertram Carter on the site of Taymount, a 19th-century house, and the former Queens Tennis Club. The developer was Sir Malerham Perks. It has a steel frame with masonry infill and a rendered finish, flat roof and metal "streamlined" windows. The aesthetic is more Style Moderne –being reliant in simplicity of detailing rather than ornamentation.

When built some of the flats comprised two apartments, a large one for the main occupier and a smaller one for the servant. The flats were advertised with the tag "the servant problem solved". There were also a restaurant, lounge and "guest rooms", as well as seven tennis courts, a swimming pool and a putting green.

The television, film and theatre actor, Michael Gambon, lived in the Forest Croft block for four years during his early to mid twenties.

== See also ==
- Du Cane Court
