= Longoni (company) =

European manufacturer of billiards cue sticks

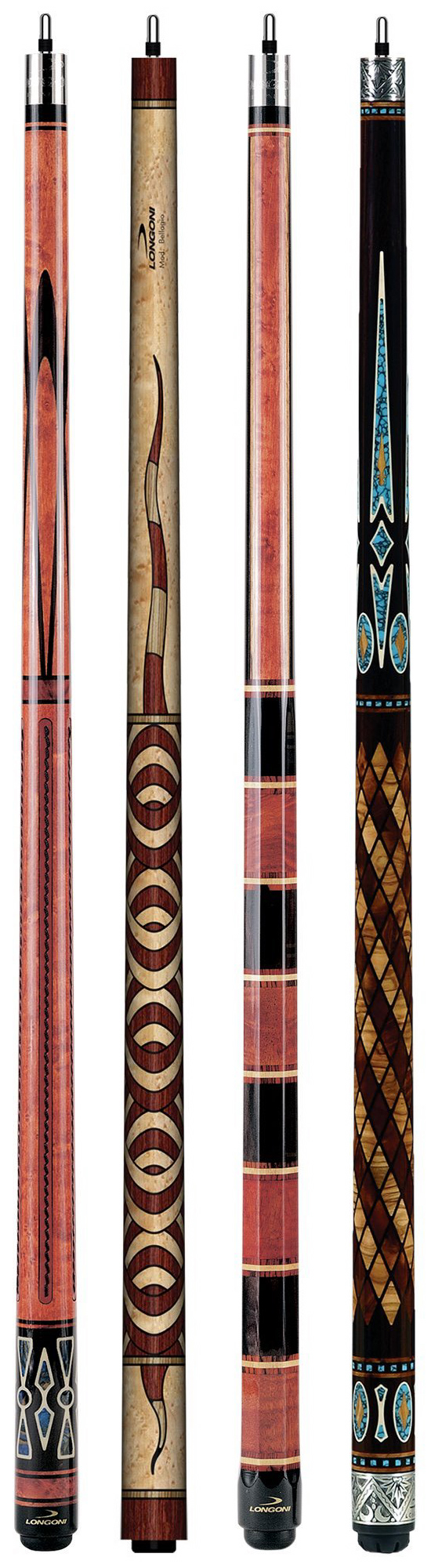
Longoni cues.

Longoni SRL is a European manufacturer of cue sticks. The company, founded by Alessandro Longoni in 1945, is based in Mariano Comense, Italy. Longoni makes cues customized for various carom billiards disciplines, including three-cushion, five-pin, and artistic billiards, as well as pool and Russian pyramid cues.

Over the years, several professional players, including Dick Jaspers and Niels Feijen, have helped design and develop new lines of Longoni carom and pool cues, respectively.

A hallmark of Longoni cues is their often unusual butt designs, including octagonal cuts, sewn-in leather strips, and intricate inlay ornaments. Longoni's two top lines of pool cues, the Classica and Silver series, range from approximately US$1,500 to $6,000.

Longoni supports no-ivory cue production by exclusively using ferrules made of phenolic resin.
