= Forest Hill, London =

Coordinates: 51.439189°N 0.054063°W

Forest Hill
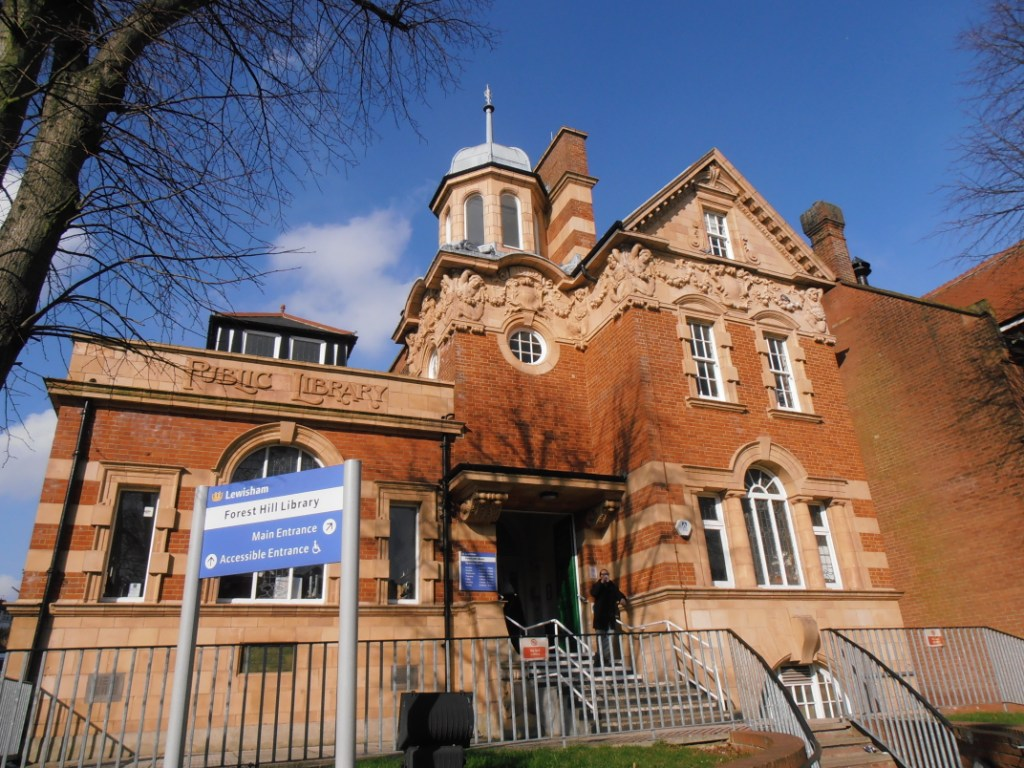
- Forest Hill library

- Location within Greater London
- Population: 14,854 (2011 Census. Ward)
- OS grid reference: TQ354736
- London borough: Lewisham
- Ceremonial county: Greater London
- Region: London
- Country: England
- Sovereign state: United Kingdom
- Post town: LONDON
- Postcode district: SE23
- Dialling code: 020
- Police: Metropolitan
- Fire: London
- Ambulance: London
- UK Parliament: Lewisham West and East Dulwich
- London Assembly: Greenwich and Lewisham

Forest Hill is a district of the London Borough of Lewisham in south east London, England, on the South Circular Road, which is home to the Horniman Museum.

== History ==
A map showing the Forest Hill ward of Lewisham Metropolitan Borough as it appeared in 1916

Like much of Greater London, Forest Hill was only sparsely populated until the mid-19th century. The name Forest Hill, originally simply "The Forest", referred to the woodland which once covered the area and which was a relict part of the Great North Wood.

In 1809, the Croydon Canal opened, however, the large number of locks (28) meant it was not a commercial success, and it was bought by the London & Croydon Railway Company who used the alignment to construct the London Bridge to Croydon railway line opening in 1839. The ponds in the Dacres Wood Nature Reserve and the retaining wall of the footpath opposite the station outside The Signal pub are about the only physical evidence of the canal which still exist.

When the Crystal Palace was moved from Hyde Park to Sydenham in 1854, many large homes were built on the western end of Forest Hill along with Honor Oak. In 1884, London's oldest swimming pool was constructed on Dartmouth Road. The tea merchant Frederick Horniman built a museum to house his collection of natural history artifacts. He donated the building and its gardens to the public in 1901 and this became the Horniman Museum.

== Local area ==
=== Amenities ===
Horniman Museum is home to anthropological and cultural collections, an aquarium and one of the most varied collections of taxidermy in the Northern Hemisphere including the world's first taxidermy of a walrus. It also houses one of the finest collection of musical instruments in the British Isles. Contained within its accompanying gardens is an animal enclosure, flower gardens, and a Grade II listed early 20th century conservatory. Views from the gardens stretch out over central and north London.

Following a successful and widely supported campaign from local group Save The Face Of Forest Hill, Louise House was designated a Grade II listed building by English Heritage.

Forest Hill Library was built in 1901 to an Arts and Crafts design by local architect Alexander Hennell. It is one of over 500 Grade II listed buildings in Lewisham Borough. It was refurbished in 2008.

=== Recreation ===
A few parks are located in and around in Forest Hill. Horniman Triangle Park is located directly opposite Horniman Museum and Gardens, with Tarleton Gardens close by. Blythe Hill is located on the border with Catford, while in Sydenham, Baxter Field, Mayow Park and Sydenham Hill Woods are located on the border with Forest Hill.

Alongside Sydenham Hill Woods, is the Dulwich and Sydenham Golf course, dating back to 1893. There are three nature reserves in Forest Hill: Dacres Wood, Devonshire Road and Garthorne Road. Dacres Wood Nature Reserve is open on the last Saturday of each month and Devonshire Road Nature Reserve on the last Sunday of the month.

=== Architecture ===
With a range of architectural styles spanning the late 19th and 20th centuries, Forest Hill was described by Sir Norman Foster as "a delightful pocket of South London". Of particular note are the Capitol Cinema (latterly a JD Wetherspoon pub), the Horniman Museum, and classic art deco mansion blocks Forest Croft and Taymount Grange.

== Gallery ==
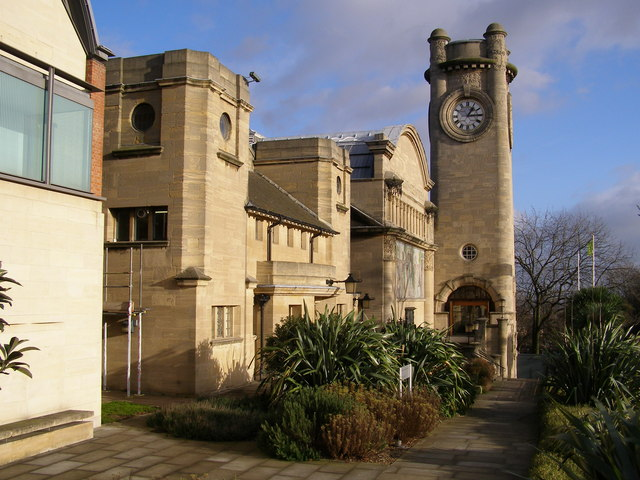
The Horniman Museum

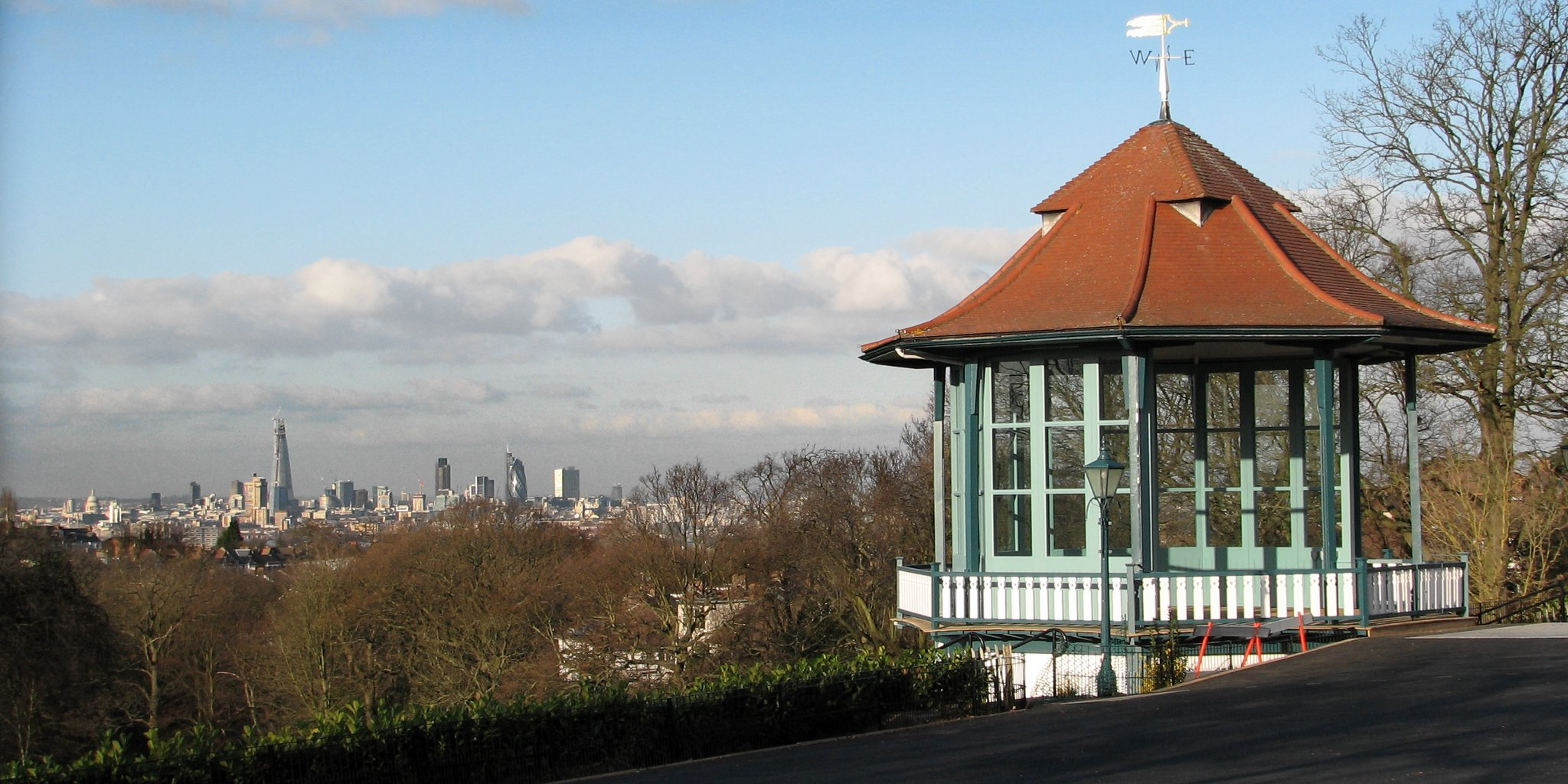
Viewing the London skyline from the Horniman Museum garden

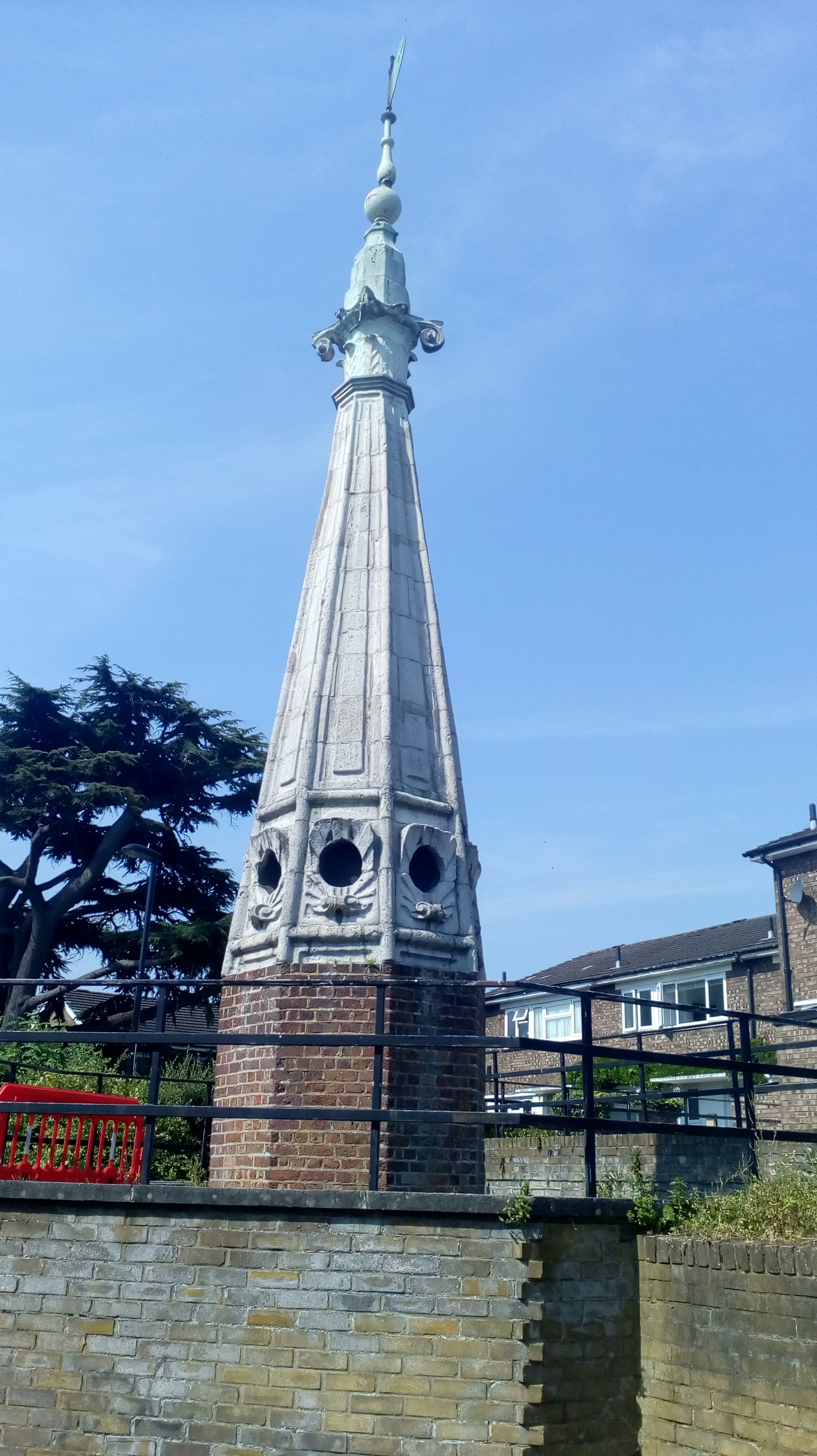
Spire from Sir Christopher Wren's St Antholin's Church which once stood in the City of London, now located in Round Hill, Forest Hill. The land that the spire is now on is now owned by the London and Quadrant housing association.

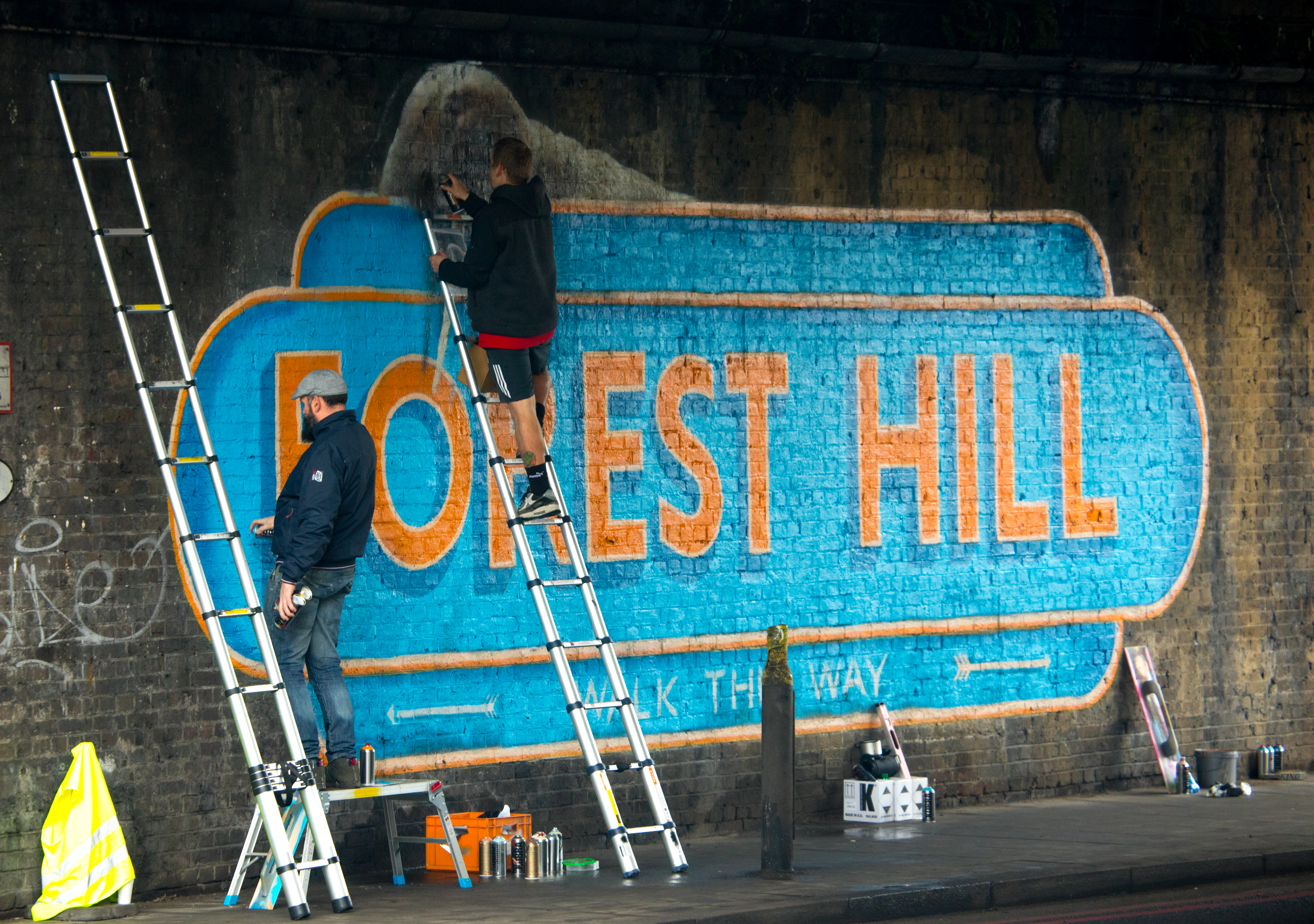
Painted in March 2018, the Forest Hill mural was organised by Forest Hill community group SE23.life.

== Notable residents ==
- Linda Barker, home decor personality
- Dame Doris Beale, Matron-in-Chief of Queen Alexandra's Royal Naval Nursing Service for three years during the Second World War was born in Forest Hill on 9 August 1889.
- Dietrich Bonhoeffer (1906–1945), the German Protestant theologian and Christian martyr killed by the Nazis, briefly lived and preached in Forest Hill.
- A. C. Bouquet (1884-1976), academic, theologian and writer born in Forest Hill
- George Brown, medical sociologist who developed the concept of "high expressed emotion" lives in Forest Hill.
- Raymond Chandler, mystery and thriller writer, author of The Long Goodbye and The Big Sleep. Born in the US, but educated at Dulwich College. Probably lived with his mother at 148 (now 138) Devonshire Road, Forest Hill from 1909 until he returned to America in 1912.
- Andy Coulson, editor, News of the World, 2003–07; Director of Communications, Conservative Party, 2007–11.
- Ernest Dowson, poet
- Desmond Dekker lived in Devonshire Road, more towards Honor Oak.
- Irish-born television, film and stage actor Michael Gambon, famous for portrayal of Albus Dumbledore in the Harry Potter movie franchise lived at Forest Croft in Forest Hill in the early to mid-1960s.
- Henry Charles Fehr (1867–1940), sculptor, was born in Forest Hill
- Denis Gifford, historian of film, comics, radio and television, was born in Forest Hill.
- Kathleen Halpin (1903–1999), public servant and feminist
- Sir Isaac Hayward, politician
- Vince Hilaire, one of the first black players to establish himself in English football was born in Forest Hill on 10 October 1959 and went on to have a distinguished career with local club Crystal Palace.
- Tea merchant Frederick John Horniman (1835–1906) lived in Forest Hill. A keen traveller, he accumulated a large collection of items relating to local cultures and natural history. This became so large that he built a special museum for it, donated to the public in 1901.
- British film actor Leslie Howard (1893–1943) was born in Forest Hill on 3 April 1893
- Craig Fairbrass, actor, lives in Forest Hill
- Tanya Franks, actress
- David Jones, painter & poet
- Hollywood actor Boris Karloff was a resident of Forest Hill Road, Honor Oak.
- Lionel Jeffries, actor and film director, was born in Forest Hill.
- Tom Keating (1917-1984) art restorer and famous art forger, was born and raised in Forest Hill.
- Don Letts, filmmaker and musician
- Singer Millie lived in Forest Hill at the time of her major hit My Boy Lollipop
- Joan Morgan, actress, playwright, novelist, born 1905
- William Page (1861–1934), historian and editor, lived here 1886–96
- Mica Paris, singer/songwriter
- John Parris of Parris Cues world-renowned cue maker.
- Peter Perrett, of The Only Ones, in its 1970s musical heyday.
- Henry Price CBE was a Conservative politician who represented Lewisham West between 1950 and 1964. He founded the "Middle-Class Alliance" and in 1954, London County Council sought a compulsory purchase order for his home in Forest Hill to build council housing.
- Luke Pritchard, lead singer of The Kooks, was born in Forest Hill
- Aaron Renfree dancer and former singer
- Iwan Rheon, singer-songwriter and actor, formerly of the E4 series Misfits.
- Arthur Rhys-Davids, World War I ace fighter pilot was born in Forest Hill
- Jon Robyns, actor, lived in Albion Villas Road in the early 2000's
- Musician Francis Rossi, lead singer and guitarist of Status Quo, was born in Forest Hill on 29 May 1949
- Mary Patricia Shepherd, thoracic surgeon, was born in Forest Hill
- Actor Timothy Spall was a resident of Honor Oak.
- Gavin Stamp, architectural critic
- Doris Stokes, medium
- Broadcaster, journalist and cricketer E. W. Swanton was born in Forest Hill on 11 February 1907
- James Todd, cricketer
- Jackie Trent the singer/songwriter lived in Forest Hill when she first had success in the 1960s
- Hayley Squires actress and playwright, known for Call The Midwife and Adult Material was born in Forest Hill on 16 April 1988
- Rachael Wooding, musical theatre performer, lived in Albion Villas Road in the early 2000's

== Transport ==
Forest Hill railway station is located on the South Circular Road (A205), and is served by frequent London Overground's Windrush line and Southern trains to London Bridge, London Victoria, Croydon, Crystal Palace, Dalston Junction and Highbury & Islington. Forest Hill is also served by a number of bus routes: 75, 122, 176, 185, 197, 356, 363, N63 and P4.
