= Mayow Park =

Park in London, England

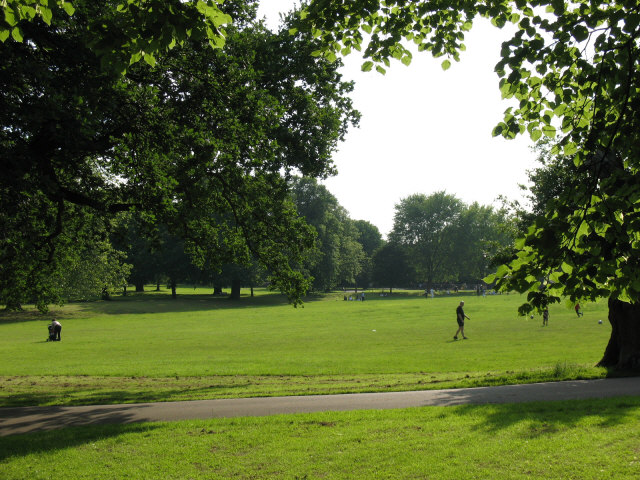
- Mayow Park is the oldest municipal park in Lewisham photo: Stephen Craven, geograph.org.uk
- Interactive map of Mayow Park
- Type: public park
- Location: Sydenham, London, England
- Coordinates: 51°25′47″N 0°02′57″W
- Area: 7 hectares (17 acres)
- Created: 1 June 1878
- Operator: London Borough of Lewisham
- Open: 8am-sunset
- Status: Open year round
- Website: lewisham.gov.uk

Mayow Park, formerly known as Sydenham Recreation Ground, is a municipal park in London Borough of Lewisham. Located on Mayow Road in Sydenham, south east London, it is the borough's oldest park and its second oldest public open space after Blackheath. The park has a Green Flag Award.

== History ==
The park opened in 1878 as Sydenham Recreation Ground. It was built on a site owned by the Mayow family, which at one time owned most of the land between Sydenham Road and Perry Vale.

Reverend William Taylor Jones, headmaster of Sydenham College, played a key role in finding both the funding and the land for the park. His campaign began with an 1875 letter to the local newspaper bemoaning the lack of public space in the borough for recreation and implying that this was having a negative impact on the morals of the population – particularly young people and the poor. Six months later, when an editorial in the paper questioned why so little progress had been made, Taylor Jones discussed the two major issues of funding and finding suitable land.

Taylor Jones formed a committee of influential local residents, including Frederick Horniman and Rev. Augustus Legge and, by February 1876, he was able to announce that Mayow Wynell Adams (then squire of Sydenham) was able to offer a parcel of land for around half its market value.

It took a further two years of negotiations and fundraising before the park opened as Sydenham and Forest Hill Public Recreation Ground in June 1878. Taylor Jones’ role in its establishment is commemorated with a drinking fountain, erected after a public subscription.

== Layout and notable features ==
Covering an area of 7 hectares (17 acres), the site is notable for its mature English oak trees. There are at least 20, including pollarded specimens, that are older than the park. It has been described as Lewisham’s finest collection of mature oak trees apart from those in Beckenham Place Park. Other notable trees include araucaria, ginkgo and holm oak.

The park includes a bowling green, two tennis courts, children’s playground, nature reserve and meadow area. The former pavilion was converted into a cafe in 2014, run by cafe operators Brown and Green.

== Park initiatives ==
Friends of Mayow Park was established in 1993 and is a group of park users that works with London Borough of Lewisham to improve the landscape and community resources of the park. Recent projects include renovation of flowerbeds and installation of a new pathway near the Mayow Road end of the park, and the planting of a community orchard and fruit hedgerow.

There is also a community garden, known as Grow Mayow, located on a former park keeper’s depot, that offers opportunities to get involved with gardening and growing produce.

== External sources ==
- History of area from Lewisham Borough Council conservation document
- Friends of Mayow Park
