= Michael Phelan (billiards player) =

Irish-born American billiards player (1819–1871)

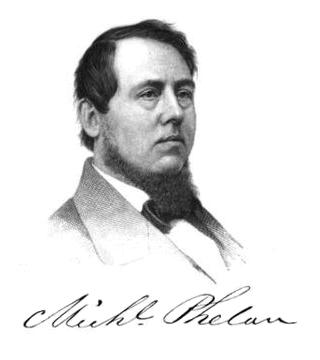
Michael Phelan

Michael Phelan (April 18, 1819 – October 7, 1871) was an Irish-born American billiards player, manufacturer and owner of billiard parlors. He was the first billiards star in the US. In 1850, he published Billiards Without A Master, the first book published in the US on the science, etiquette, and game rules of billiards.

== Early years ==
Phelan was born in Castlecomer, County Kilkenny, Ireland, in 1819 (some records say 1816). His father emigrated to the US that same year, and established himself in the billiard business, running as many as three or four rooms in different parts of New York City at the same time. With much success and liking the country, in 1823, the father sent for his family in Ireland. Phelan remembered his arrival to the US, as well as the billiard table in one of his father's rooms, and how captivated he was when allowed to shove the balls around with the mace; and thus he dated his billiard experience from that time. He was not allowed to use the cue until he was 15, and then, almost immediately, became a good player.

== Career ==
His father apprenticed Phelan to learn a trade, manufacturing jewelry. But after attaining the age of majority, and having married (circa 1837), Phelan was determined to adopt the billiards business for a livelihood. As his father had previously died, Phelan became an attendant at a billiard room. By 1850, Phelan had come to be looked upon as the most expert and scientific player in the country; and in the same year he prepared a work entitled "Billiards Without a Master," which enjoyed a large sale, and was the first book published in the US on the science, etiquette, and game rules of billiards.

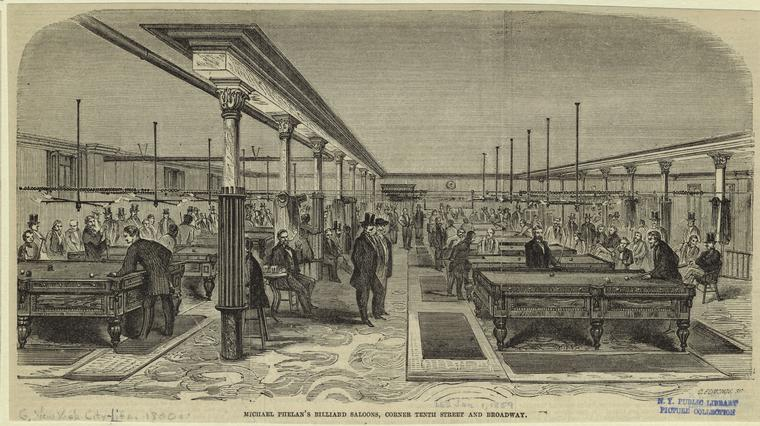
Historic print depicting Michael Phelan's Billiard Saloon located at the corner of 10th Street and Broadway in Manhattan, January 1, 1859

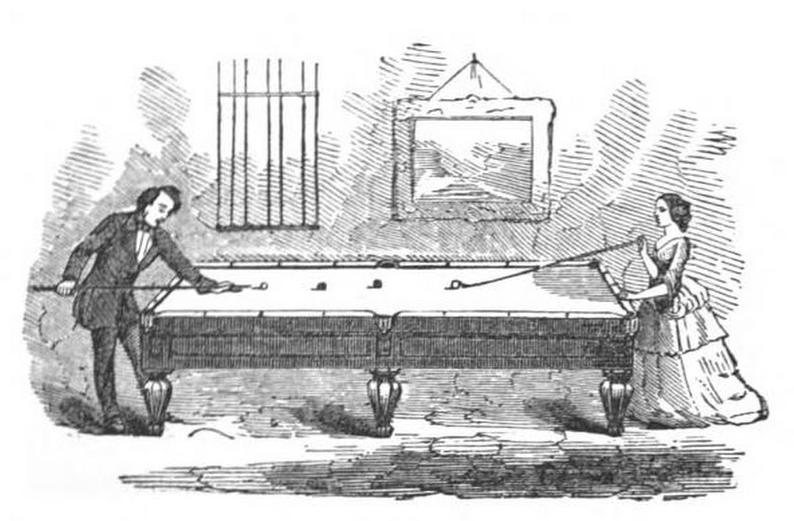
Man playing billiards with a cue and a woman with a mace, from an illustration appearing in Michael Phelan's 1859 book, The Game of Billiards

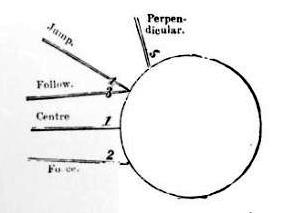
Illustration from Michael Phelan's 1859 book, The Game of Billiards

Phelan was determined to produce an American billiard table that would become the standard model for the whole world. He visited Europe in the fall of 1851, and on his return, in 1852, he had the idea of starting a model billiard-table factory. He left the East Coast in the fall of 1854, and arrived in San Francisco, where he opened an elegant billiard hall which immediately became one of the chief points of interest of the city. Phelan continued his success as a player and was again pronounced unconquerable. In 1854, he invented a new cushion, which was noted for its elastic and lasting qualities. To assist with aim, he added diamonds to the table. Tobias O'Connor and Hugh William Collender manufactured some of the first tables as part of a distinct business, and, in 1854, Phelan gained an interest in the manufacturing business, with the company name changed to Phelan & Collender. On April 12, 1859, Phelan won the first U.S. national billiards championship. The company was dissolved by Collender in 1871 after Phelan's death.

Phelan died in 1871. Billiards player, manufacturer and owner of billiard parlors, Phelan was the first billiards star in the US. He was inducted into the Billiard Congress of America Hall of Fame in 1993.

== Personal life ==
Phelan owned a summer home at Locust Point, Shrewsbury River. He was married to Ann, and they had two daughters, Julia, who married Collender, and Maggie, as well as one son, George, who had been a member of Phelan & Collender. Phelan is buried at Calvary Cemetery.

== Selected works ==
- 1850: Billiards without a master (with D. D. Winant)
- 1858: The Game of Billiards
- 1863: The Illustrated Hand-book of Billiards (with Claudius Berger)
- 1864: Billiard almanac and New York guide
- 1870: The American billiard record
