= Glossary of cue sports terms =

The following is a glossary of traditional English-language terms used in the three overarching cue sports disciplines: carom billiards referring to the various carom games played on a billiard table without pockets; pool, which denotes a host of games played on a table with six pockets; and snooker, played on a large pocket table, and which has a sport culture unto itself distinct from pool. There are also games such as English billiards that include aspects of multiple disciplines.

== Definitions and language ==
The term billiards is sometimes used to refer to all of the cue sports, to a specific class of them, or to specific ones such as English billiards; this article uses the term in its most generic sense unless otherwise noted.

The labels "British" and "UK" as applied to entries in this glossary refer to terms originating in the UK and also used in countries that were fairly recently part of the British Empire and/or are part of the Commonwealth of Nations, as opposed to US and, often, Canadian terminology. The terms "American" or "US" as applied here refer generally to North American usage. However, due to the predominance of US-originating terminology in most internationally competitive pool (as opposed to snooker), US terms are also common in the pool context in other countries in which English is at least a minority language, and US (and borrowed French) terms predominate in carom billiards. Similarly, British terms predominate in the world of snooker, English billiards, and blackball, regardless of the players' nationalities.

The term "blackball" is used in this glossary to refer to both blackball and eight-ball pool as played in the UK, as a shorthand. Blackball was chosen because it is less ambiguous ("eight-ball pool" is too easily confused with the international standardized "eight-ball"), and blackball is globally standardized by an International Olympic Committee-recognized governing body, the World Pool-Billiard Association (WPA); meanwhile, its ancestor, eight-ball pool, is largely a folk game, like North American bar pool, and to the extent that its rules have been codified, they have been done so by competing authorities with different rulesets. For the same reason, the glossary's information on eight-ball, nine-ball, and ten-ball draws principally on the stable WPA rules, because there are many competing amateur leagues and even professional tours with divergent rules for these games.

Foreign-language terms are generally not within the scope of this list, unless they have become an integral part of billiards terminology in English (e.g. massé), or they are crucial to meaningful discussion of a game not widely known in the English-speaking world.

== 1–9 ==
1 ball
Also the 1. The object ball numbered 1; in American-style pool ball sets, it is solid yellow.
1-cushion
See the One-cushion billiards main article.
1-pocket
See the One-pocket main article for the game.
2 ball
Also the 2. The object ball numbered 2; in American-style pool ball sets, it is solid blue. In some American snooker ball sets, the yellow ball is numbered 2, its point value.
3 ball

Also the 3. The object ball numbered 3; in American-style pool ball sets, it is solid red. In some American snooker ball sets, the green ball is numbered 3, its point value.
3-cushion
See the Three-cushion billiards main article for the game.
4 ball

Also the 4. The object ball numbered 4; in American-style pool ball sets, it is solid purple or rarely pink. In some American snooker ball sets, the brown ball is numbered 4, its point value.
5 ball
Also the 5. The object ball numbered 5; in American-style pool ball sets, it is solid orange. In some American snooker ball sets, the blue ball is numbered 5, its point value.
5-pins
See the Five-pin billiards main article for the formerly Italian, now internationally standardized game; or Danish pin billiards for the five-pin traditional game of Denmark.
6 ball

Also the 6. The object ball numbered 6; in American-style pool ball sets, it is solid green. The 6 is the money ball (or game ball) in a game of six-ball. It is the last ball that must be pocketed, after the remaining five object balls have been pocketed, or may be pocketed early to win the game so long as the lowest-numbered ball on the table is struck before the 6. In other games, such as eight-ball, the 6 is simply one of the regular object balls. In some American snooker ball sets, the pink ball is numbered 6, its point value.
7 ball

Also the 7. The object ball numbered 7; in American-style pool ball sets, it is solid maroon, brown, or rarely tan. Some variants, for the seven-ball game, are brown with a black or white stripe. The 7 is the money ball (or game ball) in a game of seven-ball. It is the last ball that must be pocketed, after the remaining six object balls have been pocketed, or may be pocketed early to win the game so long as the lowest-numbered ball on the table is struck before the 7. In other games, such as eight-ball, the 7 is simply one of the regular object balls. In some American snooker ball sets, the black ball is numbered 7, its point value.
8 ball

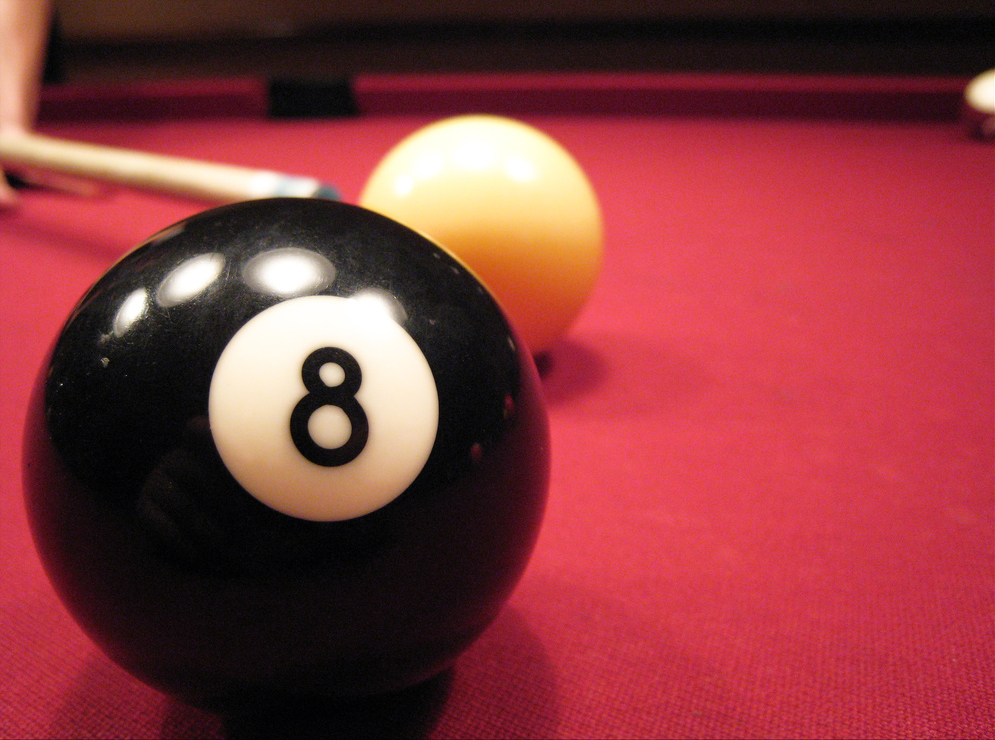
An 8 ball (with the cue ball behind it)

Also the 8. The object ball numbered 8; in both American- and British-style pool ball sets, it is solid black, though some of the latter use an unnumbered black ball. The 8 is the money ball (or game ball) in a game of eight-ball and related games. It is the last ball that must be pocketed, after the suit of seven object balls belonging to the player who is shooting for the 8. (Pocketing the 8 early is a loss of game—unless done on the break shot, in most rules variants.) In other games, such as nine-ball and straight pool, the 8 is simply another object ball. Due to its striking colouration and regular use as a money ball, it is commonly used as a symbol in popular culture.
9 ball

Also the 9. The object ball numbered 9; in American-style pool ball sets, it is striped yellow. The 9 is the money ball (or game ball) in a game of nine-ball. It is the last ball that must be pocketed, after the remaining eight object balls have been pocketed, or may be pocketed early to win the game so long as the lowest-numbered ball on the table is struck before the 9. In other games, such as eight-ball, the 9 is simply one of the regular object balls.
9-pins
See the Goriziana main article for the game sometimes called nine-pins.
10 ball

Also the 10. The object ball numbered 10; in American-style pool ball sets, it is striped blue. The 10 is the money ball (or game ball) in a game of ten-ball. It is the last ball that must be pocketed, after the remaining nine object balls have been pocketed, or may be pocketed early to win the game so long as the lowest-numbered ball on the table is struck before the 10, and the 10 ball and pocket are called. In other games, such as eight-ball, the 10 is simply one of the regular object balls.
11 ball
Also the 11. The object ball numbered 11; in American-style pool ball sets, it is striped red.
12 ball
Also the 12. The object ball numbered 12; in American-style pool ball sets, it is striped purple or rarely pink
13 ball
Also the 13. The object ball numbered 13; in American-style pool ball sets, it is striped orange.
14 ball
Also the 14. The object ball numbered 14; in American-style pool ball sets, it is striped green.
15 ball
Also the 15. The object ball numbered 15; in American-style pool ball sets, it is striped maroon, brown, or rarely tan.
16-red clearance
In snooker, a total clearance in which the break starts with a free ball. The break includes potting a colour ball counting as a red and all 15 reds.

== A ==
above
Used in snooker in reference to the position of the cue ball. It is above the object ball if it is off-straight on the baulk cushion side of the imaginary line for a straight pot (e.g. "he'll want to finish above the blue in order to go into the pink and reds"). It is also common to use the term high instead.
action
1. Gambling or the potential for gambling (US).
2. Lively results on a ball, usually the cue ball, from the application of spin.
3. Short for cue action.
added
Used with an amount to signify money added to a tournament prize fund in addition to the amount accumulated from entry fees (e.g. "$500 added").
ahead race
Also ahead session. A match format in which a player has to establish a lead of an agreed number of frames (games) in order to win (e.g. in a ten-ahead race, a player wins when she/he has won ten more racks than the opponent). Contrast race [to].
aiming line
An imaginary line drawn from the desired path an object ball is to be sent (usually the center of a pocket) and the center of the object ball.
anchor
To freeze a ball to a cushion; such a ball may be said to be anchored (British: tight). This term is largely obsolete balkline billiards jargon.
anchor nurse
A type of nurse shot used in carom billiards games. With one object ball being anchored (frozen, British: tight) to a cushion and the second object ball just slightly away from the cushion, the cue ball is gently grazed across the face of both balls, freezing the away ball to the rail and moving the frozen ball away the same distance its partner was previously, in an identical but reversed configuration, in position to be struck again by the cue ball from the opposite side to repeat this pattern, back and forth. Compare cradle cannon.
anchor space
A 7-by-14-inch (180 mm × 360 mm) box drawn on the table in balkline billiards where a balkline meets with the cushion that sets the area of the enclosed as part of both adjoining balk spaces. Originally 3.5 by 7 inches (8.9 cm × 17.8 cm) (and called Parker's box), it was introduced to combat the anchor nurse, and was increased to its current size to curtail the effectiveness of the chuck nurse, which was developed as a response to the original box.
angle of incidence
The angle at which a ball approaches a cushion, as measured from the perpendicular to the cushion. The phrase has been in use since as early as 1653.
angle of reflection
The angle from which a ball rebounds off a cushion, as measured from the perpendicular to the cushion.
angled ball
In snooker and pool, a cue ball situated in the jaws of a pocket such that a/the ball-on cannot be struck directly. Compare corner-hooked.
arc
The extent to which the cue ball curves as a result of a semi-massé or massé shot.
apex

The ball placed at the front of a group of racked object balls (i.e., toward the breaker and furthest from the racker), and in most games situated over the table's foot spot.
around the table
In carom games, a shot in which in attempting to score, the cue ball contacts three or more cushions, usually including both short rails.
around the houses
Used in snooker to describe the path that the cue ball must take into and out of baulk as a result of poor position play, specifically coming around the baulk colours off three or more cushions, normally on a shot on the blue to finish on a red as a result of finishing low on the blue.

== B ==
back
Same as stake (verb).
back cut
A cut shot in which if a line were drawn from the cue ball to the rail behind the targeted object ball, perpendicular to that rail, the object ball would lie beyond the line with respect to the pocket being targeted.
backer
Same as stakehorse.
back spin

Steve Davis plays a back-spin ball to prevent the cue ball from falling into the side pocket.

Same as draw. See illustration at spin.

Contrast top spin.
backswing
The part of the stroke where a player's cue stick is moved away from the cue ball before striking it.
bag
Chiefly British. Same as pocket.
baize
A coarse woolen cloth used to cover billiard tables, usually green in colour. Sometimes called felt, based on a similarity in appearance, though very different in makeup.
balance point
The point, usually around 18 inches from the bottom of a cue, at which the cue will balance when resting on one hand.
balk

1. An area defined on a billiard table by one or more balklines. In the eponymous game of balkline billiards, there are eight balks defined by perpendicular balklines, in which only a set number of caroms may be scored before at least one ball must leave the area. In the earlier (and short-lived) "champions' game", there were four triangular balks, one at each corner, defined by single diagonal balklines. Not to be confused with baulk (second definition).
2. An area defined on a billiard table, in games such as pool, snooker, English billiards and bagatelle, by a single balkline (drawn or imaginary) that runs across the table near the head (bottom) end; exactly where depends upon table type and size. This balk is where the cue ball is placed in lagging for lead, for making the opening break shot, and sometimes for other purposes, depending upon the game. This usage of "balk" is strictly technical, and rarely used in practice. In pool, this area is called the kitchen and is divided from the rest of the table by the head string, while in snooker, English billiards and blackball it is the somewhat differently sized and delimited baulk, defined by the baulk line. On baulk tables, which have a "D" inside baulk, and on pool tables with a break box in the kitchen, the actual area from which to shoot is even smaller than the baulk or kitchen, respectively – a balk within the balk.
balkline

1. A line drawn horizontally from a point on a billiard table's rail to the corresponding point on the opposite rail, thus defining a region (a balk). In the eponymous balkline billiards there are four balklines, drawn parallel to and typically 14 or 18 inches from the cushions of the table, dividing it into nine compartments or divisions, of which the outside eight are the balks, in which only a set number of caroms may be scored before at least one ball must leave the area. Not to be confused with baulk line, though the concepts and etymologies are related. See balk (second definition).
2. Formerly, in "the champions' game", a line drawn diagonally from a long to a short rail at the corners of the table, defining a triangular balk space at each.
3. A type of carom billiards game, also called balkline billiards, created to eliminate very high runs in straight rail that relied on repetitive nurse shots.
ball-and-pocket
Same as call-shot.
ball-in-hand
Also cue ball in-hand. The option of placing the cue ball anywhere on the table prior to shooting, in a game of pool. Usually only available to a player when the opposing player has committed some type of foul under a particular game's rules (cf. the free throw in basketball by way of comparison). See also in-hand for the snooker definition. A common variation, used in games such as straight pool and often in bar pool, is ball-in-hand "behind the head string", also "behind the line" or "from the kitchen", meaning the ball-in-hand option is restricted to placement anywhere behind the head string, i.e., in the area of the table known as the kitchen.
ball-on

Any legally strikeable ball on the table in snooker and generally British terminology. For example, in blackball, if a player is playing yellows, any yellow ball (or any solid, from 1 to 7, if using a solids-and-stripes ball set) can be the ball-on until they are all potted, in which case the 8 ball is the ball-on. In snooker, at the beginning of a player's turn, unless all are already potted, any red ball can be the ball-on. Compare object ball.
ball rack
1. Same as rack (noun), sense 1
2. Same as scoring rack
3. A wall rack designed exclusively for storing balls
ball return
A collection bin mounted below the foot end of a table, to which balls potted in any pocket will return by means of gravity-assisted gutters or troughs running from each pocket opening to the bin; these are the ball-return mechanism, which may be internal to the table or an external gutter system. Ball returns have been in use since at least the 1700s. Pockets that simply collect balls are known as drop pockets. A table without a ball return may be called a "drop pocket table", while a table featuring a ball return may be called a "gully table". Coin-operated bar tables have ball-return mechanisms that separate the cue ball from the object balls so that the object balls are captured when pocketed until the game ends, then released when paid for again, while the cue ball is continually returned for continued play after scratches. This type of table can use a variety of methods to distinguish the cue ball from object balls including the Magnetic cue ball, the dense ceramic "rock" and the oversized "grapefruit" ball. Ball return mechanisms have also been devised that use a smaller, lighter cue ball, instead of a magnetic or heavier one. There are tables that use optical sensors to distinguish a standard cue ball from object balls. Some of them are also set up to return the 8 ball as well, so that pocketing it on the break does not end the game.
banger
A derogatory term for a recreational or beginning player who "bangs" the balls without any thought for position nor attempt to control the cue ball; also a reference to the predilection of beginners to often hit the cue ball far harder than necessary. Compare British potter.
bank
1. Same as cushion.
2. Same as bank shot.
bank shot
Also bank. Shot in which an object ball is driven to one or more rails prior to being pocketed (or in some contexts, prior to reaching its intended target; not necessarily a pocket). Sometimes "bank" is conflated to refer to kick shots as well, and in the UK it is often called a double.
bank-the-8
A rule variant common in bar pool versions of eight-ball, in which the 8-ball must be pocketed on a bank shot (generally this would either be accomplished via a bank shot proper or a kick shot); shooting the 8 straight in is a loss of game. Players may agree before the game begins to invoke this rule, or one player may challenge another player (who might accept or refuse) to conclude the game in this manner after it is already under way. Playing bank-the-8 can be considered rude if many other players are waiting to use the table, since it often makes the game last considerably longer. Often on bar tables three scratches while shooting for the 8 determines a loss. The same with last-pocket.
bar player
Also bar league player. A player that predominantly plays in bars/pubs, or is in a bar-based pool league. Often used pejoratively by pool hall players to refer to a perceived lesser skill level of such players. See also bar pool, bar table.
bar pool

Pool, almost always a variant of eight-ball, that is played by bar players on a bar table. Bar pool has rules that vary from region to region, sometimes even from venue to venue in the same city, especially in the U.S. Wise players thus ensure understanding of and agreement to the rules before engaging in a money game under bar rules. Typical differences between bar pool and tournament eight-ball are the lack of ball-in-hand after a foul, the elimination of a number of fouls, and (with numbered ball sets) the requirement that most aspects of a shot be called (including cushions and other object balls to be contacted) not just the target ball and pocket. Bar pool has evolved into this "nitpicky" version principally to make the games last longer, since bar pool is typically played on coin-operated tables that cost money per-game rather than per-hour. Competitive league pool played on bar tables, however, usually uses international, national or local/regional league rules, and is not what is usually meant by "bar pool". Not to be confused with the game of bar billiards.
bar table

A distinctive size of pool table found in bars, pubs, or taverns as well as venues such as family entertainment centers, arcades and bowling alleys. These are smaller than the full-size tables found in pool halls. While typical professional and competition tables are 9 ft × 4 1/2 ft (2.7 m × 1.4 m), bar tables are typically 7 ft × 3 1/2 ft (2.1 m × 1.1 m). In bars they are almost always coin-operated. Another distinguishing factor is the cue ball; these tables capture pocketed object balls to remove them from play, but selectively return a scratched cue ball. The cue balls historically were differently sized or of different density so they could be mechanically separated. Because this changes the mechanics of the cue ball, these cue balls do not play as competition cue balls, and they are therefore deprecated by aficionados. However, modern bar tables typically make use of a magnetic layer inside a regulation size and weight cue ball paired with a magnet mechanism within the table's ball return system that separates out the cue ball without requiring cue ball characteristics that affect play. Systems that use optical sensors to distinguish the cue ball have also been introduced. Pool hall players complain also that the cloth used on bar tables is often greatly inferior (in particular that it is "slow" and that english does not "take" enough), and often find that the cushions are not as responsive as they are used to.
baulk
Also baulk area, baulk end. In snooker, English billiards, and blackball, the area of the bottom of the table that is between the baulk line and the baulk cushion, which houses the "D" and is somewhat analogous to the kitchen in American-style pool.
baulk colour
In snooker, any of the three colour balls that get spotted on the baulk line. The left-to-right green, brown and yellow ball order is the subject of the mnemonic phrase "God bless you".
baulk cushion
In snooker, the cushion opposite the top cushion and bounded by the yellow and green pockets. Also known as the bottom cushion.
baulk line
Also baulk-line. A straight line drawn 29 inches (73.66 cm) from the face of the baulk cushion on a standard 6 × 12 foot snooker table. Its positioning varies on other sizes of tables. Baulk lines may also be drawn on English billiards tables, and even British-style pool tables. The baulk line is an integral part of the "D". The baulk line's position is always determined by measurement from the baulk cushion, in contrast to the similar but different head string, the position of which is determined by the diamonds. Not to be confused with balkline.
baulk pocket
In snooker, a corner pocket located at either end of the baulk cushion. The yellow pocket and green pocket are both baulk pockets.
baulk rail
Same as bottom rail (UK), head rail (US).
baulk spot

The spot, usually unmarked because of its obviousness at the intersection of the baulk line and long string. As such, it is also the middle of the flat side of the "D". In snooker, same as brown spot. Compare head spot.
bed
The flat surface of a table, exclusive of the cushions. The bed is covered with billiard cloth like the cushions. The playing area of the table consists of the bed except where the cushion overhangs the bed, i.e. it is all of the bed between the cushion noses. Quality beds are made of smooth-ground slate, though very cheap tables may use particle board or plywood. The earliest beds were simply the surfaces of the wooden tables on which the game was played.
be in stroke
See In stroke.
below
Used in snooker in reference to the position of the cue ball. It is "below" the object ball if it is off-straight on the top cushion side of the imaginary line for a straight pot (e.g. she will want to finish below the black in order to go into the reds). This may seem counterintuitive; see above for an explanation.
big

In eight-ball, to be shooting the striped suit (group) of balls (9 through 15); "you're big, remember", "you're big balls" or "I've got the big ones". Compare stripes, yellows, high, overs; contrast little. Not to be confused with the carom billiards concept of a big ball.
big ball
A carom billiards metaphor, it refers to an object ball positioned and being approached in such a manner that a near miss will rebound off a cushion and still score. It is as if the ball were larger than normal, making it easier to contact. Normally a ball near a rail is a big ball, but only if being approached from an angle and if all the prerequisite rails have already been contacted. Not to be confused with the eight-ball term "the big balls", referring to the higher-numbered striped balls. In older British usage the concept was referred to as "large ball". See also big pocket.
big pocket
A pool and occasionally snooker term (inherited from carom billiards by way of "big ball", above), it is a metaphor for a shot that is very difficult to miss pocketing for any of a number of reasons, most commonly: either the object ball is positioned such that a near miss on one side of it will likely cause the cue ball to rebound off the rail into the object ball and pocket it anyway; or another ball is positioned such that if the target ball does not go straight in, it is still likely to go in off the other ball in a kiss. It is as if the pocket, for this one shot, had become larger. The term can also refer to the angle of shot toward a pocket, especially a side pocket; the pocket is said to be "bigger", for example, on a shot that is only a 5-degree angle away from straight on, than on a 45-degree angle shot which is much more likely to hit one of the cushion points and bounce away.
billiard

1. Any shot in which the cue ball is caromed off an object ball to strike another object ball (with or without contacting cushions in the interim).
2. In certain carom billiards games such as three-cushion, a successful attempt at making a scoring billiard shot under the rules for that game (such as contacting three cushions with the cue ball while executing the billiard). A failed attempt at scoring would, in this context, not be called "a billiard" by players of such games even if it satisfied the first, more general definition.
billiard marker
1. A person who records the points for each player during a game;
2. A scoreboard.
billiards
1. In the US, Canada and in many different countries and languages (under various spellings) as well as historically, generally refers to all cue sports;
2. Sometimes refers to just carom games as opposed to pool (especially in the US and Canada);
3. In British terminology, chiefly refers to the game known in the rest of the world as English billiards.
billiards glasses

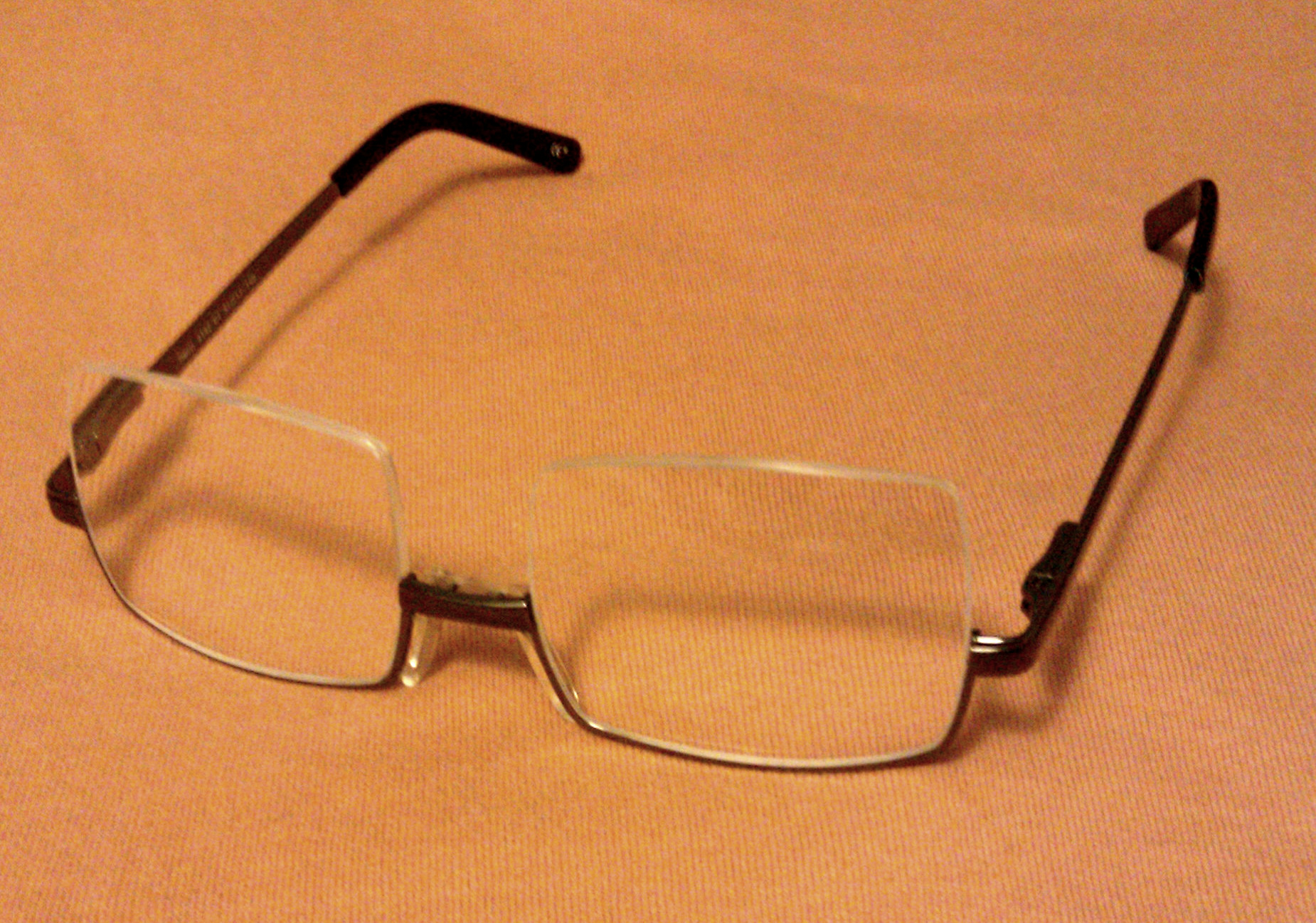
Billiards glasses

Also pool spectacles, snooker specs, etc.

Eyeglasses specially made for cue sports, with tall lenses, set unusually high, so that when the head is lowered over the cue stick for aiming, with the nose pointing downward, the eyes can still look through the lenses instead of over them. They are especially popular among snooker players (notably, 1985 World Champion Dennis Taylor).
black ball

1. In snooker, the highest-value colour ball on the table, being worth seven points. It is placed on the black spot. In some snooker ball sets, it is numbered "7" on its surface.
2. Chiefly British: The 8 ball in a pool set, applying both to the casino balls typically used in blackball pool as well as the solids-and-stripes used in other pool games, such American-style eight-ball, nine-ball and straight pool. In some casino ball sets, the black ball is actually striped black on white.
black spot
The marked spot on a snooker table at which the black ball is placed. On tournament-size tables, it is 12 3/4 inches (324 mm) from the top cushion, on the long string. That is, it is between the top cushion and the pyramid.
blank
1. An unfinished bottom half of a two-piece cue (the butt section) with the splice completed, but the cue not yet turned on a lathe to produce the final shape, and certain features having not yet been added such as a wrap, joint mechanism, butt cap, bumper and inlays.
2. An unsuccessful inning at the table. Also known as a duck egg, goose egg, cipher or naught.
blue ball

1. In snooker, the colour ball worth five points, placed on the blue spot in the centre of the table. In some ball sets, it is numbered "5" on its surface.
2. In blackball pool, a common alternate colour for the reds group.
blue spot
The marked spot on a snooker table at which the blue ball is placed. Regardless of table size, it is at the lengthwise and widthwise centre of the table (i.e. it is the same as the centre spot.
body english
The useless but common practice of contorting one's body while a shot is in play, usually in the direction one wishes a ball or balls to travel, as if in the vain hope that this will influence the balls' trajectories; the term is considered humorous. See also english.
bottle

The bottle used in various games to hold numbered peas, it is employed to assign random spots to players in a roster (such as in a tournament), or to assign random balls to players of a game (such as in kelly pool and bottle pool).
bottom
1. Chiefly British: The half of the table from which the break shot is taken. This usage is conceptually opposite that in North America, where this end of the table is called the head. Contrast top. See also baulk.
2. Chiefly American: Exactly the opposite of the above – the foot end of the table. No longer in common usage.
3. Short for bottom spin, i.e. same as screw (British), draw (American).
bottom cushion
Chiefly British: The cushion on the bottom rail. Also known as the baulk cushion, especially in snooker. Compare head cushion (U.S.); contrast top cushion.
bottom rail
Chiefly British: The short rail at the bottom of the table. Traditionally this is the rail on which the table manufacturer's logo appears. Also known as the baulk rail, especially in snooker. Compare head rail (U.S.); contrast top rail.
bottom spin

Same as back spin, i.e. screw (UK), draw (US). Contrast top spin. See illustration at spin.
bouclée
A type of bridge formed between the thumb and forefinger, creating a loop for the cue to pass through. Principally used in carom billiards, the term is French for 'curled'.
break
1. Also break shot or break off, as a noun. Typically describes the first shot in most types of billiards games. In carom games it describes the first point attempt, as shot from an unvarying cue ball and object balls placement; in many pool games it describes the first shot, which is used to separate the object balls that have been racked together;
2. A series of consecutive pots by a player during a single inning. Most often applied in snooker and English billiards, e.g., "The player had a break of 89 points." (Chiefly British; compare US run.) See also maximum break and century break.
break and dish
Same as break and run (chiefly British).
break and run
Also break and run out. Chiefly American: In pool games, when a player breaks the racked object balls, pockets at least one ball on the break, and commences to run out the remaining object balls without the opponent getting a visit at the table. Hyphenated when used as an adjective or compound noun instead of a verbal phrase. See also run the table, rack and run.
break ball
In straight pool, the last object ball left on a table before the remaining fourteen balls must be racked so the player at the table may continue their run. It is called the "break ball" because it is common for players to try to leave this ball in such a position that they may easily pot it and billiard off of it to break open the rack of fourteen balls and continue their run.
break box

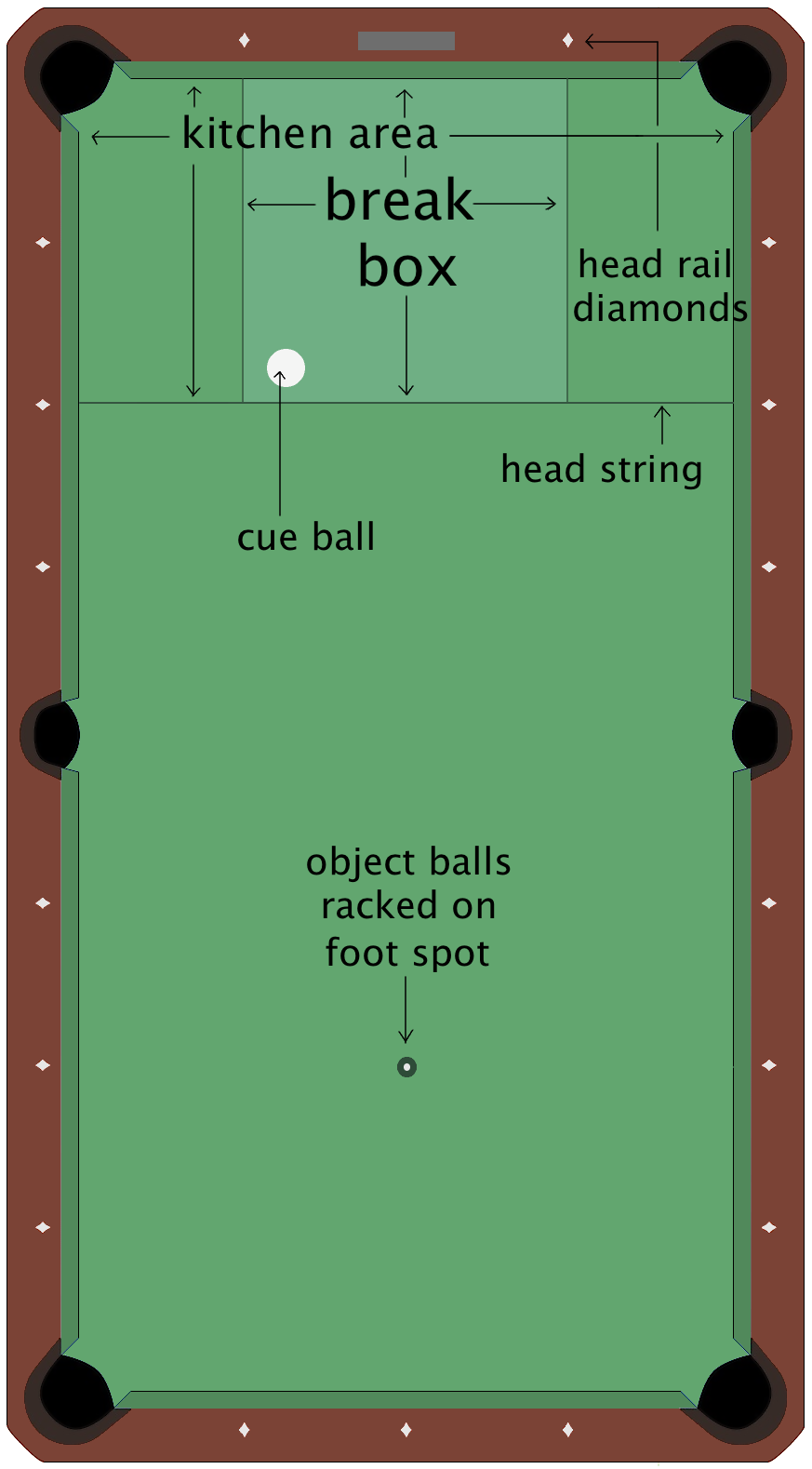
Diagram showing the break box and its relation to the kitchen area and head string

In European Pocket Billiard Federation (EPBF) nine-ball, the break box is a zone in the "kitchen" of the head (British: bottom) of the table, from which the break shot must be taken with the cue ball. The break box consists of the middle 50% of the kitchen area, delimited latitudinally by the head rail (British: bottom rail) and head string (not the baulk line), and longitudinally by two parallel lines drawn (on the cloth, or more often imaginarily) from the head rail diamonds that are closest to the head corner pockets, out to the head string (see illustration to the right) on either side. This departure from WPA World Standardised Rules defeats the common break-from-the-side-rail technique for pocketing the 9 ball to win the game on the break; while 9 ball breaks are still possible, they are much more difficult under this rule. This EPBF Euro-Tour requirement was added in 2008 to the Europe vs. US all-star team event, the Mosconi Cup, but has not otherwise been seen much by non-Europeans as of 2011.
break down one's cue
To take one's two-piece cue stick apart. When done before a game's conclusion, it may indicate that the game is conceded. Different leagues have different rules on this matter.
bridge
Either the player's hand or a mechanical bridge used to support the shaft end of the cue stick during a shot. Also the particular hand formation used for this purpose (there are many).
bridge hand
The hand used by a player as a bridge during a normal shot that does not involve a mechanical bridge. The bridge hand is usually a player's non-dominant hand.
brown ball
Also the brown. In snooker, the highest-value baulk colour, worth four points. It is placed on the brown spot. In some (especially American) snooker ball sets, it is numbered "4" on its surface.
brown spot
The spot (often not marked) on a snooker table at which the brown ball is placed. Regardless of table size, it is the middle point of the baulk line. I.e., it is the same as the baulk spot. The left-to-right order of the green, brown and yellow balls is the subject of the mnemonic phrase "God bless you".
bumper
The bumper on the bottom of a cue, usually made from rubber, which insulates the butt cap from contact with the floor and greatly reduces noise. The bumper was first patented in 1880.
burnish
1. To seal the pores of a wooden cue's shaft by rubbing vigorously with some material. Leather is commonly employed for the task, as is paper money.
2. To similarly vigorously rub the edge of a cue tip (especially a new one) to fortify it against mushrooming and ensure that it is perfectly flush with the ferrule.
3. To smooth out minor dents in the shaft with a rigid burnisher.
burnisher
1. A pad, usually of leather, used to burnish (seal the wood pores of) a cue shaft.
2. A rigid tip tool used to finish and harden the sides of a new cue tip.
3. A shaft maintenance tool, most commonly a cylindrical glass rod, used for smoothing minor nicks in the shaft. This is sometimes done after swelling the wood at the nick site with some moist application.
bushka rings
Named after their innovator, legendary cuemaker George Balabushka, bushka rings are decorative bands of material incorporated into pool cues, commonly just above the wrap area, in the form of ebony and ivory blocks, or sometimes other materials, alternating in a checked pattern.
business, doing
Collusion between matchplay opponents who prearrange the winner of a match on which other people's money is wagered, in order to guarantee a payday.
butt
The bottom portion of a pool cue which is gripped by a player's hand.
butt cap
A protective cap mounted on the end of the butt of a cue.
button
A point bead on a scoring string.

== C ==
calcutta
A players' auction at a pool tournament. Each player is called and players and spectators bid on the player. The highest bidder(s) pays their bid to the calcutta, and by doing so invest in that player's success. If a player wins or places in the tournament, those who "bought" the player receive a percentage of the total calcutta payout, usually tracking the percentage payout of the tournament prize fund. Typically, players have the option of purchasing half of themselves when the high bid is won by a third party. Like english and scotch doubles, usually not capitalized.
call
Any instance of a player having to say what they are about to do. For example, in straight pool a player must call the pocket in which a ball is intended to be potted. More formal terms, used in rule books and instructional materials, include designate and nominate. Contrast fish, slop.
call-safe

Applies specifically to games that enforce "call-pocket/call-safe" rules, which require the player to either call the ball and pocket, or call a safety on every shot. After a legal shot, where a called ball is not pocketed as designated, the incoming player has the option to pass the shot back to the player who missed the called shot. If a player calls "safe", then after a legal shot, the incoming player must accept the next shot, and may not pass the shot back to the player who called "safe". A call-shot/call-safe nine-ball example: Player A calls the ball-on, the 3 ball in this case, in the corner pocket but misses the shot. The cue ball rolls down table and comes to rest behind the 5 ball leaving no clear path to the 3 ball for the incoming player B. Since player A did not call "safe", incoming player B may elect to pass the shot back to player A (who must shoot).
call-shot

Describes any game in which during normal play a player must call the ball to be hit and the intended pocket; "eight-ball is a call-shot game." Sometimes referred to as "call[ed]-pocket", "ball-and-pocket rules", etc., to distinguish it from the common North American bar pool practice of requiring every aspect of shots to be called, such as caroms, kicks, and cushions to be contacted (this is sometimes also ambiguously referred to as "call-shot", but more accurately termed "call-everything" or "call-it-all"). Commonly in bar rules terminology, call-shot indicates how the shot will be made as compared to call-pocket which means simply that the ball must go into that pocket, details unnecessary. Though games with called shots technically require all shots to be called, obvious shots are seldom actually called, though such implied called shots must still be made. See also gentlemen's call.
called ball
The ball designated by a player to be pocketed on a shot.
called pocket
The pocket designated by a player to which a ball is to be shot.
cannon
British/Australian and sometimes Canadian term for carom. Formerly (19th century) sometimes spelled canon.
carambole

1. The red object ball in carom billiards games. The term is thought to be derived from an orange-coloured, tropical Asian fruit, called a carambola in English, Spanish, and several other languages, in turn from karambal in the Marathi language of India.
2. A general-purpose term for carom billiards games.
3. (Obsolete.) Alternative name for the game of straight rail.
4. A carom shot.
card
Short for tournament card.
carom

1. Carom came into use in the 1860s and is a shortening of carambola, which was earlier used to describe the red object ball used in many billiards games. In modern usage, the most general meaning of the word refers to any type of strike and rebound, (a carambole) off a cushion or especially a ball.
2. More specifically, short for a carom shot, a cannon in British terminology, in which a point is scored in carom billiards games by careening the cue ball into the two object balls.
3. In pocket games as a general class, carom or carom shot is sometimes used more loosely, between the above two definitions, to refer to clipping an object ball with the cue ball to attempt to send either or both to desirable locations, not necessarily scoring in the process. In games in which pocketing the cue ball is a goal (e.g. Russian pyramid), carom can refer to sending the cue ball into a pocket after contacting an object ball (called a losing hazard in English billiards, it nevertheless scores points; but it is a foul in snooker, called an in-off, and in pool, called a scratch).
4. Short for carom billiards, as in "I do better at carom than at pool." Sometimes pluralized in this sense as caroms.
carom billiards

One of the main classes of cue sports, possibly the oldest, and certainly the dominant competitive form until well into the 20th century. It is played on a table without pockets, and scoring is generally done by driving a cue ball into contact with one object ball, then having the cue ball contact one or more cushions before contacting another object ball; however, there are numerous variations, some of which involve additional objects, such as upright pins as targets or hazards. Carom balls are usually larger than pool balls, and most often supplied in sets of three, though some games such as yotsudama require four. Historically the most popular carom games in the modern era were straight rail and cushion caroms, followed by balkline billiards, in turn supplanted by three-cushion billiards which remains a major competitive world sport and is the dominant cue sport in many countries. Some games, such as English billiards, are hybrids between carom and pocket billiards.
carpetbagger
See lemon and sandbag.
carrom

Carrom is a table-top game of India, sometimes played with a small cue stick though more often with the fingers, in which small disks are slid on a game board to knock other disks into pockets cut into the corners of the board. It is ancestral to several other games, including novuss, pichenotte, pitchnut, crokinole, and Chapayev. Its historical relationship to billiards games is unclear.
casino balls
A set of pool balls divided into suits (groups) of red and yellow balls (typically unnumbered, aside from the black 8-ball) instead of stripes and solids. Most often used for the game of blackball (British-style eightball pool).
catch a stroke
See Stroke, catch a.
centre spot
Also center spot. The spot (usually unmarked, except in snooker) at the geometric center of the bed of the table. It lies at the intersection of the center string and long string. In snooker, it is more commonly known as the blue spot Uncommonly it is also called the middle spot.
centre string
Also center string. The (usually unmarked) line bisecting the centers of the two long rails (and of the side [Brit.: centre] pockets if any) and the center spot. It thus runs widthwise (i.e. the short way) across the center of the table. Its intersection with the long string, running lengthwise down the middle of the table, defines the position of the center spot.
centre pocket

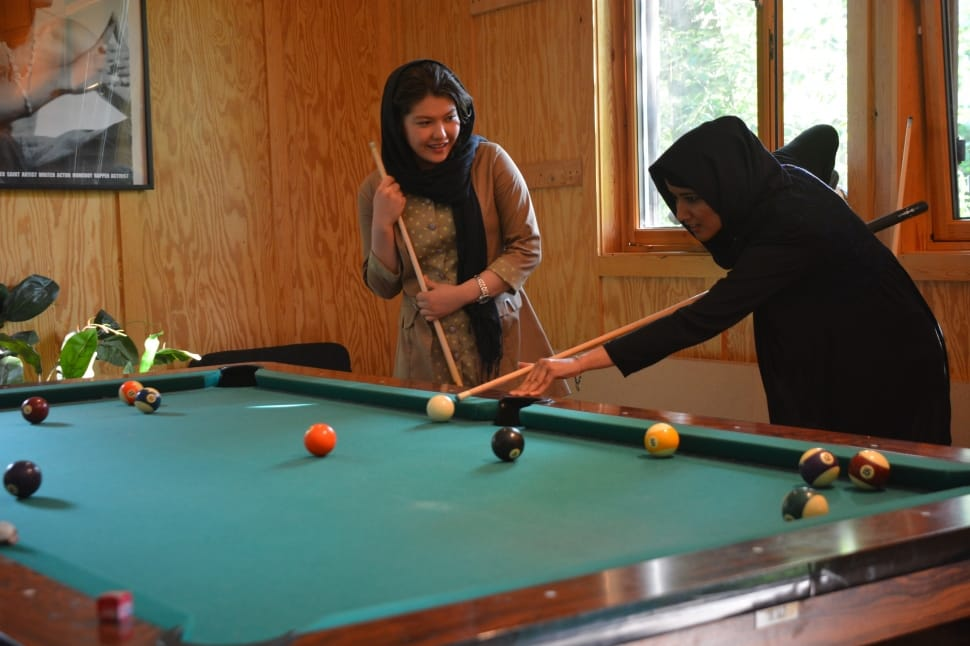
A player with her bridge hand close to the centre pocket

In the UK, one of the two pockets one either side of a pool, snooker or English billiards table halfway up the long rails. They are cut shallower than corner pockets because they have a 180-degree aperture, instead of 90 degrees. Also sometimes called a middle pocket. These terms are not generally used in the US, where side pocket prevails.
century

Also century break.

In snooker, English billiards and other British usage, a break of 100 points or more, which requires potting at least 25 balls consecutively, in snooker, but can be earned via a combination of scoring techniques in English billiards, etc. A century also means scoring 100+ points in a single turn in straight pool. A century of centuries is the achievement of 100 or more century breaks in a career, a feat few players have performed to date. See also double century.
chalk
A powdered substance placed on a cue's tip to increase its friction and thereby decrease slippage between the tip and cue ball. Cue "chalk" is not chalk (calcium carbonate), but a compound of silica and aluminium oxide. Chalk is sold in compressed, dyed (commonly blue) cubes wrapped on five sides with a paper label, and is applied (properly) in a manner similar to lipstick on the mouth. Chalk is essential to shots involving spin; failure to use it frequently during a game is likely to lead to miscuing. Modern cue chalk was co-invented by pro player William A. Spinks and engineer William Hoskins. See also talc, often incorrectly referred to as "hand chalk".
chasing one's money
The inability of some players to stop gambling once they have lost money because they "have" to get their money back.
cheat the pocket
To aim at an object ball such that it will enter one side or the other, rather than the center, of a pocket (and possibly striking the facing of the pocket then rebounding into the pocket). This permits the cue ball to strike the object ball at a different contact point than the most obvious one. Cheating the pocket is employed for position play, to allow a ball to pass another partially obscuring the path to the pocket, and to prevent scratches on dead-straight shots in cases where draw is not desirable (or may not be dependable, e.g. because of distance from the pocket or smash-through). The amount of pocket cheatability available varies widely by game, due to equipment differences. Pool has wide and thus very "cheatable" pockets, while snooker and Russian pyramid have pockets barely wide enough to admit a ball and therefore little room for error or for pocket-cheating.
check side
Also checkside or check. A type of spin imparted to the cue ball to make it rebound off a cushion at a shallower angle than it would if the spin had not been used. Normally played when the natural angle is no good to the player for the next shot.
chesney
Sometimes known as a "Chesney Allen", a slight indentation in the table's slate which can add behavioral aspects to any ball passing over it. Tables containing a chesney are legal for match play, but are generally avoided by serious and professional players.
Chinese snooker

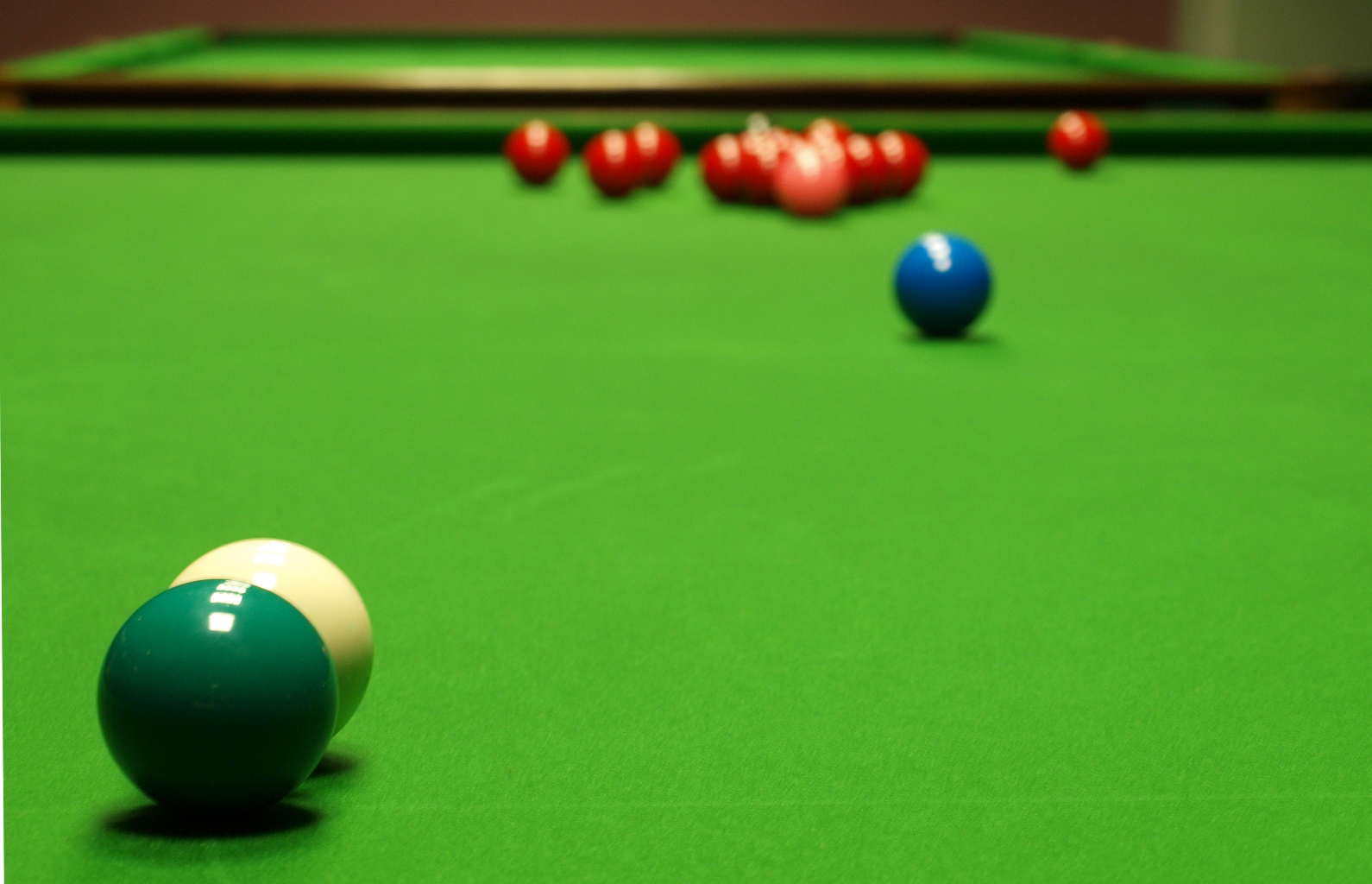
A Chinese snooker on the red balls

A situation where the cue ball is directly in front of another ball in the line of the shot such that the player is hampered by it, having to bridge over it awkwardly with the likelihood of a foul looming if the object ball is inadvertently touched. The term is most common in the game of snooker but is also used in US parlance.
chuck nurse
Known as a rocking cannon in British terminology. A type of nurse used in carom billiards games. With one object ball frozen (British: tight) to a cushion and the second object ball a few inches away from the cushion, the cue ball is gently rebounded off the frozen ball, not moving it, but with just enough speed to meet the other object ball, which rocks in place but does not change position. Developed to thwart the restrictions emplaced by the Parker's box.
choke
To commit errors while shooting, especially at the money ball, due to pressure. See also dog, one-stroke.
cinch a ball
To play a shot with the stroke and speed that makes it easiest to pocket the object ball, even at the expense of sacrificing position.
cinch a pocket
To maneuver a ball on a shot so that it will be favorably positioned for later play into a particular pocket, even at the expense of sacrificing position or the inning to achieve that result.
cinch position
To play a shot using a more difficult application of stroke and speed to achieve a certain desired position for the next shot, even at the expense of or sharply increasing the likelihood of a miss.
clean
1. Chiefly British. Describing a pot that goes straight into the pocket without touching either knuckle.
2. Chiefly American. Describing a shot in bar pool: the pocketing of an object ball in a manner such that the target object ball does not kiss any other object ball, and is not banked, kicked, caromed, or combo'd in, and without double-kissing, though it may hit the knuckles, and depending upon local bar-rules may be allowed to contact either of the cushions, not just at the knuckle, that run into the target pocket. Usage example: "The 7 in that corner, clean". Usage can be narrower, to indicate clean other than as already specified, e.g. "bank the 7 in that corner, clean".
clearance
1. Sufficient space to legally execute a shot, without a foul (fault), e.g. from striking a ball that is not on. Usage examples: "I wonder if I really have clearance for the 8"; "I bet you can't clear the 6 and make that shot." Can apply to any shot situation, including vertically: "a long jump shot that has to clear three balls."
2. In snooker and British blackball, the successful potting of all object balls-on in a single frame. A player is said to have "cleared up" or to have "cleared the table". Also, if a snooker player compiles a break consisting of all 15 reds with colours, then the colours in sequence, this is known as a "total clearance". Compare break and run.
3. A type of maneuver, the clearance shot or clearing shot, in which the cue ball ball is used to move one or more balls out of the way (directly or some by subsequent impact) then continue on to a desired destination. E.g., in a game of nine-ball, if the 1 and the 7 were clustered together along a cushion with the 9 behind them near a pocket, and the cue ball could strike the 1 full face with a result of the 1 heading off the 7 toward the top rail and the 7 rebounding quickly across the table from the cushion, the cue ball, with top spin could retain enough post-impact momentum to continue forward and pocket the 9 as long as both the 1 and the 7 were cleared out the way first. In a game like eight-ball, a clearance shot might also be used at the end of an inning to move some problem balls that are blocking an otherwise easy run, and leave the cue ball in a safe position, in hopes of having a better layout to work with in the next inning. Tickie shots are among the most common clearance approaches, especially for very short distances of intended cue ball travel past the initial contact. "Clearance" is essentially the opposite of "gather", though the latter term is largely confined to carom billiards.
cling
Phenomenon in which two balls, (usually the cue ball and an object ball) have some foreign material – typically often residual cue-tip chalk or dirt picked up from unbrushed cloth – between the balls at the point of contact, resulting in the struck object ball being thrown offline from the expected trajectory, and often also affecting the post-impact behavior of the cue ball. Cling is an exaggerated form of throw, caused by momentary but unusually gripping friction imparted by the chalk or other residue. Also known as skid, or in the UK, kick (sense 2). A typical precaution against cling is to ask for the cue ball and/or object ball to be cleaned by the referee in order to remove chalk that is already on the ball prior to the shot; and (including in non-refereed games) players cleaning the cue ball personally after gaining ball-in-hand. The table cloth can also be brushed between matches. When conditions seem ripe for clings (e.g. visibly dirty balls) some skilled players resort to pre-emptively using (and compensating for) gearing outside english, a general anti-throw technique. However, no precaution can ward against cling resulting from chalk transferred from the cue tip to the cue ball during a single shot. Coincidental cling can therefore cause unpredictable play and occasionally lead to rudimentary shots being missed at even the highest levels of the game. "Cling" (and derived words like "clung", "clinger", "clinging", etc.) may be used as a mass noun, less commonly as a count noun, as a verb, and rarely as an adjective ("cling is annoying", "two clings in one frame", "they clung", "unintentional cling shot", respectively). See kick for snooker-specific notes. See also dead ball, sense 2.
closed bridge
Also loop bridge. A bridge formed by the hand where a finger (normally the index finger) is curved over the cue stick and the other fingers are spread on the cloth providing solid support for the cue stick's direction. A closed bridge is less common in snooker play than in other games. Compare Open bridge.
cloth
The baize cloth covering the tables playing surface and rails, usually made from wool or a wool-nylon blend. In use since the 15th century, cloth is traditionally green-coloured, chosen for its evocation of grass. Sometimes cloth is improperly referred to as "felt." The properties of the cloth used to cover a table, as well as environmental conditions that can affect it—notably humidity, the degree it has been stretched when installed, and its level of cleanness—have a profound effect on play. See also fast.
cloth speed
Same as table speed.
cluster
Two or more object balls that are touching or are close together. Rarer uses of the term include the intended action of a gather shot, and a run of points.
cocked-hat double
A term applied especially in snooker for a type of double off three cushions, e.g. around the baulk colours and into a centre pocket. Such a shot is very difficult to make and would not normally be played as anything more than a shot for nothing.
collar
The protector of the joint of the cue on the joint end of the butt and shaft (i.e., the butt collar and shaft collar respectively). Most modern cues use collars of steel and/or other materials, but carom billiards cues usually have a collarless wood-on-wood joint, as do "sneaky petes".
collision-induced side spin
Side spin imparted to an object ball by the friction from the hit of the cue ball during a cut shot.
collision-induced throw
Same as cut-induced throw.
colour ball

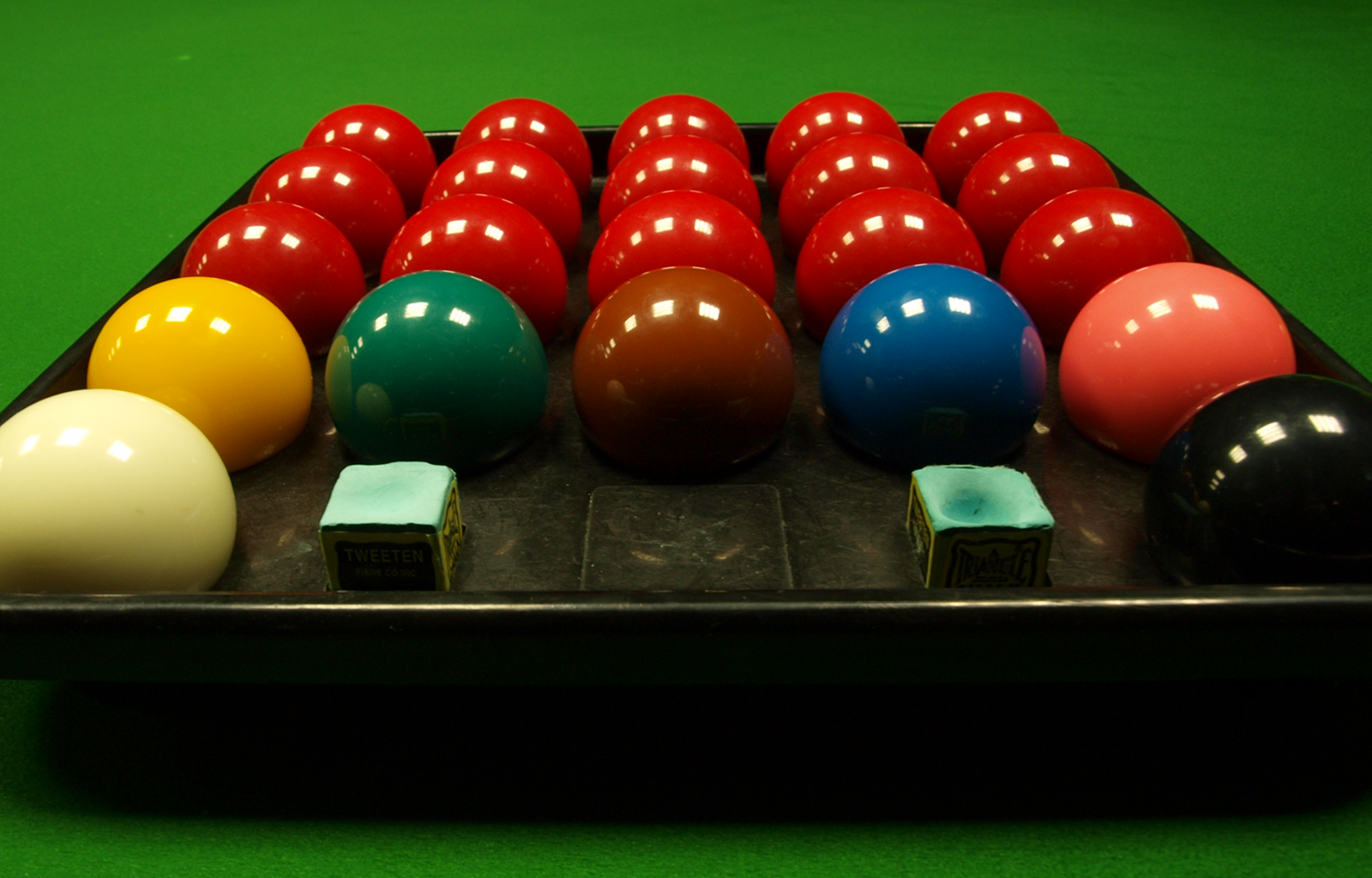
A complete set of snooker balls with 15 red balls, six coloured balls and a cue ball

1. In snooker, any of the object balls that are not reds. A colour ball must be potted after each red in the continuation of a break, and are re-spotted until the reds run out, after which the colours must be potted in their order:

- yellow (2 points);
- green (3 points);
- brown (4 points);
- blue (5 points);
- pink (6 points);
- black (7 points).
Although the full term includes "ball" after the colour, they are most commonly referred to with the omission of "ball", just stating the colour (e.g. "he's taken five blacks with reds so far").
2. In blackball, a generic, collective term for the red and yellow groups of object balls, corresponding to the (originally American, but used much more widely today) solids and stripes, respectively.
combination
Also combination shot, combo, combo shot. Any shot in which the cue ball contacts an object ball, which in turn hits one or more additional object balls (which in turn may hit yet further object balls) to send the last-hit object ball to an intended place, usually a pocket. In the UK this is often referred to as a plant.
concession
In snooker, when a player offers the frame to their opponent, even though balls remain on the table. An accepted concession formally concludes a frame, although the opponent reserves the right not to accept the concession, in which case the frame will continue. A player typically concedes a frame when they require snookers. Conceding a frame before the snookers required stage is regarded as unsporting conduct that will incur a warning from the referee. If the player has already been warned, they will be penalised the following frame.
contact point

1. The point on each of two balls at which they touch at the moment of impact.
2. The point on the cue ball at which the cue tip hits it on the shooting stroke. If this point is not dead-center on the ball, spin will be imparted to the ball.
containing safety
A type of safety shot in the middle of a safety exchange that is not intended to put the opponent in a difficult situation regarding their next safety, but rather played so as to not leave an easy pot on. A typical example in snooker, which sees the most shots of this kind, is a slow roll-up into the pack.
corner-hooked
When the corner lip of a pocket blocks the path of the cue ball from contacting an intended object ball. Interchangeable with "tittie-hooked".
corner pocket
Any of the four pockets in each corner of a pool or snooker table. They have 90-degree apertures and as such are cut deeper than center pockets, which have 180-degree apertures.
count
1. A successful shot or score; more common in carom games.
2. The running score during a game inning where multiple successive points have been made.
coup
See running a coup.
cotgrave
Similar to fluke whereby a shot is played with seemingly no aim to a pot or snooker but ends up with the desired outcome.
counter rack

Same as scoring rack.
cradle cannon
A type of nurse shot used in English billiards in which two coloured balls are positioned on either side of the mouth of a snooker table pocket but not touching and, thus placed, can be successively contacted and scored off over and over by the cue ball without moving them. The cradle cannon's first known use was by Walter Lovejoy in 1907. The unofficial record using the shot is held by Tom Reece who in 1907, over the course of a month, scored 499,135 points using the cradle cannon before stopping without missing. This feat prompted the Billiards Association to outlaw the shot. The official record is held by William Cook with 42,746 points scored. Compare anchor nurse.
creep
Deviation of a ball from its initial direction of travel. Often the result of a poor-quality table and may be an artifact of the cloth, the bed, a ball with uneven weight distribution, or simply the floor the table stands on being uneven. It should not be confused with the nap of the cloth.
cribbage
A set of paired balls in the game of cribbage pool that have a combined number value of 15. For example, the 8 ball and the 7 ball added together equal 15 and thus constitute one cribbage if pocketed in succession.
cross

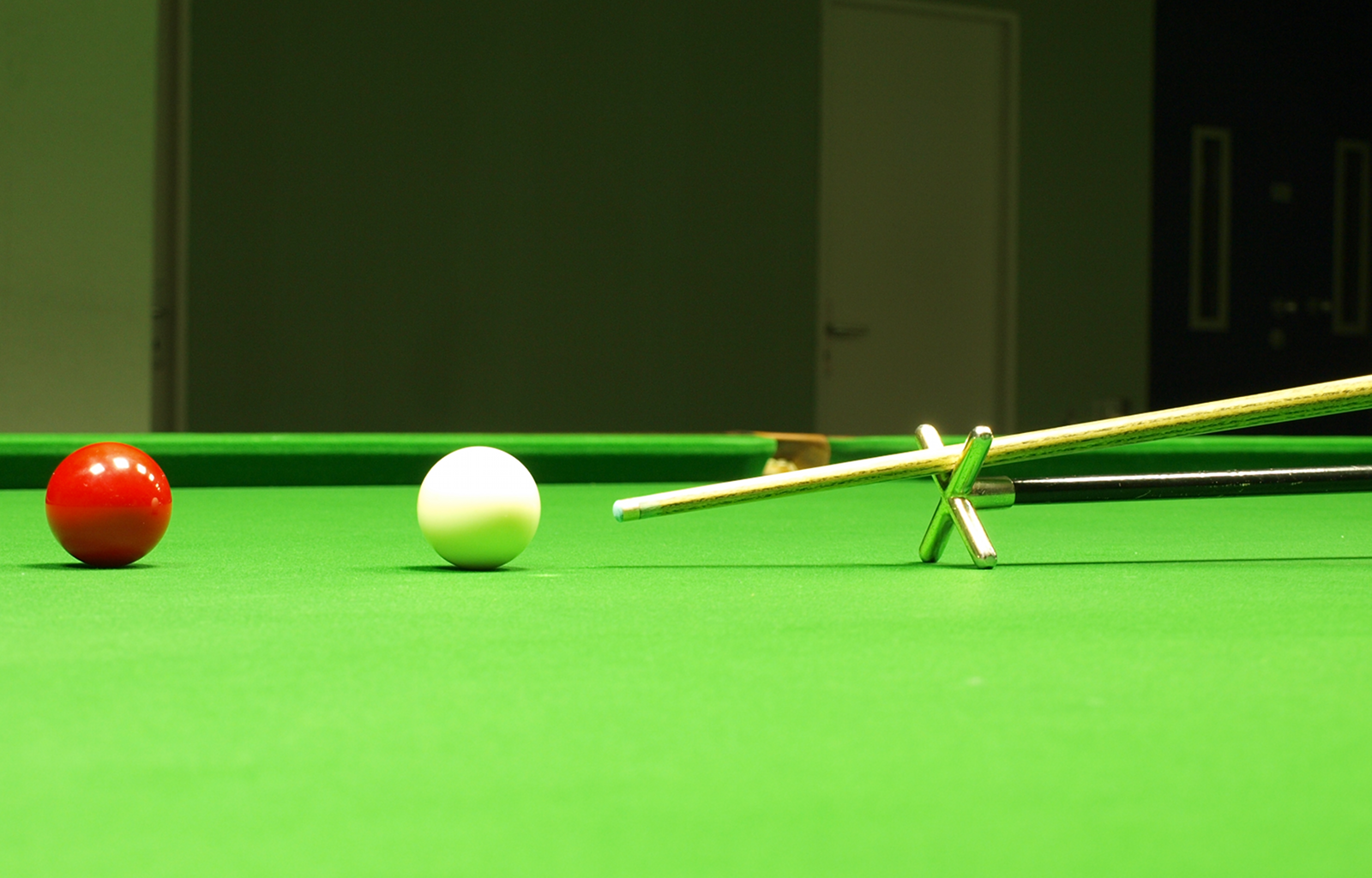
A "cross rake" rest

Also cross rake or jigger. A type of rest, with a straight shaft and "x"-shaped head for resting the cue upon.
cross-corner
A bank shot that rebounds off a cushion into a corner pocket across the table.
cross double
A British term describing a bank shot in which the cue ball crosses the future path of the object ball. Such shots are usually played into a center pocket because there is the danger of a double-kiss if played to a corner pocket.
cross-side
A bank shot that rebounds off a cushion and into a side pocket.
crotch
The corner formed by the rails on a carom billiards table. In modern straight rail rules, only three counts may be made while both object balls are inside the boundaries of the crotch before one ball must be driven away. The boundaries of each of the four crotch areas are measured by drawing a line from the first diamond on the end rail to the second diamond on the long rail.
Crucible curse
The phenomenon that (as of 2026) no first-time winner of the World Snooker Championship has successfully defended the title the following year since it moved to the Crucible Theatre in 1977.
cue
1. Noun: Also cue stick. A stick, usually around 55 to 60 inches in length with a tip made of a material such as leather on the end and sometimes with a joint in the middle, which is used to propel billiard balls. Lightweight, shorter cues are sometimes also used in billiards-related disc games, including novuss and some forms of carrom, crokinole/croquignole, and pichenotte/pitchnut.
2. Noun: Sometimes "cue" is short for cue ball.
3. Verb: Same as stroke, definition 1
cue action
Chiefly British: The posture and timing used by players on their shots, often indicative of how they play in their shot selection. A fast, natural player would tend to be more aggressive whereas a less naturally gifted player might have a slow action and tend to be more conservative on the table. It is widely thought that better snooker players get lower to the table with their chins on the cue, have a straight back leg, their elbow hinging in line with the shot, and a straight follow-through after the cue ball has been struck.
cue ball
Also cue-ball, cueball. The ball in almost any cue sport, typically white in colour, that a player strikes with a cue stick. Sometimes referred to as the "white ball", "whitey" or "the rock". In Russian pyramid, the cue ball is usually red, but any ball can be used as a cue ball, with the exception of the dynamic pyramid variant. For more information, see the billiard ball main article.
cue ball control
See position play.
cue holder
1. A portable device for holding cues upright and at the ready for immediate use. The most common types are either weighted and placed on a table top, with semicircular cut-outs into which cues may lean, or clamping varieties that firmly affix to a table and which have clips or holes into which cues are placed for added security.
2. Same as cue stand.
3. Same as wall rack.
cue power
A chiefly British term describing the amount of control a player can retain when playing shots with heavy spin and great pace; "it took tremendous cue power to get onto the 2 ball having been relatively straight on the 1".
cue rack
1. Same as cue stand.
2. Same as wall rack.
cue stand
A piece of stand-alone or "island" furniture designed to store cue sticks and sometimes other accessories such as the mechanical bridge (rest), balls, chalk, etc., when not in use. Contrast wall rack.
cue stick
Also cue-stick, cuestick. Same as cue.
cue tip
A formed tip, usually made of leather, that is affixed to the end of the cue stick that comes into contact with the cue ball.
curve shot
Same as semi-massé. Compare swerve shot.
cueist
A player of cue sports.
cushion
The elastic bumpers mounted on all rails of a billiards table, usually made from rubber or synthetic rubber, off which the balls rebound. Before the advent of vulcanized rubber manufacturing in the mid-19th century, cushions of early billiard tables were often simply cloth stuffed with straw, cotton, or other fibers; they were not very elastic, but simply quieter than bare wooden boards. The existence of cushions and rails dates to the era of outdoor ground billiards, the courts for which were often bounded by short wicker or wood fences, sometimes padded. For specific modern cushion parts, see: facing, knuckle, and nose.
cut-induced throw
Throw (object-ball deflection away from the tangent line path of the object ball), induced by ball-against-ball "sliding" friction on all cut shots to at least some degree. Sometimes more vaguely referred to as collision-induced throw. One of several types of throw; see throw for details.
cut shot
Technically, any shot that is not a center-to-center hit, but almost always employed when describing a shot that has more than a slight degree of angle.

== D ==
"D", the
A semicircle with an 11 1/2-inch (291 mm) radius, drawn behind a snooker table's baulk line, centred on the middle of the line, and resembling the upper case letter "D" in shape. The "D" is also used in English billiards and sometimes also in blackball and other pool games played on British-style tables. The size of the "D" is typically scaled down on smaller tables.
dart stroke
A short and loose stroke performed in a manner similar to the way one throws a dart; usually employed for a jump shot. See also nip draw.
dead
When two or more object balls are frozen or nearly frozen to each other, such that cue-ball contact with one object ball, without the necessity of great accuracy, will almost certainly pocket an intended object ball in the cluster. The most common form of dead arrangements are the dead combination or dead combo (a combination shot in which contact with the first object ball will pocket another one), and the dead kiss, in which contact with the first object ball will pocket it off of another one. See also wired.
dead cushion
Same as dead rail.
dead ball
1. Short for dead ball shot.
2. A ball that has been used for some time, with a dirty surface, as opposed to a slick new (or highly polished used) ball. A spinning dead ball will transfer more spin to other balls it comes into contact with, and not be as fast on the cloth. Even cut shot angles may be affected because of the cling or skid (British: kick) effect, and professional players often ask a referee to clean a ball, mid-game. Others may actually be more used to dead balls and prefer them.
dead ball shot
Same as kill shot.
dead frame
In snooker, a frame played after the result of the match has already been determined, e.g. "Lindrum crossed the winning line at 76–38 on the second Thursday, ending at 94–49 ahead after the completion of the dead frames."; "Rea showed his best form ... to win the final 'dead' frame".
dead rail
A cushion that has either lost a degree of elastic resiliency or is not firmly attached to the wooden rail; or a rail that is not firmly bolted to the table frame. In all three cases, the result is that balls rebound from the cushion with less energy than is normal.
dead stroke
When a player is playing flawlessly, just "cannot miss" and the game seems effortless.
deadweight
Describing a pot played at such a pace as to just reach the pocket and drop in without hitting the back.
deciding frame
Also decider or deciding rack. The frame that decides the winner of a match when two opponents are tied (at a draw) on an equal number of frames, with just one remaining. The total number of frames in a match is set at an odd number to allow the final frame to act as a tie-breaker – a decider – in the event of the match reaching this frame.
deflection
1. Displacement of the cue ball's path away from the parallel line formed by the cue stick's direction of travel; occurs every time english (side spin) is employed. The degree of deflection increases as the amount of english applied increases. It is also called squirt, typically in the United States, or cue-ball deflection. The physics of the squirt or deflection phenomenon has been analyzed in other contexts, such as with ice-hockey pucks.
2. Also object-ball deflection: same as throw.
deliberate foul
Also deliberate fault. A shot, especially common in straight pool and in some variants of blackball (but not WEPF/EPA rules), in which a player intentionally commits a foul with the object in mind of either leaving the opponent with little chance of running out or simply to avoid shooting where no good shot is presented and to do anything else would give the opponent an advantage. It is often referred to in straight pool as a "back scratch."
designate
Same as call. (Formal.)
develop
To move a ball (usually deliberately) from a safe position, e.g. close to the middle of a cushion or in a cluster, so that it becomes pottable.
diamond
1.

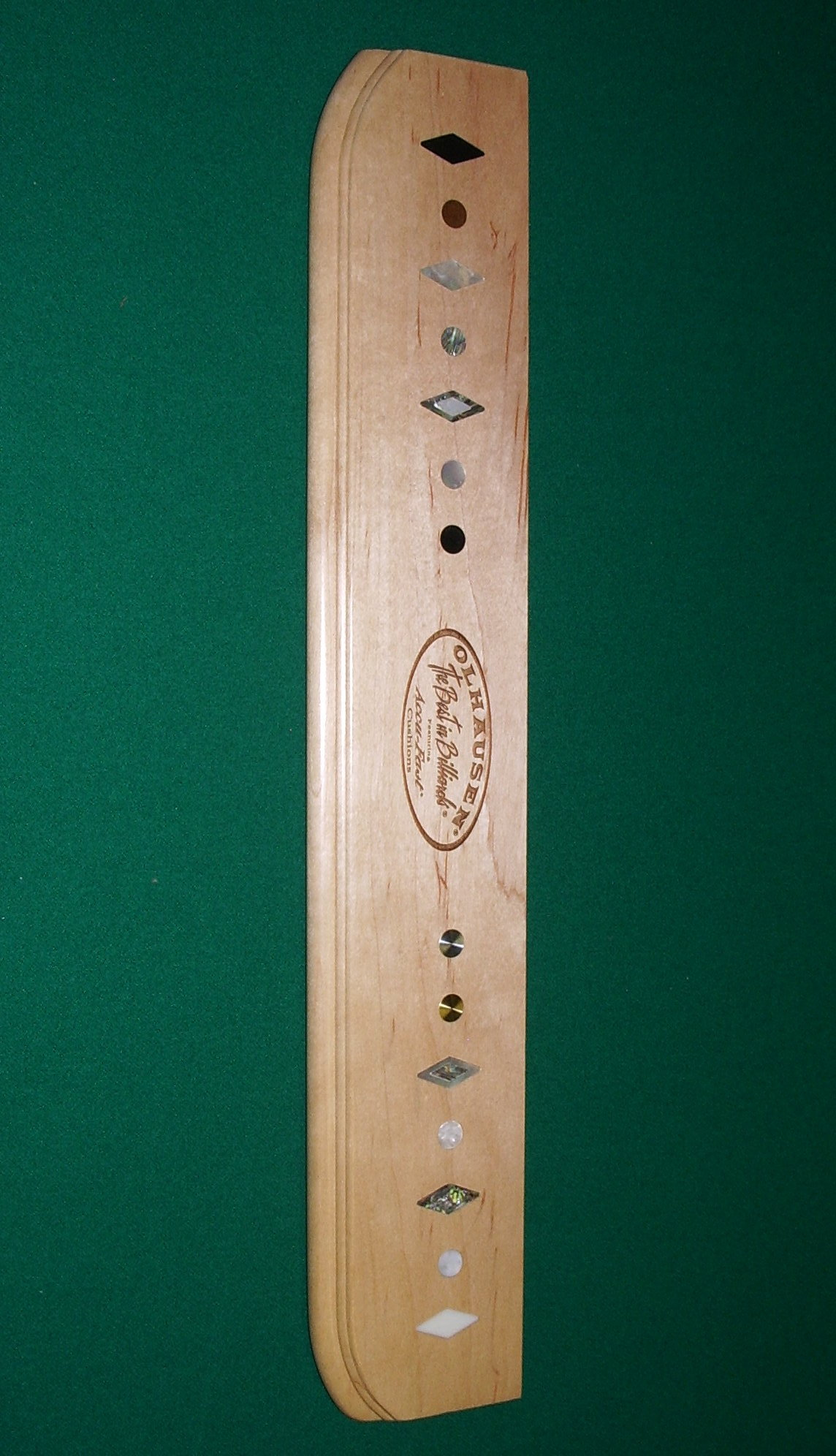
A manufacturer's sample board showing various styles of diamond inlays for billiard tables

One of a number of identical markings, usually inlaid into the surface above the rail cushions, used as target or reference points. Three equally spaced diamonds are normally between each pocket on a pool table. On a carom table, the pockets themselves are replaced by additional diamonds. Diamonds get their name from the shape of the markings traditionally used; though many today are round, square, etc., these rail markings are still referred to as "diamonds". They are also referred to as sights, especially in British English. (See also diamond system.)
2.

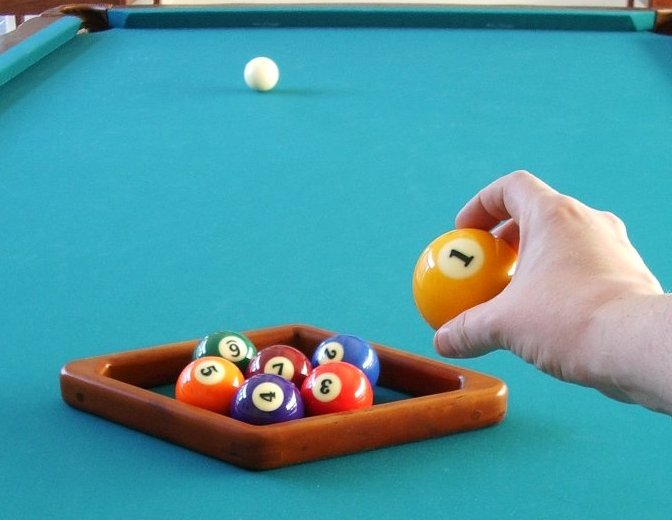
Racking up a game of seven-ball using the diamond rack more commonly used for nine-ball, but sideways. The 1 ball is about to be placed on the foot spot to complete the rack.

A particular shape of ball rack, in the form of a parallelogram ("diamond shape"), used for racking games of nine-ball and seven-ball, though the triangle rack can also be used for the former, and hexagonal racks also exist for the latter. (See also triangle.)
diamond system
Any system for banking or kicking balls off multiple rails which uses table diamonds as aiming references.
dirty combo
A combination in 8-ball or blackball that involves balls of differing groups
discipline
1. A cue sports game (such as eight-ball, three-cushion billiards, 18.2 balkline, etc.), especially as a professional or serious amateur specialization: "He was a World Champion in three billiards disciplines."
2. An artistic pool term for a category of trick shots; artistic pool is divided into eight disciplines, and APTSA tournaments present both discipline-specific and all-around awards.
dish
Same as run out (chiefly British). See also break and dish.
divot
An indentation in the cloth of the table, especially at the foot spot where the apex ball is often tapped into secure position during racking. In extreme cases, the indentation may actually be in the slate bed of the table, from excessive tapping over many years, and can cause unexpected table rolls. A racking template is used to intentionally create minor divots for all of the balls in a rack.
dog

1. A widespread term in US parlance describing missing a relatively easy shot—often in the face of pressure. Can be used in many forms: "I dogged the shot"; "I hope he dogs it"; "I'm such a dog." See also choke, one-stroke.
2. Same as slop shot (chiefly Southern US, colloquial).
dots
In chiefly UK parlance, the non-striped ball group of a fifteen ball set that are numbered 1 through 7 and have a solid colour scheme. Compare solids, reds, low, small, little, spots, unders; contrast stripes.
double
Same as bank shot (chiefly British).
double century
Also double-century break. In English billiards, a break of 200–299 points (i.e. double a century). Larger multi-centuries are regularly achieved. Rare in amateur play, triple centuries are routine (and quadruples not uncommon) at World Professional Billiards Championships; 2007 winner Mike Russell shot four triples in the final round alone, while of sixteen competitors, three shot quadruple centuries (one once, one twice, and Russell three times). Quintuple centuries are rare even at the professional level, with only the 494 shot by nine-time world champion Russell (who has more such titles than any other player in history as of 2007) coming close in that event. As of 2007, Peter Gilchrist holds the world record, with a tredecuple century of 1346 consecutive points.
double cheeseburger, the
Same as hill-hill.
double-elimination

Also double elimination.

A tournament format in which a player must lose two matches in order to be eliminated. Contrast single-elimination.
double hit
An illegal shot (foul) in which the cue stick's tip contacts the cue ball twice during a single stroke. Double hits often occur when a player shoots the cue ball when it is very close to an object ball or cushion, because it is difficult to move the cue stick away quickly enough after the cue ball rebounds off the cushion or object ball.
double kiss
A situation in which two moving balls strike each other. Often happens when a ball strikes a second ball that is close to a rail, and it rebounds back into the first ball; usually but not always unintended.
double shimmed
A pool table where two shims have been placed on the sides of each pocket (in the jaws beneath the cloth), making the pockets "tighter" (smaller). Such tables are "tougher" than unshimmed or single-shimmed tables.
double the rail
Sometimes called a snake shot. A carom billiards shot, common in three-cushion billiards, where the cue ball is shot with reverse english at a relatively shallow angle down the rail, and spins backwards off the adjacent rail back into the first rail.
double the pocket
To intentionally rebound the cue ball off both of the pocket points to achieve position.
doubles
A form of team play in which two players compete against another team of two players in any given frame or match. In a doubles game, the first player from the breaking team is the only one who shoots during the opening inning, with control of the table passing to a member of the opposing team at the end of that inning, then upon the end of the opponent's inning to the doubles partner of the original player, and next to the second opponent, play proceeding in this doubly alternating manner until concluded. Also pairs (chiefly British). Contrast scotch doubles.
down-table
Toward the foot of the table.
drag shot
A shot played slowly and with heavy draw and follow-through so that the cue ball can be struck firmly but with a lot of the pace taken out, allowing more control than just a gentle tap that would travel as far. Also called "Drag Draw".
draw
1. Also known as back spin, a type of spin applied to the cue ball by hitting it below its equator, causing it to spin backwards even as it slides forward on the cloth. Back spin slows the cue ball down, reduces its travel, and narrows both the carom angle after contact with an object ball, and angle of reflection off a cushion. There are several variant terms for this, including "bottom" and "bottom spin" in the US and "screw" in the UK. Draw is thought to be the first spin technique understood by billiards players prior to the introduction of leather tips, and was in use by the 1790s. See illustration at spin.
2. The schedule of fixtures in a tournament.
draw shot
A shot in which the cue ball is struck below its equator with sufficient draw to make it reverse direction at the moment of contact with an object ball because it is still back-spinning. When the object and cue balls are lined up square, the reversal will be directly backwards, while on a cut shot, the effect will alter the carom angle. It can also refer to any shot to which draw is applied, as in "draw it off the foot rail just to the left of the center diamond". See illustration at spin.
drill
1. A set practice routine;
2. To beat badly; "I drilled my opponent."
3. In British terminology, a bank shot.
drop pockets
Netted or cupped pockets that do not return the balls to the foot end of the table by means of a gutter system or sloped surface beneath. Instead, they must instead be retrieved manually.
dry break
A break shot in pool on which zero object balls are potted.
duck
1. (noun): Derived from "sitting duck", usually referring to an object ball sitting close to a pocket or so positioned that is virtually impossible to miss. Same as hanger (US, colloquial), sitter (UK).
2. (verb): To intentionally play a safety.
dump
To intentionally lose a game, e.g. to disguise one's actual playing ability. An extreme form of sandbagging. See also hustle. See also Match fixing for the synonym "tank", used in sports more generally.
dump shot
A type of containing safety shot in snooker where the cue ball is played slowly up the table in order to "dump" it on the (usually) top cushion and leave the object ball safe.

== E ==
eight-ball
1. One of several games that arose around the beginning of the 20th century from pyramid pool. They have in common the use of a rack of fifteen object balls and a single cue ball, a hard break from behind the head string or baulk line, and a goal of pocketing (potting) all of one's own suit of balls then finally the black 8 ball. There are two main formalized versions of the game:
- eight-ball, an originally American and now internationally standardized professional version, also subject to competitive team play in numerous leagues. It is the most-played form of competition pool in the world, though not for professionals, among whom nine-ball dominates. Uses a set of striped and solid numbered balls. Ball-and-pocket are called for each shot, with fouls (faults) resulting in cue ball in-hand for the opponent, anywhere on the table.
- blackball a.k.a. British-style eight-ball pool, an originally British variant, also favoured in many Commonwealth countries, and parts of Continental Europe, with amateur and professional leagues. The two names reflect slightly variant rulesets, which differ primarily in handling of faults (fouls). Shots are not called. Uses a set of yellow and red balls. Pub pool usually consists of minor local variations on one of these two standardised rule sets.
Most forms of bar pool are variants of eight-ball, although rules may vary from venue to venue even within the same city. These variants arose primarily to drag out the game on coin-operated tables ("bar boxes"). In North America, many casual recreational players are unaware any other form of pool exists beyond bar pool.
2. A spelled-out name for the 8 ball.
end rail
Either of the two shorter rails of a billiards table. Compare short rail; contrast side/long rail.
english
Chiefly American: Also known as side spin, english (which is usually not capitalized) is spin placed on the cue ball when hit with the cue tip to the left or right of the ball's center. English has a marked effect on cue ball rebound angle off cushions (though not off object balls), and is thus crucial for gaining shape; it can also be used to "throw" an object ball slightly off its otherwise expected trajectory, to cheat the pocket, and for other effects. "English" is sometimes used more inclusively, to colloquially also refer to follow and draw. In combination one could say bottom-right English, or like the face of a clock (4 o'clock English). The British and Irish do not use this term, instead preferring "side". See illustration at spin.
english-induced throw
Same as spin-induced throw. See throw for details.
equator
The horizontal plane directly in the center of the cue ball, which when hit exactly by the cue tip should impart no follow or draw.
escape
A successful attempt to get out of a snooker.
extension
1.

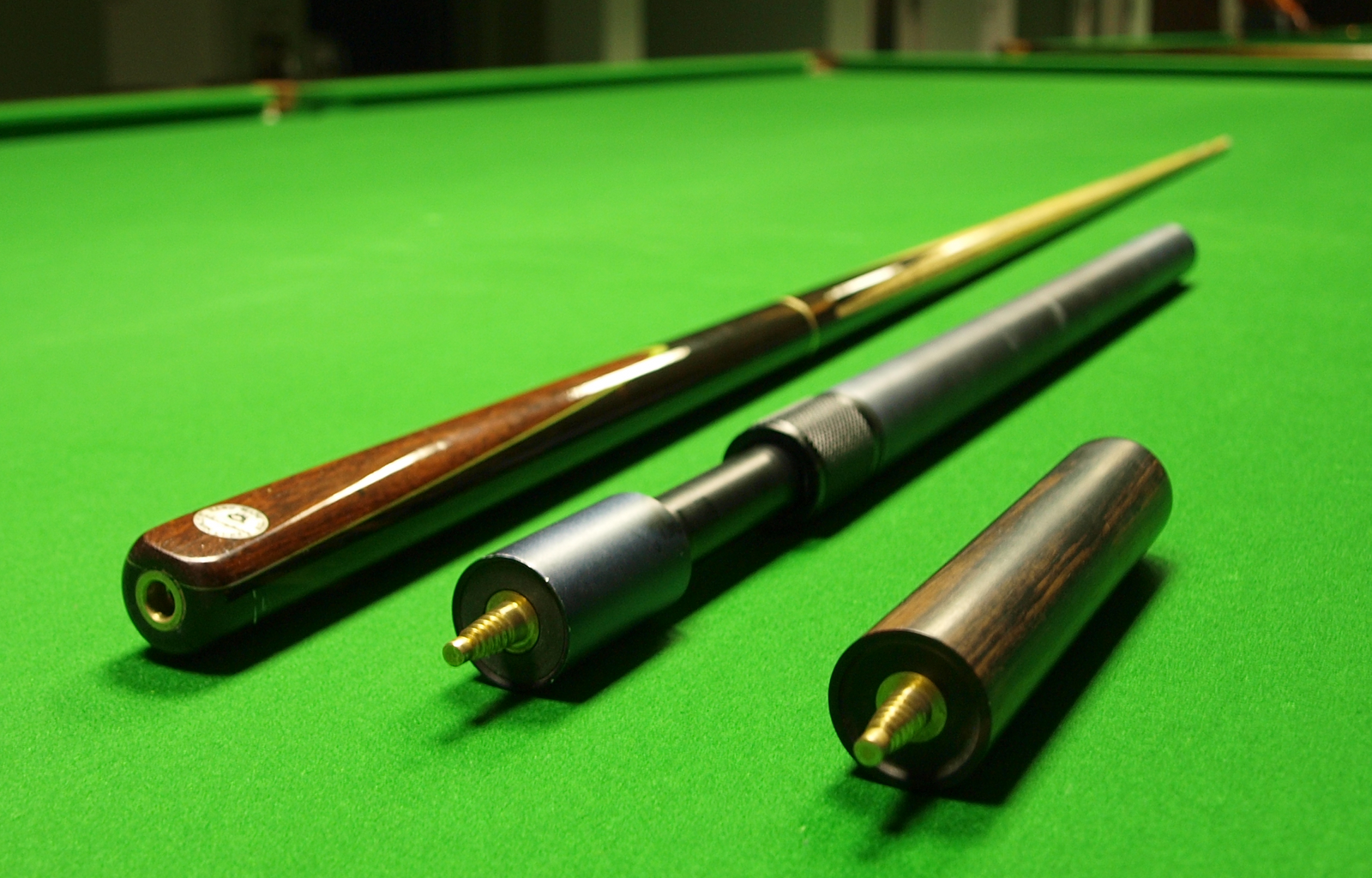
A snooker cue with two attachable extensions

Any mechanical aid that serves to extend the length of the player's cue, normally added to the end of the butt either by clipping around the end or screwing into the base. Though extensions are used for pool, it is more common in snooker because of the significantly larger table size.
2. In a tournament where players get limited time to make their shots (common in televised matches), an extension is extra time granted before making a shot; players have a limited number of extensions in each frame.

== F ==
face
Also cushion face. The protrusion of the playing edge of the cushion from the rail over the bed of the table. The furthest-protruding point of the face is known as the nose of the cushion. The playing area of the table is the space between the faces (technically, the noses) of the cushions.
facing

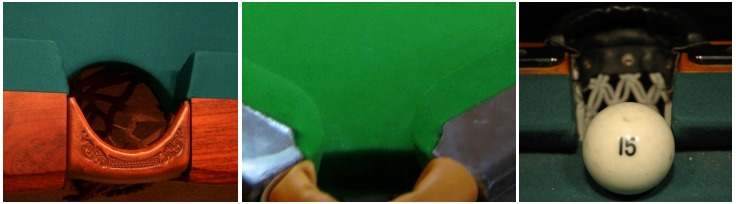
A comparison of the pocket facings of (left to right): an American pool table (side pocket); a British-style snooker table (corner pocket); and a Russian pyramid table (side pocket)

The facings of a pocket are the portions of the rail cushions that line the jaws of the pocket. Facings vary widely by game. Pool facings are flat and angled rather wide, on pockets notably larger than the balls, to act much like the backboard in basketball, in that a shot can be directed into the facing to cause it to angle off the facing into the pocket. They are reinforced with plastic shims between the cushion rubber and the cloth, to reduce wear and tear. Snooker facings are curved and not angled, providing a smooth transition between the rails and the pockets, which are not much wider than the balls, thus preventing any backboard effect (snooker shots must be almost perfectly straight in). The facings in Russian billiards are even more challenging, being straight and angled inward rather than outward, which results in the knuckles of the pocket, barely wide enough to accept a ball, rejecting any but the most accurate shots.
fall
1. Verb, passive, intransitive: For a ball to be pocketed. "The 8 ball fell early, so the game was over quickly."
2. Noun: The curved edge cut into the table bed at which the hole of the pocket actually begins inside the pocket jaws. The fall may be a sheer drop, as on tournament-standard snooker tables, or have a beveled, down-sloping rim, as on pool tables. A ball is, of course, much more likely to hang when there is no bevel. How far into the pocket the fall begins is one factor that determines "pocket speed" or difficulty.
fast
1. Describes a billiard table with tightly woven and broken-in (but clean) cloth (baize), upon which the balls move quicker and farther. See table speed for more information.
2. Producing lively action; said of cushions or of the balls, in addition to the above, cloth-related definition.
3. Unusually accepting of balls; said of pockets; see pocket speed (sense 1) for more information. "Slow" is the direct opposite of "fast" in all of these usages.
fat
See undercut.
fault
Same as foul (chiefly British, and declining in usage; even the WPA and WEFP blackball rules use "foul").
feather
Also feather shot. A very thin cut shot in which the cue ball just brushes the edge of an object ball. "Feather" by itself can be both noun and verb (e.g. "feathering the ball"). See also snick.
felt
Same as cloth (deprecated; it is factually incorrect, for felt is a completely different kind of cloth from baize).
ferrule
A sleeve, permanently fitted onto the lathed-down tip end of the cue, made from fiberglass, phenolic resin, brass, titanium, ivory, horn or antler, melamine, plastic, or other rigid material, upon which the cue tip is mounted and which protects the shaft wood from splitting due to impact with the cue ball.
firewood
Common slang in the U.S. for a cheap, poorly made cue. Compare wood.
fish
1. An easy mark;
2. A person who loses money gambling and keeps coming back for more;
3. Sometimes, a poor player;
4. As a verb, either to hit the balls hard with no intention in mind other than to get lucky and perhaps scatter the balls a bit more ("hit-and-hope"), or to shoot hard at the money ball with the same intention ("smash-and-pray"). Compare slop and fluke; contrast mark (sense 3) and call.
flagrant foul
A foul where the rules are blatantly, intentionally violated; in contexts where this qualifies as unsportsmanlike conduct, a stiffer penalty may apply (e.g. loss of frame) than normal for a foul.
flat-back pack
In snooker, a situation during a frame in which the first line of the remaining reds grouped together, where the original pack was, are in a straight horizontal line. This has implications when opening the pack, as a full-ball contact off the top cushion will usually cause the cue-ball to stick to the red and fail to develop a potting opportunity.
fluke
A shot that has an ostensibly positive outcome for the player, although it was not what the player intended. Examples of flukes include an unexpected pot off several cushions or other balls having missed the pocket aimed for, or a lucky safety position after having missed a shot. Many players are apologetic after a fluke. In many games, flukes result in a loss of turn, although some rule sets (most notably those of snooker, nine-ball and related games, and the eight-ball rules of the American Poolplayers Association and its affiliates) count flukes as valid, point-making shots. Compare fish and slop; contrast mark (sense 3) and call.
follow
The forward rotation of the cue ball that results from a follow shot. Also known as top spin or top, follow is applied to the cue ball by hitting it above its equator, causing it to spin more rapidly in the direction of travel than it would spin by merely rolling on the cloth from a center-ball hit. Follow speeds the cue ball up, and widens both the carom angle after contact with an object ball, and angle of reflection off a cushion. See illustration at spin.
follow shot
A shot in which the cue ball is struck above its equator with sufficient top spin to cause the cue ball to travel forward after it contacts an object ball. When a cue ball with follow on it contacts an object ball squarely (a center-to-center hit), the cue ball travels directly forward through the space previously occupied by the object ball (and can sometimes even be used to pocket a second ball). By contrast, on a cut shot, a cue ball with follow on it will first travel on the tangent line after striking the object ball, and then arc forward, widening the carom angle. See illustration at spin.
follow-through
On a shot, the extension of the cue stick through the cue ball position during the end of a player's stroke in the direction originally aimed.
foot
Chiefly American: The half of the table in which the object balls are racked (in games in which racked balls are used). This usage is conceptually opposite that in British English, where this end of the table is called the top. Contrast head.
foot cushion
Chiefly American: The cushion on the foot rail. Compare top cushion; contrast head cushion.
foot rail
Chiefly American: The short rail at the foot of the table. Frequently used imprecisely, to mean foot cushion. Compare top rail; contrast head rail.
foot spot
The point on the table surface over which the apex ball of a rack is centered (in most games). It is the point half the distance between the long rails' second diamonds from the end of the racking end of the table. The foot spot is the intersection of the foot string and the long string, and is typically marked with a cloth or paper decal on pool tables. Contrast head spot.
foot string
An imaginary line running horizontally across a billiards table from the second diamond (from the foot end of the table) on one long rail to the corresponding second diamond on the other long rail. The foot string intersects the long string at the foot spot. It is rarely drawn on the table.
forced shot
Same as cheating the pocket. Principally used in snooker.
force follow
A powerful follow shot with a high degree of top spin on it; usually when the object ball being hit is relatively close to the cue ball and is being hit very full; also known as "prograde top spin" or "prograde follow" (when referring to the action on the shot rather than the shot per se), and as a "jenny" in Australia.
forward spin
Same as follow (top spin).
foul

A violation of a particular game's rules for which a set penalty is imposed. In many pool games the penalty for a foul is ball-in-hand anywhere on the table for the opponent. In some games such as straight pool, a foul results in a loss of one or more points. In one-pocket, in which a set number of balls must be made in a specific pocket, upon a foul the player must return a ball to the table. In some games, three successive fouls in a row brings the loss of a game. In straight pool, a third successive foul results in a loss of 16 points (15 plus one for the foul).

Possible foul situations (non-exhaustive):

- The player shoots the cue ball first into a ball that is not an object ball;
- The player shoots and after contacting an object ball, no ball is pocketed and neither the cue ball nor a numbered ball contacts a cushion (excepting push out rules);
- The player pockets the cue ball (see scratch);
- The player does not have at least one foot on the floor at the moment of shooting;
- The player shoots the cue ball before all other balls have come to a complete stop;
- The player hits the cue ball more than once during a shot (a double hit);
- The player touches the cue ball with something other than the tip of the cue;
- The player touches any ball other than the cue ball;
- The player causes a ball to leave the table's playing surface without it returning (e.g., jumping a ball off the table);
- The player marks the table in any manner to aid in aiming;
- The player who has ball-in-hand, touches an object ball with the cue ball while attempting to place the cue ball on the table;
- The player shoots in such a manner that his cue tip stays in contact with the cue ball for more than the momentary time commensurate with a stroked shot (a push shot).
frame
A term for each rack from the break off until a clearance, losing foul or concession has been made. A match is made up of several frames. See also game (sense 1), which has a slightly broader meaning.
frame ball
In snooker, the ball that, if potted, will leave the trailing player requiring snookers.
free ball

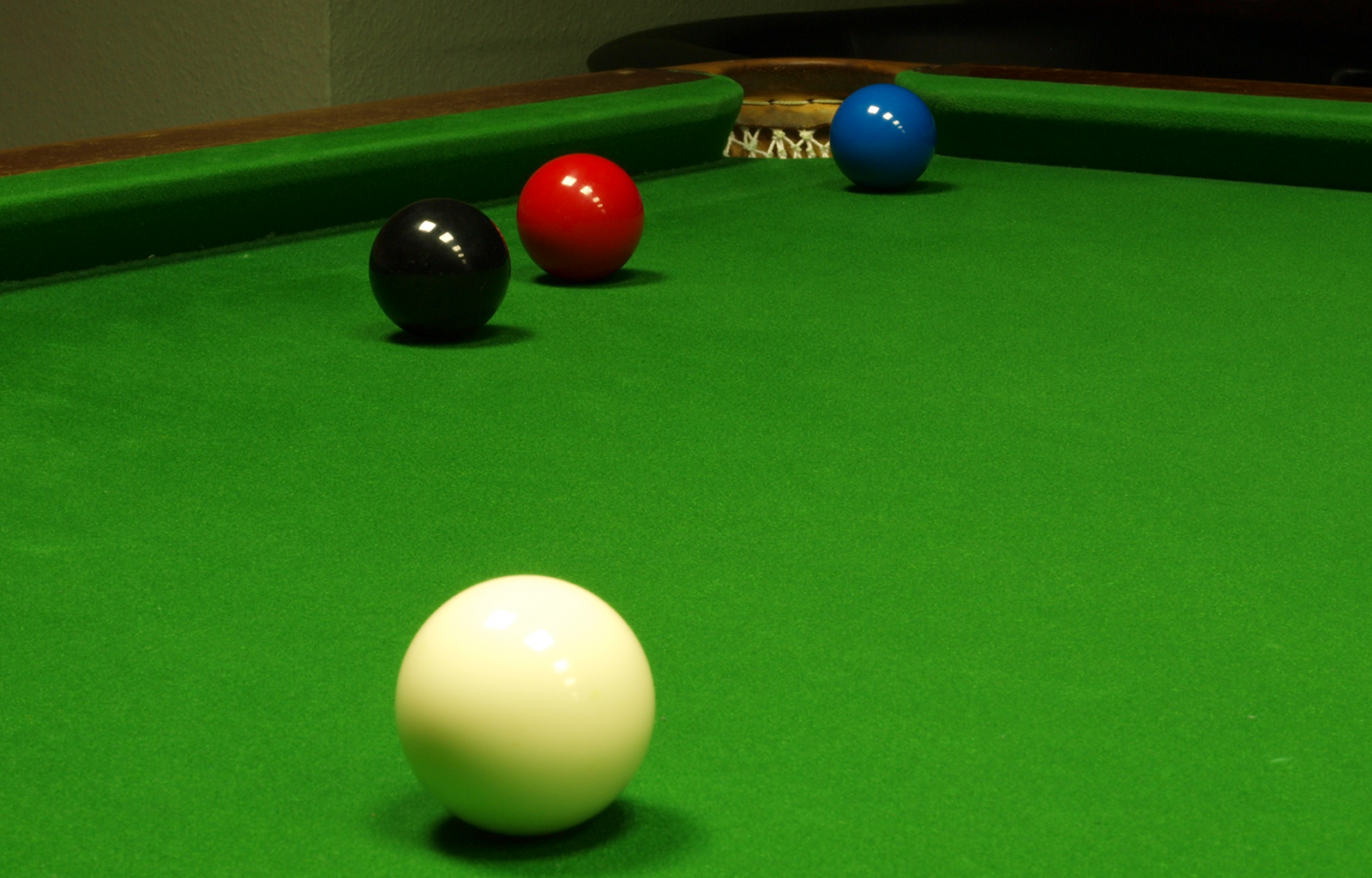
Freeball situation: red is snookered, blue can be called.

Also free shot. A situation where a player has fouled, leaving the opponent snookered. In UK eight-ball this would normally give the opponent the option of one of two plays: (1) ball-in-hand with two shots; (2) being allowed to contact, or even pot, a ball other than one from their set from the snookered position (although the black may not be potted), with the loss of the first shot. In addition, some variations of the game allow the player to pot one of the opposition's balls, on the first visit only, without the loss of a "free shot".

In snooker, a free ball is awarded if a player, after a foul by their opponent, is left in a position where they cannot strike both extreme edges of the object ball (or a cluster of touching balls). It gives the player the option to nominate any other ball as the ball-on, potting it for the same number of points. A player may not lay a snooker behind the ball nominated as a free ball unless only the pink and black are left on the table. Receiving a free ball while all 15 reds remain on the table makes possible a 16-red clearance as well as a break exceeding 147.
free stroking
1. Potting well and quickly but without much thought for position play.
2. Playing loose and carefree.
3. Same as dead stroke.
freeze up
To dedicate a set amount of money that a gambling match will be played to; no one may quit until one player or the other has won the "frozen up" funds.
frozen
Chiefly American: A resting ball that is in actual contact with a cushion or with one or more other balls is said to be "frozen" (or, colloquially, "froze") to that cushion or the touching ball(s). (For frozen combination/combo, frozen kiss, etc., that is almost impossible to miss, see the more common variants under dead). The chiefly British "tight" is equivalent to "frozen", but only applied to frozen/tight to a cushion, not to another ball. For situations in which the cue ball is frozen to an object ball, different rule sets have different approaches. In some, the cue ball must be addressed with the cue at an angle at least 45 degrees divergent from an imaginary line running through the center of the balls, to minimize chances of a push shot. In snooker (and some British pool rules), this is called a touching ball, and the cue ball must be shot away from the object ball without the latter moving.
full
Also full-ball. A type of contact between two balls from which no or little angle is created between their paths; the contact required to pot a straight shot. It is commonly used in reference to how much of an object ball a player can see with the cue ball: "Can you hit that full?".
fundamentals
The basic actions necessary to shoot well: stance, grip, stroke, bridge, and follow-through.

== G ==
game
1. Play, from the opening break shot until one player has won (or the game has been halted for some reason by a referee). Games are the units that make up matches, races (in some senses of that term) and rounds. Essentially the same as frame, except with regards to straight pool, which is a multi-rack game.
2. An identifiable, codifiable set of rules. Pool is not a game, but a class of games. Nine-ball is a game.
3. There are also slang usages, such as "to have game" (to be a good player, as in "he['s] got game") and "to be game" (to be willing to play or to gamble, as in "yeah, I'm game, so let's see what you've got"). But these usages are not particular to cue sports.
game ball
The ball required to win the rack. See also money ball.
games on the wire
To give a handicap to an opponent where they have to win a specified number fewer games than the other player in order to triumph in the match. The name refers to posting games on the scorekeeping mechanism known as a wire or scoring string, though the phrase may still be employed when no actual use of the particular device is available or intended.
gapper
An agreement between two players in a tournament, one of whom will advance to a guaranteed money prize if the match is won, to give a certain percentage of that money to the loser of the match. Also known as a saver.
gather shot
In the carom games, any shot where the result is all the balls near each other; ideally, in position for the start of a nurse on the next stroke.
gearing outside english
Also outside gearing english, etc.: Precise application of outside english to counter the effects of throw (deflection of the object ball from its expected tangent line path), by applying counter-sidespin in the direction opposite to that which would increase the friction- and rolling-curve deflection of the object ball from the desired path. Gearing spin can also be used as a hedge to minimize the effects of imminently predicted cling (also known as skid or, in British and especially snooker terminology, kick). "Gearing" outside english is not a type or style of outside spin, but a subjectively judged amount of it – enough to cause the cue ball rotation to affect the object ball's rotation in a desired way through momentarily prolonged contact, like two gears interacting. This is relative to specific playing conditions, including the shot angle and force, whether other compensation mechanisms are being used such slit over-cutting to thwart throw, and the cleanliness condition of the balls. The term gearing outside english is technical jargon rather than player slang; it was introduced by billiards-focused physicist and mechanical engineer David G. Alciatore in the 2000s. See throw for additional information.
general average
Abbreviation: GA. In carom billiards, the number that indicates the overall relation between the points and innings (points ÷ innings = GA) a player has made throughout the whole tournament. E.g., 125 points in 56 innings is a GA of 2.232. Higher numbers indicate better players. See also special average.
gentlemen's call
Also gentleman's call. An informal approach to the "call-everything" variation of call-shot, common in bar pool. Obvious shots, such as a straight-on or near-straight shot for which the shooter is clearly aiming and which could not be mistaken for another shot, need not be called. Bank shots, kicks, caroms and combinations are usually less obvious and generally must be called, though this may depend upon the mutual skill level and shot selection perception of the players. An opponent has the right to ask what the shooter's intention is, if this is unclear.
ghost ball
A common aiming method in which a phantom ball is imagined frozen to the object ball at the point where an imaginary line drawn between their centers is aimed at the desired target; the center of cue ball may then be shot at the center of the "ghost" ball (i.e., to precisely take the place of where that ball is imagined to be) and, ideally, impact the object ball at the proper contact point. The ghost-ball method of aiming results in misses where adjustment is not made for collision-induced throw.
go off
Describes the propensity of a player losing small sums of money at gambling to suddenly sharply increase the stakes; often continuing to lose until broke. Compare Chasing one's money. Sandbagging and pretending to "go off" (only to handily win the raised-stakes bet) is a classic hustling technique; see also on the lemonade.
gold ball
In professional snooker, a non-standard additional colour ball, worth 20 points, that was first introduced at the 2024 World Masters of Snooker. Placed at the centre of the baulk cushion at the start of a frame, the gold ball may be potted only after a player completes a maximum break, extending a 147 break to 167. As soon as a maximum break is no longer possible, the referee removes the gold ball from the table. At tournaments featuring the gold ball, prizes up to $1,000,000 have been offered for potting it.
golden break
In nine-ball a break shot that pots the 9 ball without fouling, in which case the player wins in one shot. Some tournaments also apply similar rules to the money ball in other games. See also on the snap.
golden duck
When potting both the cue ball and money ball on the break results in an automatic loss of frame. A non-standard rule, it is nonetheless used in some professional events.
goose neck
Also goose-neck rest. Same as swan.
grapefruit
Colloquial term for an unusually large, heavy cue ball made of the same phenolic resin or other modern, resilient plastic as the object balls. "Grapefruit" cue balls are frequently found on older coin-operated bar tables that do not have magnetic ball-return mechanisms. As with excessively dense, ceramic "rock" cue balls, the ball return works because the cue ball is considerably heavier than, and thereby distinguishable from, the object balls. Unlike "rocks", grapefruit balls are not prone to excessive equipment wear and tear. But because of their unusually large size, they have a very strong effect on the tangent line and thus on the accuracy of cut shots. Their weight also has a notable effect on play, as they are somewhat more difficult to draw (screw), stop and stun compared to standard and magnetic cue balls, but not to the extent of the much less resilient rock balls. Like rocks, grapefruits do generate a large amount of smash-through.
green
1. Nearly table-length distance between the cue ball and target object ball, or between an object ball and target pocket, i.e. a potentially difficult shot due to distance ("you sure left me a lot of green on that one")
2. The cloth covering the table ("oh no, you just ripped the green")
3. The green ball ("that was a great shot on the green")
4. Money ("I won a lot of green last night from that wannabe hustler")
green ball
Also the green. In snooker, the colour ball that is worth three points, being the second-least valuable colour behind the yellow. It is one of the baulk colours, and is placed on the green spot. In some (especially American) snooker ball sets, it is numbered "3" on its surface.
green spot
The spot (usually not specially marked because it is obvious) on a snooker table at which the green ball is placed. Regardless of table size, it is the intersection of the "D" and the baulk line on the breaker's left side. The left-to-right order of the green, brown and yellow balls is the subject of the mnemonic phrase "God bless you".
green pocket
In snooker, the corner pocket that is closest to the green spot.
grip
1. The way in which a player holds the butt end of the cue stick.
2. The wrap of the cuestick where the hand is placed, also known as the "grip area."
group
Same as suit, predominantly in British terminology, i.e., in eight-ball either of the set of seven balls (reds or yellows) that must be cleared before potting the black. Generally used in the generic, especially in rulesets or articles, rather than colloquially by players.
gully table
1. A table with a ball return system, as opposed to a drop pocket table.
2. Also gutter table. Same as bar table.

== H ==
half-ball hit

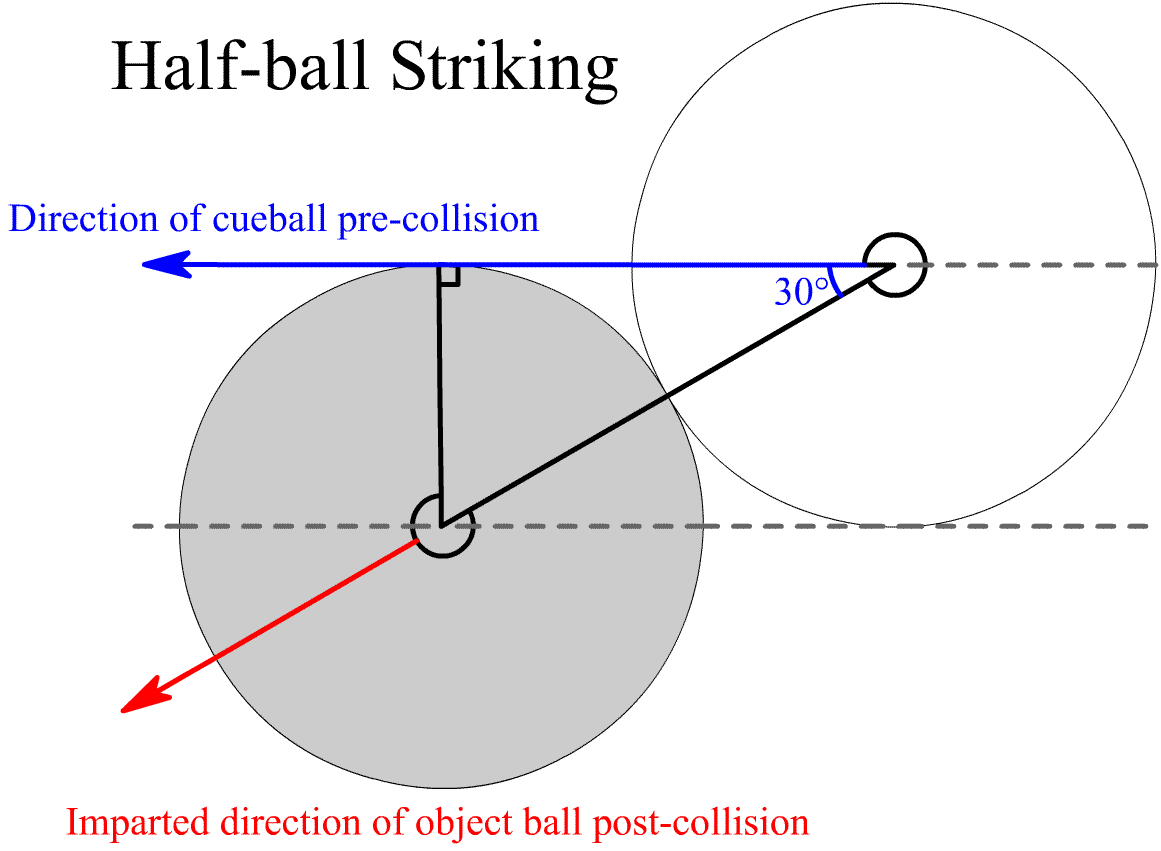
Half-ball striking

A shot aimed so that the center of the cue ball is in line with the edge of the object ball, eclipsing half of the ball. "Hit it just a little thinner than half-ball." Assuming a cling does not occur, the shot will impart post-contact momentum on the object ball in a direction 30° (which is $\arcsin(1-x)$, where $x$ is the fraction of object ball eclipsed: 1/2 in this case) off the direction of the cue-ball's pre-contact momentum. Also notable because the carom angle the cue ball takes is more consistent than at other contact points.
half-butt
In snooker and English billiards, a rest that is approximately 3 metres long and used with a cue of about the same length, used for shots that cannot be reached with normal rests and cues.
half-century
In snooker and other British usages, a break of between 50 and 99 points (100 points or more being called a century), which requires potting at least 12 consecutive balls (e.g. the last three reds with at least two blacks and a pink, followed by all the colours).
hail Mary
Chiefly American; same as hit and hope. A term borrowed from a similar idea in American football.
hand chalk
A misnomer for hand talc.
handicapping
Modification of the rules and/or scoring of a game to enable players of variable abilities to compete on a more even playing field. Examples of handicapping include spotting balls and giving games on the wire to an opponent. In league play, common forms of handicapping include awarding compensating points to a lesser-skilled team, or using numerical player ranking systems to adjust final scores between opponents of different skill levels. A player's handicap is such a numerical rank. See Handicapping main article for more general information on sports handicapping.
hang
Said of a ball, to come to rest partially over the edge of a pocket's fall but still resting on the table bed. Because of ball curvature, if the very bottom of the ball is not over the sharp rim or beveled slope (depending on table type) of the pocket's fall, the ball will not drop into the pocket. As much as approximately 49% of a ball's diameter can be hanging over the sharp drop of a standard snooker table fall, but considerably less on a typical pool table, with beveled falls. A ball hanging in the pocket – a "hanger" – is nearly unmissable (though fouling by scratching the cue ball into the pocket right after the object ball is a common mistake). Can be used in a transitive sense in reference to player action: "You hung that one right on the edge".
hanger
1. An easily shot object ball that is "hanging" in the pocket.
2. By extension, any extremely easy shot, even in carom billiards which has no pockets.
have the nuts
Be in a game where either because of disparity in skill level, or because of a handicap given, it would be very difficult to lose.
having the cue ball on a string
Used when describing perfect cue ball position play.
hazard
1. Literally, a pocket, but generally used in the phrases losing hazard – potting (pocketing) the cue ball off another ball – and winning hazard – using the cue ball to pot another ball – the two types of legal shots that pocket balls in games in which the term is used at all, which is very few today. The term principally survives in English billiards, in which both types of shots are point-scoring. Formerly, a large number of different games made use of the two types of hazards as point scorers or losers in various ways (thus their suggestive names). The term ultimately derives from holes or pockets in the table to be avoided, in very early forms of billiards.
2. In golf billiards, an area of the table (sometimes marked) that a player will be penalized for entering if their ball does not leave. Derives from the use of the term in the outdoor game of golf.
head
Chiefly American: The half of the table from which the break shot is taken. This usage is conceptually opposite that in British English, where this end of the table is called the bottom. Contrast foot. See also kitchen.
head cushion
Chiefly American: The cushion on the head rail. Compare bottom cushion; contrast foot cushion.
head rail
Chiefly American: The short rail at the head of the table. Traditionally this is the rail on which the table manufacturer's logo appears. Compare bottom rail, baulk rail; contrast foot rail, top rail.
head spot
The intersection of the head string and long string, which is usually not marked on a table with a spot decal or other mark, unlike the foot spot, though some pool halls mark both spots so that racking can be done at either end of the table, and wear on the cloth from racking and breaking is more evenly distributed. Compare baulk spot.
head string
A line, sometimes imaginary (especially in American pool), sometimes drawn on the cloth, that runs horizontally across the table from the second diamond (from the head rail) on one long rail to the corresponding second diamond on the other long rail. In most pool games, the opening break shot must be performed with the center (base) of the cue ball behind the head string (i.e. between the head string and head rail). The head string intersects the long string at the head spot, and delimits the kitchen (and, in European nine-ball, the outer boundary of the break box). The head string's position is always determined by the diamonds, in contrast to the similar but different baulk line, the position of which is determined by measurement from the bottom cushion (head cushion).
heads up
Same as straight up.
heart
The strength of a player's will to win; the ability to overcome pressure; "he showed a lot of heart in making that comeback."
high
1. Also highs, high balls, high ones. In eight-ball and related games, to be shooting the striped suit (group) of balls (9 through 15); "you're high balls" or "I've got the highs" ("you're high" is rare, because of the "intoxication" ambiguity). Compare stripes, yellows, big ones, overs; contrast low.
2. With follow, as in "I shot that high left", meaning "I shot that with follow and with left english". Derives from the fact that one must aim above the cue ball's equator, i.e. "high" on the ball, to impart follow. "With" is optional (e.g. "I shot that with high left" or "I shot that high left"). Contrast low.
3. In snooker, same as "above", as in "she'll want to finish high on the black to allow position on the red".
4. With run (UK: break), a lengthy series of successful shots; see high run, high break.
high break
UK: Essentially the same as high run, but applied to snooker and by extension to pool, especially blackball pool: A break (series of successful pots) running into large numbers for that player's skill level.
high run

A series of successful shots (a run) that is lengthy for the player's skill level. The exact implication is dependent upon context, e.g. "my high run at three-cushion is 15", "Jones had the highest run of the tournament", "that was a pretty high run you just did", etc. Used congratulatorily, it may be phrased "good run", "great run", "nice run", etc. See also high break.
hill
See on the hill, hill-hill.
hill-hill
The point in match play where both players (or teams) need only one more game (frame) victory to win the match or race. See also on the hill, rubber match.
hit and hope
A shot in which the player is relying on luck for a favorable outcome, because no better shot seems to exist. Compare hail Mary, and smash and pray.
ho
Also ho ball(s). An exhortatory cry to a ball or balls to slow down or come to a stop, often made when overshooting position with the cue ball.
hold the spot
In snooker, to leave the cue ball ball on the spot of a colour ball after potting it. This is usually performed where re-spotting of the colour ball would cause positional problems for the player, such as blocking available pots on one or more red balls.
hook
1. Same as snooker (verb)
2. Same as hook rest.
hook rest
Also the hook. In snooker, a type of mechanical bridge that has only since the 2010s been endorsed by the WPBSA to allow its use in major tournament play. It is a normal rest with the head in line with the shaft, but the last foot or so of the shaft is curved. This allows players to position the curved end around an obstructing ball that would have otherwise left them hampered on the cue ball and in need of a spider or swan with extensions, which would have less control.
horn
Same as knuckle. By analogy to animal horns, not the musical instruments.
hot seat
Position at the end of the winner bracket in a double-elimination tournament, waiting to face the winner of the loser's bracket in the finals.
house
1. The venue in which the game is being played, e.g. a snooker hall, pool bar, etc.
2. The kitchen or baulk area of a Russian billiards table; from Russian: дома, romanized: doma, lit. 'house'.
house cue
Usually a one-piece cue freely available for use by patrons in bars/pubs and pool halls.
house man
A pool room employee who plays with a good degree of skill.
house rack
A pejorative term for an improper rack in which the balls are not properly in contact with their neighbors, often resulting in a poor spread on the break.
house rules
The rules played in a particular venue not necessarily in comportment with official rules, or with common local bar pool custom.
hug the rail
Describes a ball rolling along a rail in contact or near contact with it, or making multiple successive contacts with the rail. See velcro.
hustle
To play for money and lull a victim into thinking they can win, prompting them to accept higher and higher stakes, until beating them and walking off with more money than they would have been willing to bet had they been beaten soundly in the beginning. The terms hustler, for one who hustles, and hustling, describing the act, are just as common if not more so than this verb form. See also sandbag, on the lemonade, lemonade stroke, shark, dump.

== I ==
illegal
As in many other sports, "illegal" means causing or likely to cause a foul (the opposite being legal). (See legal for specific examples of usage.)
in-hand
1. Shortening of ball-in-hand.
2. In snooker, the ability to place the cue ball anywhere inside the boundaries of the D. This occurs at the start of a frame, and after the cue ball has been potted or forced off the table.
inning
A player's (or doubles team's) turn at the table, usually ending with a failure to score a point or to pocket a ball, depending on the game, a foul, a safety or with a win. In some games, such as five-pins and killer, a player's inning is always limited to one shot, regardless of the intent and result of the shot. Usually synonymous with visit, except in scotch doubles format. The term is sometimes used to mean both players'/teams' visits combined, e.g. when referring to the inning in which a memorable shot occurred.
in-off
(Chiefly British.) In snooker, English billiards, and blackball/eight-ball pool, an instance where the cue ball has been potted (pocketed) after contacting an object ball. It is a fault (foul) in most games. In English billiards it is a common method of scoring. There is no equivalent (current) American term for this specific means of pocketing the white ball. Compare losing hazard, scratch.
in-or-over shot
(Chiefly British.) In a snookers required situation in snooker, a shot played by the player defending the lead, where they play the object ball in such a way as to try to slowly pot (pocket) it, so that if it misses, at least it is over the pocket and difficult to obtain the required snooker from.
inside english
(Chiefly U.S.) Side spin (english) placed on the same side of the cue ball as the direction in which the object ball is being cut (left-hand english when cutting a ball to the left, and vice versa). In addition to affecting cue ball position, inside english can increase throw.
in sight
(Chiefly British) Said of an object ball that can easily be reached by the cue ball, or of a pocket that can easily be reached by a selected object ball, usually directly (i.e. without intervening kick, bank, carom, kiss or combination shots). Compare see.
in stroke
Cueing and timing the balls well; in good form, where pocketing (potting), safety and clarity of thinking seem to come easily. A player who had not been doing well but then suddenly picks up (as happens during the course of many matches) may be said to catch a stroke. See also stroke.
insurance ball
A ball that is easily made from many positions on the table but which is left untouched while the rack is played, so that in the event the player gets out of position, the shooter has an insurance shot. Typically an insurance ball will be in or near the jaws of a pocket.
intentional foul
Also intentional fault; same as deliberate foul.
in the balls
In snooker, a phrase used to describe a situation in which the player has an easy pot and where in general the balls are in a position to go on to make a sizeable break. Compare set up (sense 4).
in the chair
in a two-person game, the non-shooting player is referred to as being "in the chair". This terminology likely originates from the fact that many high level billiards events require the non-shooting player to sit in a designated chair while their opponent is at the table.
in the money
In a tournament, to place high enough to receive a payout. E.g., in a tournament that pays from 1st down to 5th places, to be at least 5th place is to be in the money.
in turn
When a particular ball is given as a handicap in nine-ball, designating that ball in turn means that it must be made in rotation, when it is the lowest numerical ball remaining on the table, and cannot be made to garner a win earlier in the game by way of a combination, carom or any other shot. For example, if a player is spotted the 8 ball, they only win by making that ball after balls 1 through 7 have been cleared from the table. The phrase is not common in the U.S.
Irish linen
Linen made from flax, and produced in Ireland, which is often used to wrap the gripping area of the butt of a cue.

== J ==
jack up
1. To elevate the back of the cue on a shot.
2. In gambling, to "jack up a bet" means to increase the stakes.
jail
When a player is on the receiving end of a devastating safety where it is very difficult, or near impossible, to make a legal hit on an object ball.
jam up
Adjectival expression for a player's deadly game; "watch out, she plays jam up."
jawed ball
A ball that fails to drop into a pocket after bouncing back and forth between the jaws of a pocket.
jaws
The inside walls of a pocket, from the facings to the drop hole.
jenny
Chiefly Australian: Same as a force follow shot.
jigger
Same as cross.
joint
The interlocking connection between the butt and shaft ends of a two-piece cue stick. Usually connects via means of a steel or wooden pin, and may be protected by a collar of metal or some other material, or may connect wood-on-wood.
joint protectors
Plugs that screw into the joint when a two-piece cue is broken down to keep foreign objects and moisture from contacting the joint mechanism.
jump
Also jump shot. Any shot where the cue ball is intentionally jumped into the air to clear an obstacle (usually an object ball, even in games with non-ball objects, e.g. bottle pool). Jump shots must be performed by hitting the cue ball into the table's surface so that it rebounds off the cloth; scooping under the cue ball to fling it into the air is deemed a foul by all authoritative rules sources. A legal jump shot works by compressing the cue ball slightly against the slate under the cloth, causing it to spring upward when the downward pressure of the cue is released. Some billiard halls and even entire leagues prohibit all jump (and usually also massé) shots, out of fears of damage to the equipment, especially the cloth. Specialized jump cues exist to better facilitate jump shots; they are usually shorter and lighter, and with harder tips, than normal cues. Jump shots that go through or into objects rather than over them are common in trick shot (artistic pool and artistic billiards) competition.
jump cue
Also jump stick. A cue dedicated to jumping balls; usually shorter and lighter than a playing cue and having a wider, harder tip.
jump draw
A rare and very difficult trick jump shot that turns into a draw shot upon landing. Requires precise application of spin in addition to the precise application of ball pressure to effectuate the jump. Jump draws are fairly often seen in professional trick shot competition.
jump massé
A rare and extremely difficult trick jump shot that turns into a massé upon landing. Requires very precise application of spin in addition to the precise application of ball pressure to effectuate the jump.

== K ==
key ball
The object ball involved in a key shot.
key shot
1. A shot or ball that allows a player to obtain shape on another ball hard to play position to.
2. A shot or ball that is the "key" to running out.
3. The 14th object ball in a rack of straight pool that, when proper position is achieved on, allows easy position play, in turn, on the last (15th) object ball for an intergame break shot.
kick
1. Short for kick shot. Also used as a verb, "to kick [at]" (US).
2. Same as cling (US) and skid. Chiefly British: Exaggerated deflection of ball trajectories on impact, generally due to cue chalk stuck on one of the balls. Kick is the bane of snooker players, even at top professional levels, and is why they so frequently ask a referee to clean a ball. Because of the comparatively light weight of snooker balls, and much smaller margins of error due to tight pocket sizes on a very large table, the throw effect of a kick can cause a seemingly easy snooker shot to miss widely. Even if the kick was mostly vertical, due to screw (bottom spin) or follow (top spin) rather than side spin, and the shot was potted, a kick often results in balls visibly jumping upon impact, resulting in a great loss of cue ball momentum, which can wreck the shot's position play and leave the player with poor options. On even medium-distance shots, however, an outright miss is more likely. Noun, verb, and rare adjective usage as per "cling". (See cling for less snooker-specific notes.)
kick shot
A shot in which the cue ball is driven to one or more rail or cushions before reaching its intended target—usually an object ball. Often shortened to "kick" in North American usage, though this word by itself has a very different meaning in British usage (see entry above, sense 2).
kill shot
Also kill. A shot intended to slow down or "kill" the cue ball's speed as much as possible after contact with an object ball; usually a shot with draw, often combined with inside english. Also known as a dead ball shot.
kiss
An instance of contact between balls, usually used in the context of describing an object ball contacting another object ball (e.g. "the 2 ball kissed off the 12 ball"), or in snooker the cue ball making contact with some object ball after the initial contact with a ball on. If the player's intention was to cause two object balls to kiss (e.g. to pocket a shot ball by ricocheting it off a stationary one), it is often called a kiss shot. Compare double kiss; contrast carom.
kiss shot
A shot in which the object is to pocket (pot) an object ball by striking it with the cue ball and then having the object ball ricochet off another object ball into a pocket.
kitchen
The area on the table behind the head string. The origin of the term has been the subject of some speculation but the best explanation known is that in the 1800s, many homes did not have room for both a billiard table and a dining room table. The solution was a billiards table that had a cover converting it into a dining table. Kept in the dining room, play on such a table was often restricted by the size of the room, so it would be placed so that the head rail would face the connected kitchen door, thus affording a player room for the backswing without hitting a wall. A player was therefore either half or sometimes fully (literally) "in the kitchen" when breaking the balls. See also baulk.
knuckle
One of two jutting points or curves of the noses of the cushions on either side of each pocket where cushion and pocket meet, forming the jaw of the pocket. The knuckles are the intersection of the outer edge of the cushions, parallel to the rail, and the pocket facing. The knuckles are protrusive and comparatively sharp on a pool table, the facings of which can be used like a basketball backboard to rebound a ball into a pocket. On billiard tables for snooker, English billiards and various other games, the knuckles are rounded, and thwart the backboard effect. The curvature of snooker and English billiards knuckles are determined by pocket templates produced by the World Professional Billiards and Snooker Association. Russian pyramid tables also have pointed knuckles, but the facings are angled inward, so the knuckles cannot be used as a backboard. The knuckle is also known as a point, horn or titty, depending on area and the company one keeps. See illustration at the facing entry.

== L ==
ladies' aid
Also lady's aid. A denigrating term for the mechanical bridge.
lag
Also the lag (noun), lagging, lag for the break, and lagging for the break. To determine the order of play, players (representing only themselves, or sometimes teams) each near simultaneously shoot a ball from the kitchen (or in British games, from the baulk line) to the end rail and back toward the bottom rail. Whichever shooter's ball comes to rest closest to the bottom rail gets to choose who breaks. It is permissible but not required for the lagged ball to touch or rebound off the bottom rail, but not to touch the side rails. Lagging is usually a two-party activity, though there are games such as cutthroat in which three players might lag. In the case of a tie, the tying shooters re-lag. The lag is most often used in tournament play or other competitions. In hard-break games like nine-ball and eight-ball the winner of the lag would normally take the break, while in soft-break games like straight pool would likely require the loser of the lag to break, since breaking would be a disadvantage. See also string-off.
last-pocket
Also last pocket. A common rule in informal bar pool, especially bar/pub eight-ball, in which the money ball must be pocketed (potted) in the same pocket as the shooter's last object ball (each player may be said to eventually "own" a pocket, for the duration of the game, in which their 8 ball shot must be played if they have already run out their suit). The variant is not extremely common in the United States or the UK, but is near-universal in much of Latin America (where two cue ball scratches are permitted when attempting the 8 ball shot and count as simple fouls, with only a third scratch constituting a loss of game). Last pocket is also common in North Africa. Last-pocket rules require careful position play, and frequently result in bank and kick shots with the 8 ball.
league
An organization that promotes competitive, usually team, amateur cue sports, most commonly pool, especially eight-ball and nine-ball, although there are also well-established snooker leagues. Some leagues, many of which are decades old, are entirely local and either informal or incorporated, and may use their own local rules or may have adopted more widely published rulesets, such as those of the WPA. Other leagues are organized on a multi-regional or even international level, and may be non-profit or for-profit enterprises, usually with their own fine-tuned rule books. Despite differences, the largest leagues are increasingly converging toward the WPA rules, with the exception of the APA/CPA, which retains rules much closer to US-style bar pool. At least four major pool leagues hold international championships in Las Vegas, Nevada annually (APA/CPA, BCAPL, VNEA and ACS/CCS). Some leagues also offer one-on-one tournaments, scotch doubles events, artistic pool competition, and other non-team activities. (See Category:Cue sports leagues for a listing of articles on various leagues.)
leave
The cue ball's position after a shot. "Good" or "bad" in reference to a leave describe respectively and advantageous or disadvantageous position for the next shot, or to leave an incoming opponent safe. See also position play; compare position, shape.
legal
As in many other sports, "legal" means not causing or likely to cause a foul (the opposite being illegal). A legal hit is one in which the requirements for a non-foul hit are met (e.g., in nine-ball, the lowest-numbered ball on the table was hit by the cue ball first, and at least one object ball was pocketed, or any ball reached a cushion, after the hit on the first object ball.). A legal shot is one in which no foul of any kind was involved (e.g. there was not a double hit by the cue, the player's bridge hand did not move a ball, etc.). A legal stroke is one in which the cue stroke obeyed the rules (e.g. the shooter did not perform an illegal jump shot by scooping under the cue ball with the cue tip). A legal ball is a ball-on, an object ball at which it is permissible for the player to shoot. And so on. The term can be used in many ways consistent with these examples ("legal pocket" in one-pocket, "legal equipment" under tournament specifications, etc.).
left
Short for left english (side), i.e. spin imparted to the cue ball by stroking it to the lefthand side of its vertical axis. Contrast right.
lemon
A player is said to be a "lemon", "lemon man", or "playing on the lemon" when they intentionally play below their true ability in order to attract more gambling action and win more money. Players who fall for the ruse would be less likely to gamble with the lemon if they showed their full ability at all times.
lemonade stroke
An intentionally amateurish stroke to disguise one's ability to play. Compare on the lemonade.
let out
To allow an opponent to stop playing a set for money in exchange for something. If a player is winning a set by a wide margin, with $100 on the line, the player could say, "I'll let you out now for $75." This is usually meant to save pride.
little

In eight-ball, to be shooting the solid suit (group) of balls (1 through 7); "you're little, remember", "you're the little balls" or "I've got the littles". Compare small, solids, reds, low, spots, dots, unders; contrast big.
lock
A game that basically cannot be lost based on disparity of skill levels; "this game is a lock for him."
lock artist
Someone talented at making lock games.
lock up
The act of playing a devastating safety that leaves the opponent in a situation where it is very difficult, or near impossible, to make a legal hit on an object ball. See also jail.
long bank
A cross-corner bank shot from one end of the table to the other (i.e. across the center string). Long banks are considerably more difficult, because of the smaller margin for error due to distance and angle widening, than cross-side banks and short cross-corner banks from the same end of the table.
long double
Chiefly British: bank shot played up and down the longer length of the table off a short rail and into a corner pocket, as opposed to the more common bank across the short length into a center pocket or corner.
long pot
In snooker, a pot into any of the corner pockets where the cue ball had started in the opposite lengthwise half of the table. In other words, a pot in which the cue ball or object ball crosses an imaginary line joining the middle pockets.
long rail
Same as side rail.
long string
An imaginary line dividing the table into two equal halves lengthwise. It intersects the head string, center string and foot string at the head spot, center spot and foot spot, respectively.
look back
To enter the loser bracket in a double elimination tournament, or otherwise slip in standing in other tournament formats (i.e., to lose a game/frame/round/match, but still remain in the competition).
loop bridge
Same as closed bridge.
losing hazard
Also loser, largely obsolete. A shot in which the cue ball is potted after caroming off another ball. In snooker and most pool games doing this would be a fault (foul), but the move will score points in many games in which hazards (as such) apply, such as English billiards, or in the final or game point in Cowboy pool. The term derives from this hazard costing the player points in early forms of billiards. Compare in-off, scratch. Contrast winning hazard.
low
1. Also lows, low balls, low ones. In eight-ball, to be shooting the solid suit (group) of balls (1 through 7); "you're low, remember", "you're low balls" or "I've got the lows." Compare solids, reds, little, spots, dots, unders; contrast high.
2. With draw, as in "I shot that low left", meaning "I shot that with draw and with left english". Derives from the fact that one must aim below the cue ball's equator, i.e. "low" on the ball, to impart draw. Contrast high.

== M ==
mace
The forerunner of the cue was the mace, an implement similar to a lightweight golf club, with a foot that was generally used to shove rather than strike the cue ball. When the ball was frozen against a rail cushion, use of the mace was difficult (the foot would not fit under the edge of the cushion to strike the ball squarely), and by 1670 experienced players often used the tail or butt end of the mace instead.
machine gun shot
1. In snooker, a trick shot that involves lining up a number of balls, for example along the baulk line, then, after striking the cue ball toward a corner pocket, hitting the other balls directly with the cue stick into that pocket before the cue ball reaches it.
2. In pool, a trick shot where a number of object balls are placed in a row to form a line, sometimes near a cushion, or in a line and the cue ball is shot into the balls so as to reverberate between them while traveling and hit each one of the object balls in series, issuing a machine gun-like sound.
magnetic cue ball
A cue ball that, due to embedded iron content, is responsive enough to a strong magnet that a modern coin-operated bar table with a magnetic ball-return mechanism can distinguish and separate the cue ball from the object balls. Magnetic cue balls are usually the same standard size as the object balls in the set, and near regulation weight, typically 0.5 to 1 ounce (14–28 g) heavier than the object balls. As such they do not suffer the playability problems of either excessively dense, ceramic "rock" or notable oversized "grapefruit" cue balls, and demonstrate only minimal smash-through. Magnetic balls are standard equipment in some leagues, including the VNEA. Magnetics come in three construction types of iron embedded in the same phenolic resin or other modern, resilient plastic that the object balls are made of: a solid metal core (prone to being off-center and not rolling true); small metal bars distributed around the interior of the ball (the most common, and less prone but not immune to balance defects); and tiny metal filings throughout the material (the most consistent, only made by one manufacturer, and expensive).
mark
1. The target of a scam or hustle;
2. A foolish person in a pool room;
3. To indicate where something is to be done. To "mark the pocket" means to indicate which pocket you intend to sink an object ball. Contrast fish.
massé

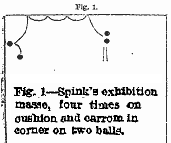
An extreme massé shot by William A. Spinks during an 1893 exhibition game against Jacob Schaefer Sr. Starting from bottom left, his cue ball swerves into and caroms off one object ball, then due to its extreme spin rebounds into the cushion four times before finally rolling away for a perfect, scoring hit on the other object ball. And Spinks lost this game.

Also massé shot. A steep curve or complete reversal of cue ball direction without the necessity of any rail or object ball being struck, due to extreme spin imparted to the cue ball by a steeply elevated cue. Its invention is credited to François Mingaud. Compare semi-massé.
master break
Breaking and going on to win the game in one visit.
match
1. The overall competition between two players, two pairs of players or two teams of players, usually consisting of a predetermined number of frames or games (sometimes organized into rounds). There are also specialized match formats where the game number is not predetermined; see race and ahead race for examples.
2. To agree to rise to a higher wager, as in "$100? Yeah, I'll match that" (i.e., basically equivalent to "call a raise" in poker).
match ball
The ball required to guarantee victory in a match. Sometimes used figuratively to mean the last difficult ball required (chiefly British and usually used in multi-frame matches, particularly snooker).
match play

1. Chiefly British: Competitive play in matches with standings consequences, such as local snooker league competition or the World Snooker Championship, as opposed to practice, playing with friends at the pub, or hustling pool for money.
2. Chiefly American: Same as one-on-one as applied to league play. (Definition appears to have been introduced by USA Pool League misapplying the term "match" to what is otherwise termed a "race".)
maximum break

Also simply maximum.

In snooker, the highest break attainable with the balls that are racked; usually 147 points starting by potting fifteen reds, in combination with blacks, and clearing the colours. Also called a 147 (one-four-seven). In six-red snooker, the maximum break is only 75 points, due to fewer red balls and thus fewer black-scoring opportunities. See also total clearance.
mechanical bridge
A special stick with a grooved, slotted or otherwise supportive end attachment that helps guide the cue stick – a stand-in for the bridge hand. It is usually used only when the shot cannot be comfortably reached with a hand bridge. In American English, often shortened to bridge or called a bridge stick; the term rake is also common. An entire class of different mechanical bridges exist for snooker, called rests (see that entry for details), also commonly used in blackball and English billiards. Mechanical bridges have many derogatory nicknames, such as "ladies' aid", "crutch", "granny stick", and "sissy stick", because of the perception by many amateur players that they are evidence of weak playing skills or technique (the opposite is actually true). Small mechanical bridges, that stand on the table surface instead of being mounted on sticks, exist for disabled players who do not have or cannot use both hands or arms.
merry widow
Jargon term for a type of cue stick that has a plain forearm, without the tapered "points" that are a common feature of standard cue sticks.
middle pocket
Same as centre pocket.
middle spot
Same as center spot; uncommon.
miscue
A stroke in which the cue's tip glances or slips off the cue ball not effectively transferring the intended force. Usually the result is a bungled shot. Common causes include a lack of chalk on the cue tip, a poorly groomed cue tip and not stroking straight through the cue ball, e.g. because of steering. Sometimes played intentionally to avoid a double hit when the cue ball is very close to an object ball or cushion. Also the distinctive metallic sound made when a miscue occurs.
miss
In snooker, a referee calls a miss when a player fouls by failing to hit the ball on and the referee decides that the player has not made a good enough attempt to hit the ball. The miss rule gives the opponent the option to have the referee replace the balls to their original positions and make the player take the shot again. A miss usually occurs when a player makes an unsuccessful attempt at escaping from a snooker. It is a controversial rule aimed at formally discouraging deliberate fouls. In professional snooker, a referee will almost always call a miss on any foul where the player misses the ball on, regardless of how close the player comes to hitting it. If a player is called for a miss three times in a single visit while not snookered, they forfeit the frame; to avoid this, players almost always play an easy hit on their third attempt, even if it is likely to leave a chance for the opponent.
missable
Describing a difficult pot: "the awkward cueing makes this shot missable."
modern era
In professional snooker, the modern era is the period from 1969 to the present day. The BBC launched its Pot Black series in 1969 and the World Snooker Championship reverted to a knockout tournament format in the same year. The modern era has seen increasing professionalisation of the sport, more television and media coverage, greater numbers of tournaments, and higher prize money.
money added
Said of a tournament in which the pot of money to pay out to the winner(s) contains sponsor monies in addition to competitor entry fees. Often used as an adjective: "a money-added event". See also added.
money ball
Name for the ball that when legally pocketed, wins the game, or any ball that when made results in a payday such as a "way" in the game of Chicago. If a money ball is illegally pocketed, it usually results in a loss of game, or a foul.
money game
A game (often actually a race) the outcome of which is the subject of gambling by the players and/or by stakehorses. Participants may use the phrase "this is a money game" to indicate to others that they take the contest more seriously than a casual game and, e.g., are unwilling to make sportsmanlike compromises or do not appreciate distractions. A clear illustration of the latter is in the "two brothers and a stranger" hustling scene in the film The Color of Money.
money, in the
See in the money.
money table
The table reserved for money games or, by extension, the best table in the house. This table is typically of better quality and regularly maintained, and may have pockets that are unusually tight. Money tables in popular venues may be outright reserved for major action.
mushroom
Also mushroomed tip. Leather of the cue tip overhanging the ferrule because of compression from innumerable repeated impacts against the cue ball without proper maintenance of the tip. It must be trimmed off, or it will cause miscues and inaccuracies, as it is not backed by the solid ferrule and thus will compress much more than the tip should on impact. See also burnish.
mushroom trimmer
Also mushroom shaver, mushroom cutter. A sharp-bladed tip tool used to trim the mushroomed portion off a cue tip and restore it to its proper shape.

== N ==
nap
A directional pile created by the short fuzzy ends of fibers on the surface of cloth projecting upward from the lie and which create a favorable and unfavorable direction for rolling balls. The convention in most billiards games in which directional nap cloth is used is to brush the cloth along the table in the same direction of the nap, usually from the end that a player breaks. In snooker and UK eight-ball especially, this creates the effect of creep in the direction of the nap, the most-affected shot being a slow roll into a center pocket against the nap. It is commonly referred to in the fuller term "nap of the cloth." When nap is used in relation to woven cloths that have no directional pile, such as those typically used in the U.S. for pool tables, the term simply refers to the fuzziness of the cloth.
natural
1. Noun: In pool, a natural is an easy shot requiring no side spin (english).
2. Adjective: In pool, a shot is said to be natural if it does not require adjustments, such as a cut angle, side spin, or unusual force. A natural bank shot, for example, is one in which simply shooting straight into the object ball at medium speed and with no spin will send the object ball directly into the target pocket on the other side of the table.
3. In three cushion billiards, the easiest type of shot, in which the second object ball is advantageously placed in a corner. See also big ball.
nine-ball
1.
The dominant professional pool game. It is a rotation game, in which the lowest-numbered object ball must be hit first (though balls may be pocketed in any order, such as with a carom shot or combination shot). The game ends when the 9 ball is legally pocketed, either as the last remaining object ball, or early as long as the lowest-numbered ball was struck first.
2. The spelled-out name of the 9 ball.
nip draw
A short, jabbed draw stroke usually employed so as to not commit a foul (i.e. due to following through to a double hit) when the cue ball is very near to the target object ball.
nit
Someone who wants too high a handicap or refuses to wager any money on a relatively fair match; a general pool room pejorative moniker. Probably derived from "nitwit".
nominate
Same as call. (Formal.)
nose
The furthest-protruding edge of the face of the cushion over the bed of the table. The dimensions of the playing area are thus defined by the measurements lengthwise and widthwise between the cushion noses (though specifications may simply refer to the cushion face for short in that context). The height of the nose from the bed determines the cushion profile. The corners (sharp on pool tables, rounded on snooker tables) formed by the nose at the entrance to the pockets are called the knuckles, points, or titties. The difference between the noses and the knuckles of the cushions is that the former run the entire length of the cushion, while the latter are the points or curves formed where the cushion meets the pocket. The edge of cushion on the inside of the pocket jaws is the facing.
nurse

In carom billiards games, when all the balls are kept near each other and a cushion so that with very soft shots the balls can be "nursed" down a rail, allowing multiple successful shots that effectively replicate the same ball setup so that the nurse shots can be continued almost indefinitely, unless a limit is imposed by the rules.

Excessive use of nurse shots in straight rail by players skilled enough to set them up and pull them off repeatedly at will is what led to the development of the balkline and one-cushion game variations, and repetitive shot limitation rules in English billiards.

== O ==
object ball

1. Any ball that may be legally struck by the cue ball (i.e., any ball-on);
2. Any ball other than the cue ball.
Usage notes: When speaking very generally, any ball other than the cue ball is an object ball. In narrower contexts, this may not be the case. For example, when playing eight-ball, one might not think of the 8 ball as an object ball unless shooting for the 8.
offense
The aspect of gameplay concerned with scoring rather than safety.
on a string

1. pool: See Having the cue ball on a string.
2. Carom billiards: Order may be inverted: "as if the balls had strings on them".
on the hill
Describes a player who needs only one more game win to be victorious in the match. See also hill-hill.
on the lemonade
Also on the lemon, laying down the lemon. Disguising the level of one's ability to play; also known as sandbagging or hustling (though the latter has a broader meaning). Compare lemonade stroke.
on the snap
As a result of the opening break shot (the "snap"), usually said of winning by pocketing the money ball ("won on the snap", "got it on the snap", etc.) Employed most commonly in the game of nine-ball where pocketing the 9 ball at any time in the game on a legal stroke, including the break shot, is a win. Sometimes used alone as an exclamation or exhortation, "On the snap!" See also golden break.
on the wire
See games on the wire.
one-on-one
1. Competition between an individual player and an individual opponent, as opposed to team play, scotch doubles, and other multi-player variants.
2. A team play format in which an individual player from the home team plays a race against an individual player from the visiting team, and then is finished for that match. (Same as match play, definition 2.) Several large leagues use this format, including APA/CPA and USAPL. (Contrast round robin.)
one-pocket

One of the most challenging pool games, in which each player is designated a specific corner pocket on the foot rail, and can only score by pocketing the object balls into it. The game (played to a set number of points) typically involves a higher proportion of challenging shots than other games, especially bank shots and kicks.
one-stroke
To shoot without taking enough warm-up strokes to properly aim and feel out the stroke and speed to be applied. One-stroking is a common symptom of nervousness and is a source of missed shots and failed position. See also choke, dog.
open
1. In eight-ball, when all object balls are balls-on for either player. See open table.
2. A description of a break shot in which the rack (pack) is spread apart well. See also the open break requirement in some games' rules, including eight-ball and nine-ball
3. In carom billiards, descriptive of play in which the balls are not gathered. See open play.
4. A description of a layout of balls that, because it is so spread out, makes it easy for a good player to run out and win, due to lack of problematic clustered balls.
open break
A requirement under some pool rulesets that either an object ball be pocketed, or at least four object balls be driven to contact the cushions, on the opening break shot. Contrast soft break.
open bridge
A bridge formed by the hand where no finger loops over the shaft of the cue. Typically, the cue stick is channeled by a "v"-shaped groove formed by the thumb and the base of the index finger.
open play
A description of play in carom billiards games in which the balls remain widely separated rather than gathered, requiring much more skill to score points and making nurse shots effectively impossible, and making for a more interesting game for onlookers. Most skilled players try to gather the balls as quickly as possible to increase their chances of continuing to score in a long run.
open table
In eight-ball and related games, describes the situation in which neither player has yet claimed a suit (group) of balls. Often shortened to simply open: "Is it still an open table?" "Yes, it's open."
orange ball
In Snooker plus, an additional colour ball worth eight points.
orange crush, the
The 5 out (meaning the player getting the handicap can win by making the 5, 6, 7, 8 or 9 balls).
out
1. A specific ball number followed by "out" refers to a handicap in nine-ball or other rotation games where the "spot" is all balls from that designated number to the money ball. To illustrate, the 6-out in a nine-ball game would allow the player getting weight to win by legally pocketing the 6, 7, 8 or 9 balls.
2. Short for run out, especially as a noun: "That was a nice out."
outside english
Side spin on a cue ball on the opposite side of the direction of the cut angle to be played (right-hand english when cutting an object ball to the left, and vice versa). In addition to affecting cue ball position, outside english can be used to decrease throw.
overcut
Hitting the object ball with too large of a cut angle; hitting the object ball too thin. It is a well-known maxim that overcutting is preferable to undercutting in many situations, as it more often leaves the table in a disadvantageous position on the miss than does an undercut. See also professional side of the pocket.
overs
Same as stripes, in New Zealand. Compare yellows, high, big ones; contrast unders.

== P ==
pack
1. In snooker, the bunch of reds that are typically left below the pink spot in the early stages of a frame, not including those reds that have been released into pottable positions.
2. A cluster of balls.
3. Same as package.
package
Successive games won without the opponent getting to the table; a five-pack would be a package of five games.
pairs
Same as doubles (chiefly British).
paper cut
Same as feather (US) or snick (UK) (US, colloquial).
parking the cue ball
1. Having the cue ball stop at or near the center of the table on a forceful break shot (the breaking ideal in many games such as nine-ball);
2. Having the cue ball stop precisely where intended.
peas
Also pills, tally balls and shake balls. Small, round markers typically numbered 1 through 16, which are placed in a bottle for various random assignment purposes, such as in a tournament roster, to assign order of play in a multiplayer game, or to assign particular balls to players in games such as kelly pool.
penalty points
1. In snooker, points awarded to an opponent following a foul.
pendulum cannon
1. In English billiards, a cannon made when the object balls are about two or three inches apart; parallel to, and close to a cushion. The object balls remain nearly stationary, and the player can then play a shot that reverses the striking order of the cue ball against to object balls.
percentage
See play the percentages. Used by itself often with "low" and "high": "that's a low-percentage shot for me", "I should really take the high-percentage one".
pills
Same as peas.
pin
1. A bolt-threaded protrusion inside the joint of the cue, usually protruding from the butt and screwing into the shaft rather than vice versa. Most modern cues make use of metal pins and collars, but carom billiards cues usually have a wooden pin, and a collarless wood-on-wood joint.
2. Same as skittle.
pink ball
Also the pink. In snooker, the second-highest value colour ball, being worth six points. It is placed on the pink spot. In some (especially American) snooker ball sets, it is numbered "6" on its surface.
pink spot
The marked spot on a snooker table at which the pink ball is placed. Regardless of table size, it is exactly midway between the centre spot (blue spot) and the face (nose) of the top cushion. Also known as the pyramid spot (sense 2).
piqué
Also piquet. Either a massé shot with no english (sidespin), or a shot in which the cue stick is steeply angled, but not held quite as near-vertically as it is in full massé.
place
To reach a certain position in a tournament. "I placed 17th." "She will probably place in the money this time."
plain ball
In snooker, hitting the cue ball in the center, without any spin.
plant
Chiefly British. Same as combination shot.
play the percentages
Using knowledge of the game and one's own abilities and limitations to choose the manner of shooting and the particular shot from an array presented, that has a degree of likelihood of success. This often requires a player to forego a shot that if made would be very advantageous but does not have a high likelihood of success, in favor of a safety or less advantageous shot that is more realistically achievable.
playing area
Also playing surface. The area of the table on which the balls roll, i.e. the table surface exclusive of the rails and the tops of the cushions. The playing surface is defined by the measurements lengthwise and widthwise between the cushion noses (though specifications may simply refer to the cushion faces for short in that context). Artistic pool and other forms of trick shots sometimes call for shots to go beyond the bounds of the playing surface, e.g. a jump shot off the table into a boot on the floor, in Mike Massey's classic "boot shot". The playing surface is what is used, not the entire table, when describing the approximate size of billiard tables of all kinds (e.g. "an 8 × 4 foot pool table").
pocket
1. (noun) An opening in a billiards table, cut partly into the bed and partly into the rails and their cushions, into which balls are shot (pocketed or potted). Pockets may drop into a leather or cloth net, a solid cup, or a ball-return mechanism. The jaws of the pocket have a cushion facing; the knuckle or point is where this facing meets (in a pointed or curved fashion) the cushion that bounds the playing surface of the table. Billiards-style pockets also feature in some distantly related tabletop games like carrom, novuss, pichenotte, pitchnut, air hockey, and the historical bagatelle family of games. Historically related to the holes in golf, the basic concept of a ball-capturing target or hazard is a feature of many other games, including pinball, cornhole, skeeball, and (in an elevated fashion) basketball.
2. (verb) To send a ball into a pocket, usually intentionally.
pocket facing
Same as facing.
pocket speed

1. Describes the propensity of table pockets to more easily accept an imperfectly aimed ball shot at a relatively soft speed, that might not fall if shot with more velocity ("that ball normally wouldn't fall but he hit it at pocket speed"). The less sensitive to shot-speed that a pocket is, the "faster" it is said to be.
2. Describes the velocity of an object ball shot with just enough speed to reach the intended pocket and drop. "Shoot this with pocket speed only, so you don't send the cue ball too far up-table."
pocket template
A rigid, flat piece of material such as plastic that outlines the exact angles and curvature of the knuckles of the cushions at a pocket, the width of their separation across the pocket opening (the jaws of the pocket) and the depth into the jaws where the pocket drop is. The templates thereby determine the size and other playing aspects of the pocket. Such standardization is used especially in snooker and English billiards, for which the World Professional Billiards and Snooker Association presently issues pocket templates. These proprietary templates are tightly controlled, and only provided to approved venues and manufacturers. Each table requires two pairs of templates, as the specifications for corner and centre (side) pockets are entirely different. For each pocket type, one template is used to determine pocket width and other horizontal aspects, while the other measures the face of the cushions including any undercut, the fall of the pocket, and other vertical aspects. See also racking template, training template.
point
1. A unit of scoring, in games such as snooker and straight pool with numerical scoring.
2. A unit of scoring, in team matches in leagues that use numerical scoring instead of simple game/frame win vs. loss ratios.
3. Another term for knuckle / tittie.
pointing
A term used to indicate balls that are frozen to each other, or close enough, such that no matter from which angle they are hit, the combination will send the outer ball in the same predictable direction. "Are the 2 and 7 pointing at the corner? Okay, I'll use that duck to get position way over there."
points on the wire
Same as games on the wire.
points remaining
In a frame of snooker, the maximum number of points remaining on the table can be calculated with the formula 8r + 27, where r is the number of red balls left, 8 is the highest score that can be attained from potting a red and a colour (a 1-point red followed by a 7-point black), and 27 is the combined value of all six colours (yellow: 2, green: 3, brown: 4, blue: 5, pink: 6, black: 7). As an example, the maximum number of points remaining with five reds left on the table is (8 × 5) + 27 = 67. After all the reds have been potted, the number of points available is the sum of the values of the remaining colours. For instance, if only blue, pink, and black are left, the number of points remaining is 5 + 6 + 7 = 18. The state of play in a frame is often described in terms of a player's lead (or deficit) relative to the points left on the table, e.g., "42 ahead with 51 remaining". When the points difference between the players exceeds the maximum number of points remaining, the frame reaches the snookers required stage.
pool glasses
Also pool spectacles, pool specs. Same as billiards glasses.

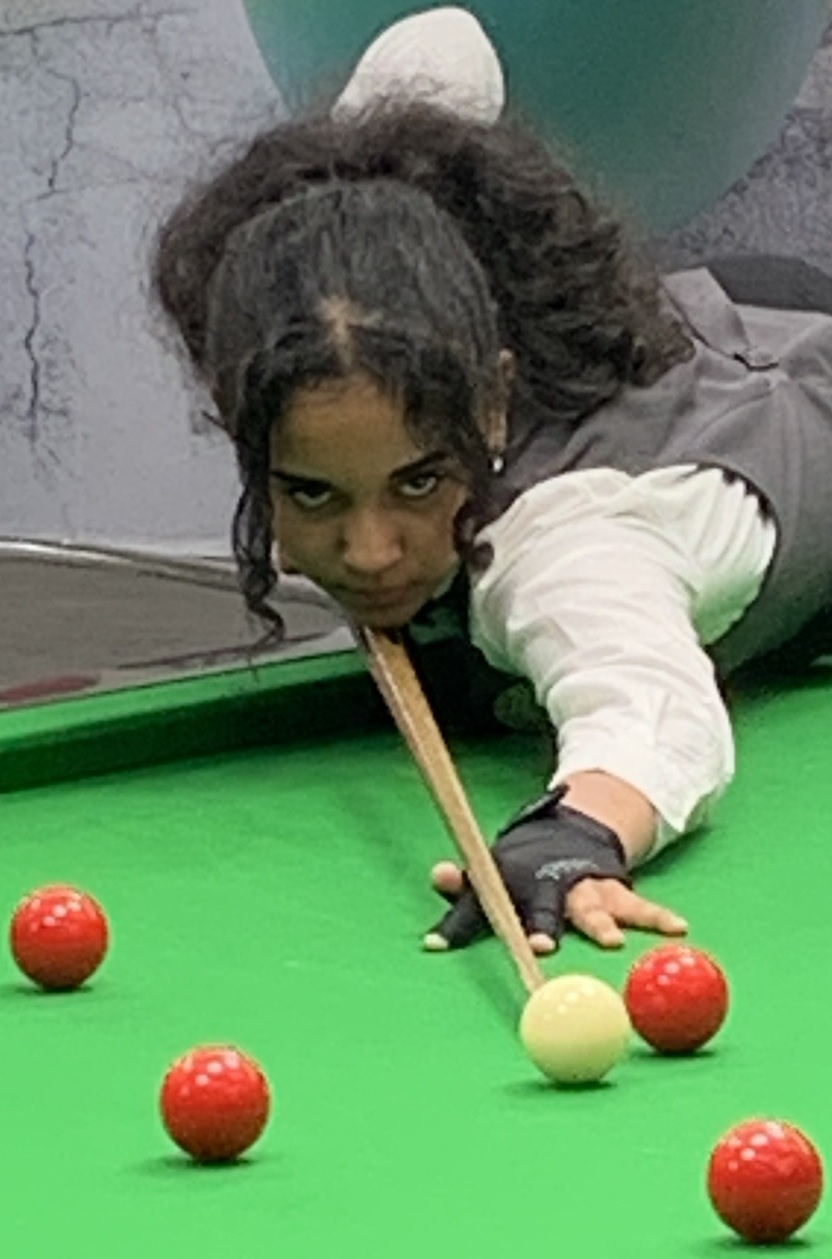
Ellise Scott (pictured in 2024) playing snooker with a pool glove on her bridge hand

pool glove
A tight, Spandex glove covering usually most or all of the thumb, index finger and middle finger, worn on the bridge hand as a more convenient and less messy alternative to using hand talc, and for the same purpose: a smooth-gliding stroke.
pool shark
See shark (in all senses).
position
The placement of the balls, especially the cue ball, relative to the next planned shot. Also known as shape. See also position play, leave.
position play
Skilled playing in which knowledge of ball speed, angles, post-impact trajectory, and other factors are used to gain position (i.e. a good leave) after the target ball is struck. The goals of position play are generally to ensure that the next shot is easy or at least makeable, and/or to play a safety in the advent of a miss (intentional or otherwise).
pot
1. (verb, chiefly British) To sink a ball into a pocket. See also pocket (verb).
2. (noun, chiefly British) An instance of potting a ball ("it was a good pot considering the angle and distance of the shot").
3. (noun) Pooled money being played for, in money games or tournaments, as in poker and other gambling activities. This very old term derives from players placing their stakes into a pot or other receptacle before play begins.
pot and tuck
A tactic employed in UK eight-ball pool in which a player calls and pots one of the balls in a favorably lying set, then plays safe, leaving as many of their well-placed balls on the table as possible, until the opponents commits a foul or leaves a chance that the player feels warrants an attempt at running out.
pot success
A statistical value given to how often a player is completing pots in a match, usually expressed as a percentage.
potter
A British term for someone with little experience or understanding of the game, who may be skilled at potting individual balls but does not consider tactics such as position or safety; "he's a potter, not a player." Compare U.S. banger.
potting angle
The desired angle that must be created between the path of the cue ball and the path of the object ball upon contact to pot the object ball. It is usually measured to the center of the pocket. See also aiming line.
power draw
Extreme application of draw.
professional foul
A deliberate foul that leaves the balls in a safe position, reducing the risk of giving a frame-winning chance to the opponent. The miss rule in snooker was implemented primarily to discourage the professional fouls.
professional side of the pocket

The long-rail side of a corner pocket. To "aim for the profession side of the pocket" is to slightly overcut a difficult corner-pocket cut shot, to cheat the pocket, rather than undercutting, especially in nine-ball. Erring too much in this direction is "missing on the professional side of the pocket." It is so called because experienced players understand that on a thin cut, overcutting the object ball to a corner pocket will far more often leave the object ball in an unfavorable position, i.e. along the short rail for the incoming opponent than will an undercut, which often leaves the object ball sitting in front of or nearby the pocket it had been intended for on a miss.

By contrast, in eight-ball, except when both players are shooting at the 8 ball, the incoming player after a miss is shooting for different object balls, so this maxim does not apply, and the opposite may be good strategy as, if the object ball stays near the pocket through an undercut, it is advantageously positioned for a subsequent turn and may block the opponent's use of the pocket.
program
Also (chiefly British) programme. Short for shot program.
purple ball
In snooker plus, an additional colour ball worth ten points.
push
1. Same as push out.
2. Same as push shot.
push out
As an adjective or compound noun: push-out. A rule in many games (most notably nine-ball, after and only after the break shot), allowing a player to "push out" the cue ball to a new position without having to contact any ball, much less pocket one or drive it to a cushion, but not counting any pocketed ball as valid (other foul rules apply, such as double hits, scratching the cue ball, etc.), with the caveat that the opponent may shoot from the new cue ball position or give the shot back to the pusher who must shoot from the new position. In nine-ball particularly, and derived games such as seven-ball and ten-ball, pocketing the money ball on a push-out results in that ball being respotted (which can be used to strategic advantage in certain circumstances, such as when the break leaves no shot on the ball-on, and failure to hit it would give the incoming player an instant-win combination shot on the money ball).
push shot
Any foul shot in which a player's cue tip stays in contact with the cue ball for more than the momentary time commensurate with a stroked shot. In the game of snooker, it is considered a push if the cue strikes the cue ball more than once in a given shot (a double hit) or if the cue stick, cue ball, and ball-on are all in contact together during a shot (if the cue ball and object ball began frozen together, the player must shoot away from that object ball without moving it and the touching ball rule applies).
put up money
1. For a player to place money for a wager in an openly visible spot (typically on the hanging light above the table, thus the origin of the phrase); this demonstrates that the money is actually present and obviates any need to demand its production from the loser's pocket. "You want to play for 500? Put it up!"
2. To stake a particular amount of money on a gambling player. "I'll put up another 2000, but you'd better win this time."
3. On a coin-operated bar table, to place one or more coins on the rail, or on the bed of the table under the cushion, as a marker of one's place in line (UK: on queue) to play. "You didn't put your quarters up." An alternative is to put one's name on a list, e.g. on a chalkboard.
pyramid
1. The full fifteen ball set of pool or snooker object balls after being racked, before the break shot (i.e., same as rack, definition 2, and triangle, defn. 2). Chiefly British today, but also an American usage ca. World War I.
2. Also pyramids. The game of Russian pyramid or any related game.
pyramid spot
1. In pool, same as foot spot: The spot on which the pyramid is racked, with the apex ball on this spot. Chiefly British today, but also an American usage ca. World War I.
2. In snooker (and by extension modern English billiards), same as pink spot: The spot on which the pink ball is placed, in front of the pyramid.

== Q ==
quadruple century
Also quadruple-century break. See double century.
quintuple century
Also quintuple-century break. See double century.

== R ==
race
A predetermined, fixed number of games or points a player must achieve to win a match or game; "a race to seven" means whoever wins seven games first wins the match. See also ahead race for a more specialized usage.
rack (noun)
1. A geometric form, usually aluminum, wooden or plastic, used to assist in setting up balls in games like eight-ball, nine-ball, and snooker. The rack allows for more consistently tight grouping of balls, which is necessary for a successful break shot. In most games a triangle-shaped rack capable of holding fifteen balls can be employed, even if the game calls for racking less than a full ball set, such as in the game of nine-ball. For further information, see the Rack (billiards) main article.
2. Used to refer to a racked group of balls before they have been broken.
3. In some games, refers to a single frame.
4. Colloquial shorthand for "a set of balls".
5. Short for cue rack, wall rack or scoring rack when such abbreviation would not be ambiguous.
rack (verb)
The act of setting up the balls for a break shot. In tournament play this will be done by the referee, but in lower-level play, players either rack for themselves or for each other depending on convention.
rack and run
Chiefly American: In pool games, when a player racks the object balls, and the breaking opponent does not pocket a ball on the break, and the person who racked the game commences to run out all of the remaining object balls without the breaker getting another visit at the table. This is similar to a break and run, with the key difference being that the person executing the "rack and run" did not break the balls in that game.
racking template
An outgrowth of the training template concept, a racking template is a racking tool used in place of a traditional rigid ball rack for pool or snooker balls, consisting of a very thin, e.g. 0.14 mm (0.0055 in), sheet of material such as paper or plastic with holes into which object balls settle snugly against one another to form a tight rack (pack). The template is placed, stencil-like, in racking position, with the lead ball's hole directly over the center of the foot spot. The balls are then placed onto the template and arranged to settle into their holes, forming a tight rack. Unlike with a training template, the balls are not tapped to create divots, and instead the template is left in place until after the break shot at which time it can be removed (unless balls are still sitting on top of it). Manufacturers such as Magic Ball Rack insist that racking templates are designed "to affect the balls to a minimum". Although Magic Ball Rack implies development work since 2006, other evidence suggests invention, by Magic Ball Rack's founder, in mid-2009, with product announcement taking place in September of that year.See also pocket template.
rail
Also (uncommonly) cushion rail. The sides of a table's frame upon which the elastic cushions are mounted and in which the diamonds (sights) are inlaid (on tables that possess them). The term is often used interchangeably with cushion.
rake
Same as mechanical bridge; so-called because of its typical shape.
rat in
To pocket a ball by luck; "he ratted in the 9 ball"; usually employed disapprovingly. See also slop.
rearrange the furniture
to disturb balls that favor your opponent sufficiently as such that the new rearrangement or layout of balls might end up favoring you or when your shot goes wild and rearranges the balls into an unpredicted pattern, necessitating both players having to replan their strategy.
rebound angle
Same as angle of reflection.
red ball

1. In snooker, any of the 15 balls worth one point each that can be potted in any order. During the course of a break a player must first pot a red followed by a colour, and then a red and colour, etc., until the reds run out and then the re-spotted six colours must be cleared in their order. Potting more than one red in a single shot is not a foul – the player simply gets a point for each red potted. Red balls are never numbered "1" on their surface, even in (primarily American) sets in which the colours are numbered with their values.
2. In blackball, one of two groups of seven object balls that must be potted before the black. Reds are spotted before yellows, if balls from both group must be spotted at the same time. Compare stripes; contrast yellow ball.
3. In carom billiards, the object ball that is neither player's cue ball.
recycle the cue ball
In snooker, to make a series of shots to regain position from being out of position.
referee
The person in charge of the game whose primary role is to ensure adherence by both players to the appropriate rules of the game being played. Other duties of the referee include racking each frame, re-spotting balls during the course of a game, maintaining the equipment associated with the table (e.g. keeping the balls clean), controlling the crowd and, if necessary, controlling the players. Formerly sometimes referred to as the umpire.
re-rack

1. In snooker, the abandonment of a frame upon agreement between the players, so that the balls can be set up again and the frame restarted with no change to the score since the last completed frame. This is the result of situations, such as trading of containing safeties, where there is no foreseeable change to the pattern of shots being played, so the frame could go on indefinitely.
2. In pool, placing of the object balls back in the rack, after a foul break.
re-spot

1. Same as re-spotted black.
2. Same as spot (verb), sense 1 (pool) and sense 2 (snooker).
re-spotted black
In snooker, a situation where the scores are tied after all the balls have been potted, and the black ball is re-spotted and the first player to pot it wins. The players toss for the first shot, which must be taken with the cue ball in the D. A safety battle typically ensues, until an error allows a player to pot the black, or a fluke or a difficult pot is made.
rest

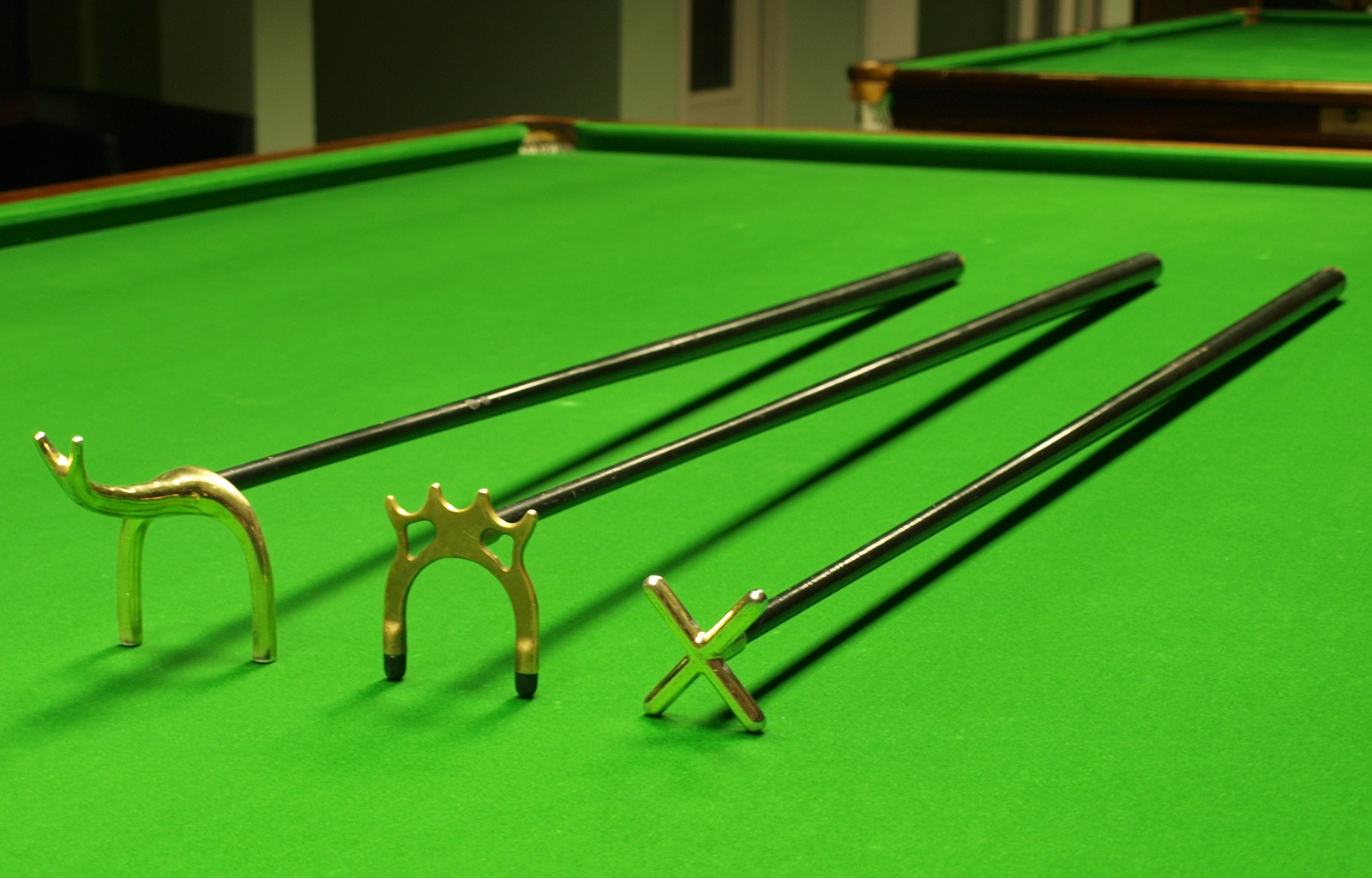
Three types of rest: swan, spider, and cross rake

A chiefly British term for a set of mechanical bridges. British-style rests differ from most American-style rake bridges in shape, and take several forms: the cross, the spider and the swan (or goose neck), as well as the rarer and often unsanctioned hook. When used unqualified, the word usually refers to the cross. Rests are used in snooker, English billiards, and blackball.
reverse english
Side spin on the cue ball that causes it to unnaturally roll off a cushion (contacted at an angle) against rather than with the ball's momentum and direction of travel. If angling into a cushion that is on the right, then reverse english would be right english, and vice versa. The angle of deflection will be steeper (narrower) than if no english were applied. The opposite of running english, which has effects other than simply the opposites of those of reverse english.
right
Short for right english (side), i.e. side spin imparted to the cue ball by stroking it to the right-hand side of its vertical axis. Contrast left.
ring game
1. A style of game play in which as many players are allowed to join as the participants choose, and anyone can quit at any time. The term, most often used in the context of gambling, is borrowed from poker. The folk games three-ball and killer are usually played as open ring games, as is Kelly pool.
2. By extension, a multi-player game that anyone may initially join, but which has a fixed roster of competitors once it begins, is sometimes also called a ring game. Cutthroat is, by its nature, such a game. A famous regular ring game event of this sort is the six-player, US$3000-buy-in ring ten-ball competition at the annual Derby City Classic.
3. A nine-ball ring game is played by more than two players and has special rules. Typically, the players choose a random method for setting the order of play, with the winner breaking. Safeties are not allowed and there are two or more money balls – usually the five and nine.
road map
A pool table spread in which the balls are extremely easily positioned for a run out, and where little movement of the cue ball on each shot is necessary to obtain position on the next.
road player
A highly skilled hustler making money gambling while traveling. Fast Eddie Felson in The Hustler was a road player. One of the most notorious real-life road players is Keith McCready.
road team
A road player and stakehorse.
rob
1. (Transitive, "to rob") Playing an opponent for money who has a very low chance of winning based on disparity of skill levels.
2. (Intransitive, "to be robbed") Usually unwittingly playing an opponent for money who has a very high chance of winning based on disparity of skill levels.
3. (Intransitive, "to be robbed") Used humorously in exclamations when a shot that looks like it would work did not, as in "Oh! You got robbed on that one!"
rock
Colloquial term for an unusually hard, heavy cue ball made of ceramic instead of the phenolic resin or other modern, resilient plastics most billiard balls are made of. "Rock" cue balls are frequently found on older coin-operated bar tables that do not have magnetic ball-return mechanisms. As with oversized "grapefruit" cue balls, the ball return works because the cue ball is considerably heavier than, and thereby distinguishable from, the object balls. Because of their brittle material, rocks wear out faster that normal cue balls, are prone to chippings, and due to their density also shorten the lifespan of the object balls and the cloth. Their weight has a strong effect on play, as they are difficult to draw (screw), stop and stun, and generate a large amount of smash-through, compared to standard and magnetic cue balls, but do not reduce cut shot accuracy like grapefruit balls.
rocking cannon
Chiefly British: Same as chuck nurse.
roll
1. Describes lucky or unlucky "rolls" of the cue ball; "I had good rolls all night; "that was a bad roll." However, when said without an adjective ascribing good or bad characteristics to it, "roll" usually refers to a positive outcome such as in "he sure got a roll".
2. The roll: same as the lag.
roll-up
A gentle tap of the cue ball with the intention of getting it as tight as possible behind an object ball, in the hope of a snooker. It is most common in the game of snooker, and is often results in a foul in many pool games, where after the cue ball has contacted a legal object ball either any ball must contact a cushion or any object ball must be pocketed. A roll-up can be legal in such games when the object ball used for the tactic is very close to a cushion, so that either it or the cue ball lightly touch the cushion after ball-on-ball contact.
roquet
A term in croquet and other forms of ground billiards for a carom, sense 3: hitting an object ball with one's own ball; originally spelled the French way, roquêt, into the late 19th century. In croquet, unlike similar games, this triggers a special situation, the croquet stroke: the shooter may take ball in hand, placing their own ball against the opponent's ball that was struck, so that the balls are frozen, then step on the player's own ball to keep it place or slow its movement, and strike it, sending most or all of the energy of the hit into the opponent ball, driving it far away, while leaving the player's own ball in place or rolling slowly to a desired location.
rotation
1. Descriptive of any game in which the object balls must be struck in numerical order. Billiard researcher Mike Shamos observes that it would be more intuitive to call such games "'series' or 'sequence'". The term actually derives from the set-up of the game Chicago, in which the balls are not racked, but placed numerically around the table along the cushions (and must be shot in ascending order). Other common rotation games include 15-ball rotation, nine-ball, and ten-ball
2. The specific pool game of rotation.
round
1. A multi-game division of a match, as used in some league and tournament formats. For example, in a match between two teams of five players each, a 25-game match might be divided into five rounds of five games each, in which the roster of one team moves one line down at the beginning of each round, such that by the end of the match every player on team A has played every player on team B in round robin fashion.
2. A level of competition elimination in a tournament, such as the quarter-final round, semi-final round and final round.
round robin
A tournament format in which each contestant plays each of the other contestants at least once. In typical league team play, round robin format means that each member of the home team plays each member of the visiting team once. This format is used by BCAPL, VNEA and many other leagues. Contrast one-on-one.
round the angles
Describing a shot that requires one or more balls to be played off several cushions, such as an elaborate escape or a positional shot; "he'll have to send the cue ball round the angles to get good position."
rubber match
The deciding match between two tied opponents. Compare hill-hill.
ruckus
A British term (especially in snooker) for the splitting of a group of balls when another ball is sent into them, typically with the intent of deliberately moving them with the cue ball to develop them.
run
The number of balls pocketed in an inning in pool (e.g., a run of five balls), or points scored in a row in carom billiards (e.g., a run of five points). Compare British break (sense 2), which is applied to pool as well as snooker in British English.
run of the balls
Used chiefly in British snooker terminology to suggest that a player has enjoyed more luck than their opponent in a frame or match, such as by getting flukes or other unintentional touches of good fortune. "He certainly had the run of the balls in that match."
run out
1. (verb) Make all of the required shots in a game without the opponent ever getting to the table or getting back to the table
2. (noun) usually run-out, sometimes runout) An instance of running out in a game.
run the table
Similar to run out (sense 1), but more specific to making all required shots from the start of a rack. See also break and run, break and dish.
runner
On a billiard table, the assembly fitted beneath each pocket that catches a ball after it is potted and channels it. If a runner becomes overly filled with balls, the referee may move some balls to a different runner on the table.
running a coup
In English billiards, running a coup is when a player, from ball in hand, directly pockets the cue-ball when no ball(s) are out of baulk. If the ball first makes contact with the flat of a cushion and then (indirectly) enters a pocket, this is not regarded as running a coup.
running english
Also running side spin, running spin. Side spin ("english") on the cue ball that causes it to roll off a cushion (contacted at an angle) with rather than against the ball's natural momentum and direction of travel. If angling into a cushion that is on the right, then running english would be left english, and vice versa. The angle of deflection will be wider than if no english were applied to the cue ball; but more importantly, because the ball is rolling instead of sliding against the cushion, the angle will be more consistent. For this reason, running english is routinely used. Also called running side in British terminology. Contrast reverse english.

== S ==
safe
1. Describing a ball that is in a position that makes it very difficult to pot.
2. Describing a situation a player has been left in by the opponent, intentionally or otherwise, that makes it difficult to pot any balls-on. See also snooker.
safety
1. An intentional defensive shot, the most common goal of which is to leave the opponent either no plausible shot at all, or at least a difficult one.
2. A shot that is called aloud as part of a game's rules; once invoked, a safety usually allows the player to pocket their own object ball without having to shoot again, for strategic purposes. A well-played safety may result in a snooker.
safety break
A break shot in which the object is to leave the incoming player with no shot or a very difficult shot, such as is normally employed in the opening break of straight pool. Cf. open break.
sandbag
To disguise the level of one's ability to play in various ways such as using a lemonade stroke; intentionally missing shots; making an uneven game appear "close"; purposefully losing early, inconsequential games. Sandbagging is a form of hustling, and in handicapped leagues, considered a form of cheating, as it is used to obtain a low handicap so that a skilled player can later use this rating to improper advantage in more important competitions. The term "sandbag" is often applied to other rated tournaments, including chess and Scrabble; the technique was used in the 2012 Olympics by badminton players, resulting in several disqualifications. See also dump and on the lemonade.
saver
Same as gapper.
scotch doubles
A form of doubles (pairs) play in which the two team members take turns, playing alternating shots during an inning (i.e., each team's inning consists of two players' alternating visits, each of one shot only, until that team's inning ends, and the next team begins their alternating-shot turn, or the frame ends.) Effective scotch doubles play requires close rapport between team partners, especially as to advantageous cue ball position for the incoming player; whether the pair may directly communicate with each other during their inning varies by rule set. Like "english", "scotch" is usually not capitalized in this context. The term is also used in bowling, and may have originated there, as well as curling.
score
1. Verb: To earn one or more points with one or more shots in an inning, e.g. "scored 2 that round".
2. Noun: The tally of a player's points, earned by shots and (in some games) awarded by opponent fouls, e.g. "had a score of 12 that game".
3. Noun: The compared total of both (or in games with three or more participants, all) player's/team's points, e.g. "won by a score of 12 to 6".
scoreboard

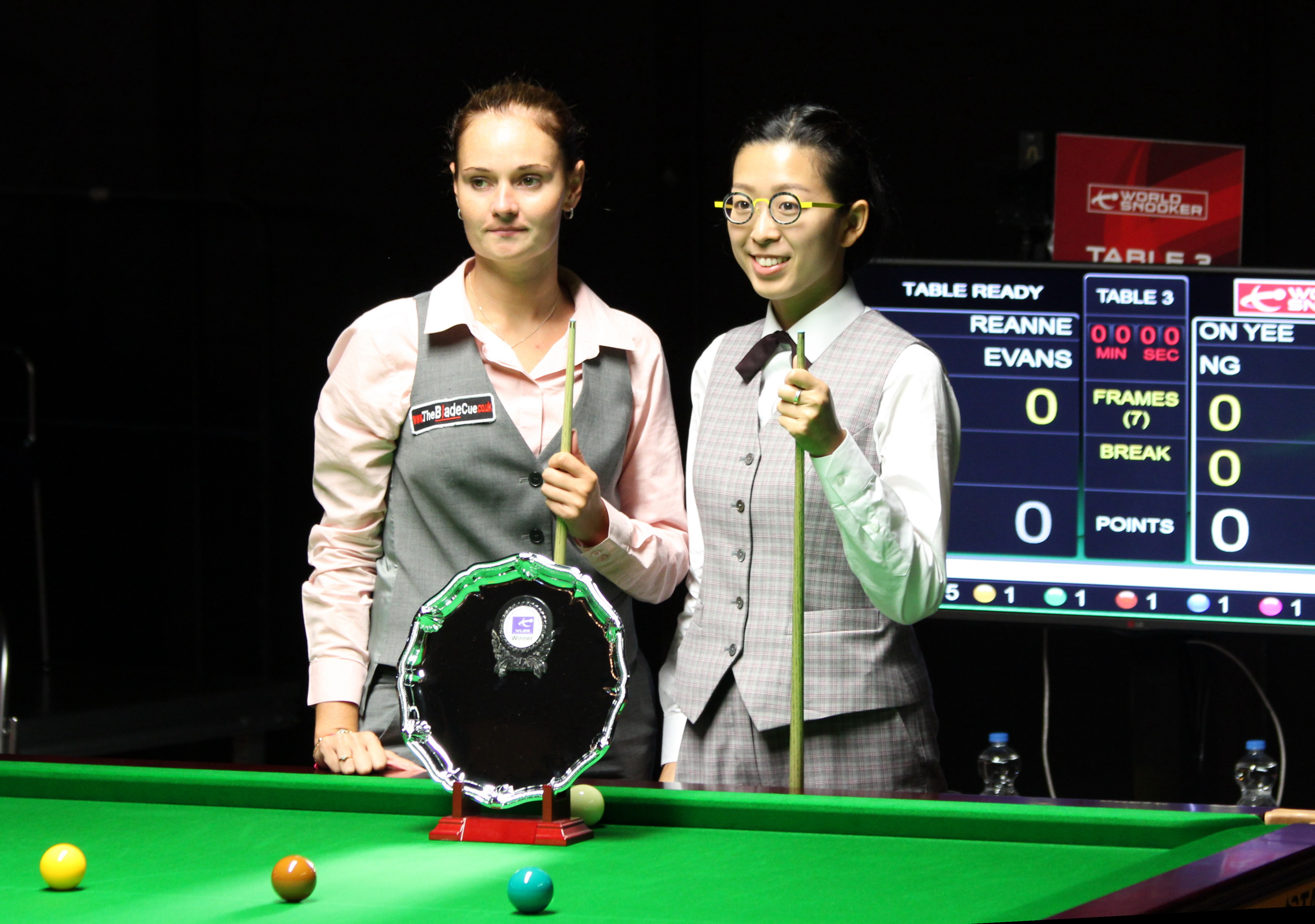
2017 Paul Hunter Women's Classic Finalists Reanne Evans and Ng On-yee pose in front of the scoreboard.

Also score-board, score board.

A usually wall-mounted device for keeping score between two or more players in point-based games or in races. The most common type, mostly used for snooker and straight pool, consists of two or more pointers sliding on board-mounted rails to indicate 1s and 10s marked on the board. Some carom billiards clubs provide digital scoreboards for each table. Other scoring methods include wall-mounted scoring racks, in-rail scoring wheels, and over-table scoring strings.
scorekeeper
Also score-keeper, score keeper. Person who keeps score for others while they play. A designated scorekeeper is common in league play (often the team captain, or a player who is simply not playing at that moment) and in professional tournaments. A scorekeeper may also be used in high-stakes money games, as depicted in the film The Hustler.
scorer
1. Same as scorekeeper.
2. A scoring device, i.e. a scoreboard, scoring rack, scoring string, and/or set of scoring wheels.
scoring rack
Also score rack. A wall-mounted, usually wooden rack with several numbered shelves to hold each player's pocketed balls, used for keeping score between players of games in which points are awarded by the numerical values on the balls. Scoring racks remain common in places where rotation and related games are popular, e.g. Mexico, but are rare where these games have mostly died out. Also known as a counter rack. Sometimes ambiguously called a wall rack or ball rack.
scoring string
Also score string or (ambiguously) string. Same as wire, sense 1.
scoring wheels
Also score wheels. Rotating wheels numbered 0–9 mounted into a rail of the Billiard table, and used for keeping score between two or more players in point-based games or in races. They are typically a pair of wheels, representing 10s and 1s, for at least two players. Such wheels are sometimes also used to create wall-mounted scoreboards.
scratch
Pocketing of the cue ball, in pool games. In most games, a scratch is a type of foul. "Scratch" is sometimes used less precisely to refer to all types of fouls. See also in-off and, more generally, foul.
screw
Same as draw (chiefly British).
scuffer
An abrasive tip tool used as a grinder to roughen the cue tip to better hold chalk after it has become hardened and smooth from repeated impacts with the cue ball. Tappers serve the same purpose, but are used differently. Similar to a shaper, but shallower and less rough.
see
To be able to clearly see a path to a pocket or object ball without any other obstacle interfering, usually as a straight shot: "The 3 ball is hanging in the pocket, but I can't see it because the 9 ball is in my way."
seeding
The placement of player(s) automatically in a tournament where some have to qualify, or automatic placement in later rounds.
sell out
To bungle a shot in a manner that leaves the table in a fortuitous position for the opponent. Contrast sell the farm.
sell the farm
To bungle a shot in a manner that leaves the table in such a fortuitous position for the opponent that there is a strong likelihood of losing the game or match. Contrast sell out.
semi-massé

Also semi-massé shot. A moderate curve imparted to the path of the cue ball by an elevated hit with use of english (side); or a shot using this technique. Also known as a curve (US) or swerve (UK) shot. Compare massé.
session
1. Principally US: One or more sets, usually in the context of gambling. See also ahead race (a.k.a. ahead session) for a more specialized usage.
2. Principally British: In professional snooker, a group of frames played consecutively. A shorter match (typically the best of 7, 9, or 11 frames) is usually completed in one session. A longer match, typically the best of 17 frames or more, is normally played over two or more sessions, usually with 8 to 10 frames in each. A 15-minute mid-session interval takes place after the fourth frame of a session. Some matches take place over three or four sessions. The best-of-35-frame World Snooker Championship final is played over four sessions, respectively of 8, 9, 8, and up to 10 frames.
session to spare
Principally British: In snooker, if a player wins a match without the need for the final session to be played, then they are said to have won the match "with a session to spare". For example, if a player wins a best-of-25-frames match split into three sessions (two sessions of eight frames and one of nine) by a margin of say, 13 frames to 3, the match will be completed after the first two sessions, with no need to play the third.
set
A predetermined number of games, usually played for a specified sum of money. Contrast race (a predetermined number of wins). Informally, sets may refer to gambling more generally, as in "I've been playing sets all day", even when the format is actually races or single games.
set up

1. (Of a player or referee) to place the balls (and other items, if applicable, such as skittles) properly for the beginning of a game: "In eight-ball, properly setting up requires that the rear corners of the rack not have two stripes or two solids but one of each." For most games this is in a racked pattern, but the term is applicable more broadly than "rack", e.g. in carom billiards and in games like bottle pool. Contrast layout.
2. (Of the game equipment) arranged properly for the beginning of a game: "set up and waiting for the break", "an improper set-up"
3. (Of a player, passively and specifically) to have good shape – to be in a favorable position for making a shot or other desired play ("is set-up on the 9", "could be set-up for the corner-pocket after this shot")
4. (Of a player, passively, generally, and chiefly US) to be in a favorable position for, and with a layout conductive to, a long run (UK: break) or complete run-out: "a crucial miss that left their opponent really set-up"; compare (chiefly British) "in the balls"
5. (Of a player, actively) to use position play to move one or more specific balls to specific locations with a specific goal in mind, usually pocketing (potting) a specific ball or getting an easy out, but possibly a safety, nurse or trap shot; in short, to get shape: "She set up on the 9-ball with a careful draw shot." The meaning can be inverted to indicate poor play on the part of the other player: "Oops, I just set you up for an easy win when I missed like that."
6. (Of a table layout) comparatively easy to completely run out, e.g. because of a lack of clusters or blocking balls: "looks like a nice set-up for a quick out", "this table's totally set up for you"
7. (Of cue ball position more specifically): having good shape – comparatively easy to use to some advantage, such as continuing a run (UK: break) or playing safe: "The cue ball's set up for an easy side pocket shot."
8. (Of a shot or strategy) the result of position play (careful or reckless): "Playing the 6 off the 8 was a great set-up to win", "That follow shot was a terrible set-up for the 6-ball."
9. (Of a hustler) to successfully convince a fish that one is not a very skilled player and that gambling on a game will be a good idea: "That guy totally set me up and took me for $200." Such a hustle is a setup or set-up.
seven-ball
1.
A variation of nine-ball but played with only seven balls, and the 7 ball as the game ball or "money ball". An additional difference from nine-ball-style rules is that the 7 must be pocketed in a specific side of the table (each player being assigned one at the beginning of the game). Some custom 7 balls are manufactured for this game, using a black- or white-striped maroon ball instead of a solid maroon one. The game had notable professional play on ESPN's televised tournament series Sudden Death Seven-ball, 2000–2005.
2. The spelled-out name of the 7 ball.
sewer
A pocket; usually used in disgust when describing a scratch (e.g., "the cue ball's gone down the sewer").
shaft
The upper portion of a cue which slides on a player's bridge hand and upon which the tip of the cue is mounted at its terminus. It also applies to the main, unsegmented body of a mechanical bridge.
shape
Same as position. "She got good shape for the next shot". See also position play, leave.
shaper
A highly abrasive tip tool used to shape an unreasonably flat new cue tip, or a misshapen old one, into a more usable, consistently curved profile, most commonly the curvature of a nickel or dime (or equivalently sized non-US/Canadian coin) for larger and smaller pool tips, respectively. Similar to a scuffer, but deeper and rougher.
shark

1. Verb: To perform some act or make some utterance with the intent to distract, irritate or intimidate the opponent so that they do not perform well, miss a shot, etc. Most league and tournament rules forbid blatant sharking, as a form of unsportsmanlike conduct, but it is very common in bar pool.
2. Noun: Another term for hustler.
3. Noun: A very good player. This usage is common among non-players who often intend it as a compliment and are not aware of its derogatory senses (above).
sharp
Chiefly British: Same as shark (senses 1, 2). The term appears in lyrics from The Mikado (1884) in relation to billiards, and developed from sharper (in use by at least 1681, but now obsolete) meaning "hustler" but not specific to billiards. See also card sharp for more etymological details and sources.
short rack
Any pool game that uses a rack composed of less than 15 balls.
short rail
When playing a shot, the two rails nearest to the pocket on a standard pool, billiards or snooker table. Compare end rail; contrast side rail/long rail.
shortstop
Also short stop, short-stop. A second-tier professional who is not (yet) ready for World Championship competition. It can also be applied by extension to a player who is one of the best in a region but not quite good enough to consistently beat serious road players and tournament pros. The term was borrowed from baseball.
shot
Verb form: to shoot. The use of the cue to perform or attempt to perform a particular motion of balls on the table, such as to pocket (pot) an object ball, to achieve a successful carom (cannon), or to play a safety.
shot for nothing
Also shot to nothing. A predominantly British term for a shot in which a player attempts a difficult pot but with safety in mind, so that in the event of missing the pot it is likely that the opponent will not make a meaningful contribution, and will probably have to reply with a safety. The meaning refers to lack of risk, i.e. at no cost to the player ("for nothing" or coming "to nothing"). Compare two-way shot.
shot program
Also (chiefly British) shot programme. The enumerated trick shots that must be performed in the fields of artistic billiards (70 pre-determined shots) and artistic pool (56 tricks in eight "disciplines").
side
Chiefly British: Short for side spin. In Canadian usage, the term is sometimes used as a verb, "to side".
side pocket
One of the two pockets one either side of a pool table halfway up the long rails. They are cut shallower than corner pockets because they have a 180-degree aperture, instead of 90 degrees. In the UK the term centre pocket or middle pocket are preferred.
side rail
Either of the two longer rails of a billiards table, bisected by a center pocket and bounded at both ends by a corner pocket. Also called a long rail.
side spin
Also sidespin, side-spin, side. Spin placed on the cue ball when hit with the cue tip to the left or right of the ball's center; usually called english in American usage. See english, in its narrower definition, for details on the effects of side spin. See illustration at spin.
sight
Chiefly British; same as diamond.
single-elimination
Also single elimination. A tournament format in which a player is out of the tournament after a single match loss. Contrast double-elimination.
single table format
Also single table set-up. In the final stages of a tournament, primarily snooker events, where other tables are removed, to use one single table for the final, or later rounds of the tournament. Some events, such as the Snooker Shoot Out, are played throughout using a single table format.
sink
Same as pocket (sense 2).
sink-in shot
Any shot that intentionally accounts for the elasticity of the cushions to allow a ball to bank past an otherwise blocking ball. The moving ball will sink in to the cushion very near the blocking ball giving it sufficient space to get past it or kiss off the back side of it.
sitter
Chiefly British: Same as duck, and stemming from the same obvious etymology.
six-ball
1.
A variation of nine-ball but played with only six balls, and the 6 ball as the game ball or "money ball". Six-ball has no notable professional competition.
2. The spelled-out name of the 6 ball.
skid
British: Same as cling, and kick, sense 2. Noun, verb and rare adjective usage as per "cling".
skittle
An upright object resembling a miniature bowling pin, cone or obelisk. Skittles, as employed in billiards games, have been so-called since at least 1634. One standardized size, for the game five-pins, is 25 mm (1 in.) tall, with 7 mm (0.28 in.) round bases, though larger variants have long existed for other games such as Danish pin billiards. Depending upon the game there may be one skittle, or several, and they may be targets to hit (often via a carom) or obstacles to avoid, usually the former. They are also sometimes called pins, though that term can be ambiguous. Because of the increasing international popularity of the game five-pins, which originated in Italy, they are sometimes also known by their Italian name, birillo (plural birilli), even in English. Skittles are also used as obstacles in some artistic billiards shots. Flat, thin rectangular skittles, like large plastic dominoes, approximately 6 in. tall by 3 in. wide, and placed upright like obelisks on the table in specific spots, are used as targets or hazards (mostly the latter) in the now-rare and principally Australian games devil's pool (ten white and two black pins) and victory billiards (one black pin, also featured in several scenes of the 1992 sci-fi/pool film Hard Knuckle). Skittles as used in billiards games date to ground billiards (13th century or earlier) played with a mace, and hand-thrown games of bowls from at least the same era using the same equipment. Ball games using a recognizable form of skittle are known from as early as ca. 3300 BCE in Ancient Egypt.
skunk
During a set if the opponent does not win a single game, they are said to have been skunked.
slate
The heavy, finely milled rock (slate) that forms the bed of the table, beneath the cloth. Major slate suppliers for the billiards industry are Italy, Brazil and China. Some cheaper tables, and novelty tables designed for outdoor use, do not use genuine slate beds, but artificial materials such as plastic-coated particleboard (some brands include Slatron and Permaslate), or medium-density fiberboard.
slide
Also, sliding ball (when used in gerund form). Describes a cue ball sliding on the cloth without any top spin or back spin on it.
slip stroke
A stroking technique in which a player releases their gripping hand briefly and re-grasps the cue farther back on the butt just before hitting the cue ball. Cowboy Jimmy Moore was a well-known practitioner of the slip stroke.
slop
1. Also slop shot. A luck shot. Compare fish and fluke; contrast mark (sense 3) and call.
2. Also sloppy. Descriptive of any game where the rules have been varied to allow luck shots not normally allowed or where no foul rules apply.
slop pockets
Pocket openings that are significantly wider than are typical and thus allow shots hit with a poor degree of accuracy to be made that would not be pocketed on a table with more exacting pocket dimensions.
slow
1. Describes a billiard table with loosely woven, dirty, too-new or worn-out cloth (baize), upon which the balls move slower and shorter distances. See table speed for more information.
2. Producing dull, sluggish action; said of cushions or of the balls, in addition to the above, cloth-related definition.
3. Unusually rejecting of balls; said of pockets; see pocket speed (sense 1) for more information. "Fast" is the direct opposite of "slow" in all of these usages.
small
Also smalls, small ones, small balls. In eight-ball, to be shooting the solid suit (group) of balls (1 through 7); "you're the small one" or "I've got the smalls". Compare little, solids, reds, low, spots, dots, unders; contrast big.
smash and pray
A variant of hit and hope, but played with unnecessary force, in hopes that the undesirable ball layout on the table is sufficiently re-arranged by careening balls that something good will result for the shooter (even if it is simply a bad leave for the incoming player).
smash-through
The effect of shooting regulation-weight object balls with an old-fashioned over-weight bar table cue ball, such that the cue ball moves forward to occupy (sometimes only temporarily), or go beyond, the original position of the object ball, even on a draw or stop shot, because the mass of the cue ball exceeds that of the object ball. Players who understand smash-through well can use it intentionally for position play, such as to nudge other object balls nearby the target ball. Smash-through also makes it dangerous in bar pool (when equipped with such a cue ball) to pocket straight-on ducks with a stop shot instead of by cheating the pocket because of the likelihood of scratching the cue ball.
snap
Same as break, sense 1. See also on the snap.
sneaky Pete
A two-piece cue constructed to resemble a house cue, with a near-invisible wood-to-wood joint. The subterfuge often enables a hustler to temporarily fool unsuspecting fish into thinking that they are an unskilled banger with no regard for finesse or equipment quality. Many league players also use cheap but solid sneaky petes as their break cues.
snick
A British term for a pot that requires very fine contact between cue ball and object ball. See also feather.
snooker
1.

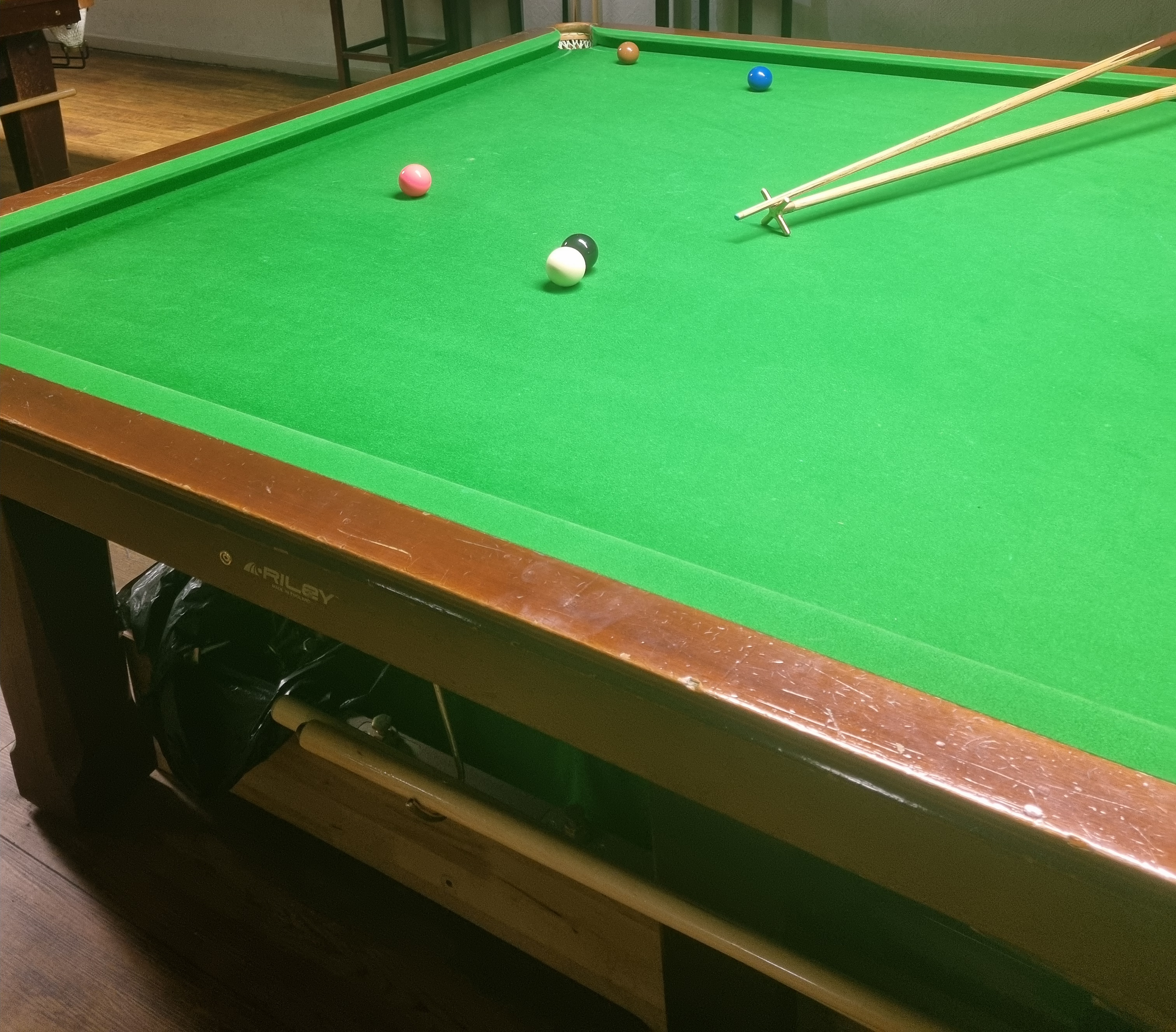
Playing the brown ball, the player is snookered behind the black ball.

(noun) The game of snooker.
2. (verb) To leave the opponent (accidentally or by means of a safety) so that a certain shot on a preferred object ball cannot be played directly in a straight line by normal cueing. It most commonly means that the object ball cannot be hit easily, because it is hidden by another ball or, more rarely, the knuckle of a pocket (see corner-hooked). It can also refer to the potting angle or another significant point of contact on the object ball, blocking an otherwise more straightforward shot, even if an edge can be seen. A common related adjective describing a player in this situation is snookered. Also known as "to hook", for which the corresponding adjective "hooked" is also common. See also free ball.
3. (noun) An instance of this situation (e.g. "she's put him in a difficult snooker"). A player can choose a range of shots to get out of a snooker; usually a kick shot will be implemented but semi-massés are often preferred, and in games where it is not a foul, jump shots may be employed that often yield good results for skilled players. "Snooker" is used loosely (when used at all; "hook" is favored) in the US, but has very specific definitions and subtypes (such as the total snooker) in blackball. See also safe.
snooker spectacles
Also snooker specs, snooker glasses. Same as billiards glasses.
snookers required
A stage in a frame of snooker where the points difference between the players exceeds the maximum number of points remaining on the table. The trailing player may either concede the frame at this stage or attempt to overcome the points deficit by securing penalty points from fouls, typically by placing the leading player in snookers. The number of snookers required is usually calculated as the number of four-point penalties that—in addition to the maximum points remaining on the table—would enable the trailing player to win the frame outright or tie the scores and force a re-spotted black. E.g., a player who trails by 42 points with 35 points remaining is said to "require two snookers" because two four-point fouls, in addition to the remaining 35 points, would enable that player to win the frame by one point. If the blue or pink is the lowest-valued ball remaining on the table, the number of snookers required is calculated in terms of five- or six-point penalties respectively. A free ball can also help a trailing player overcome a points deficit. When a player can at best tie with the points remaining on the table, the referee will no longer apply the miss rule should either player fail to escape from a snooker. The miss rule still applies at the snookers required stage if a player misses a ball while not snookered.
soft break
A break shot in which the rack (pack) is disturbed as little as possible within the bounds of a legal shot, in order to force the opponent to have to break it up further. A soft break is desirable in some games, such as straight pool, in which breaking is a disadvantage; and forbidden by the open break rules of other games such as nine-ball and eight-ball.
solids
Also solid, solid ones, solid balls. The non-striped ball suit (group) of a fifteen ball set that are numbered 1 through 7 and have a solid colour scheme (i.e., not including the 8 ball). As in, "I'm solid", or "you've got the solids". Compare lows, smalls, littles, reds, spots, dots, unders; contrast stripes.
special average
Abbreviation: SA. In carom billiards, the number that indicates the relation between the points and innings (points ÷ innings = SA) a player has made in a single match. E. g. 40 points in 10 innings is a SA of 4.000. Higher numbers indicate better players. See also general average.
speed
1. A player's skill level (subjectively) or numerical handicap (objectively).
2. Rapidity with which a ball, especially the cue ball is rolling on the table. See also pocket speed (sense 2), speed control.
3. Same as pocket speed (sense 1).
4. Same as table speed (cloth speed).
speed control
The use of the correct amount of cue ball speed in position play to achieve proper shape for a subsequent shot.
speed-induced throw
Throw (object-ball deflection away from the tangent line path of the object ball), induced by ball-against-ball friction being increased by a slow-speed shot prolonging the short length of time the two balls are in contact. A faster, harder shot can be used to avoid this effect, as it reduces the contact time and also reduces the object-ball friction on the cloth so that side spin it has picked up from the impact has less wheel-like, path-curving effect. Speed-induced throw can also be countered to some extent with top spin (follow) or bottom spin (draw), which help resist the object ball's inclination to pick up side-spin that will alter its path (cut-induced throw). See throw for more details.
spider

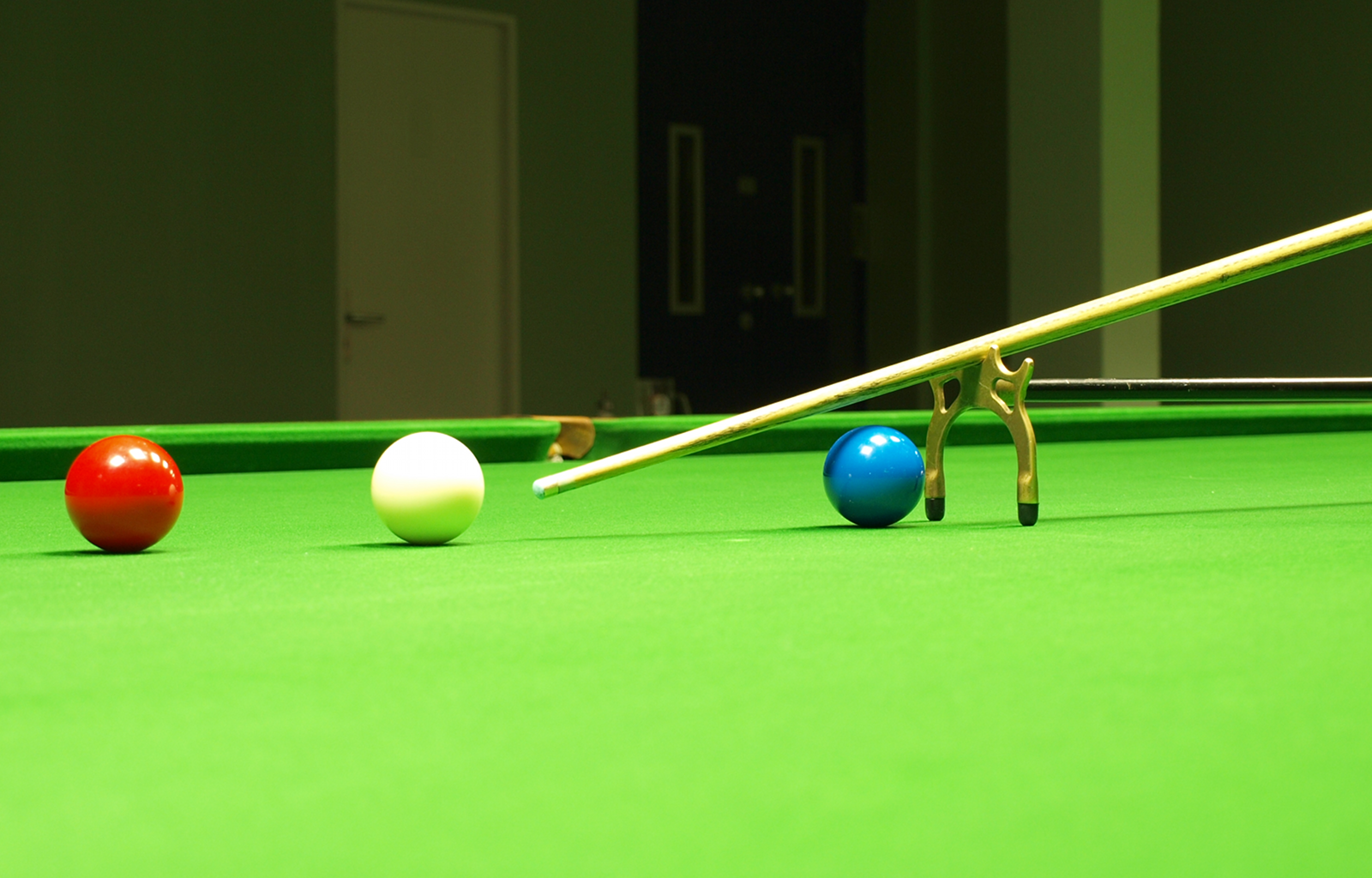
Using a "spider" rest to raise the cue stick over an obstructing blue ball

Also spider rest. A type of rest, similar to a common American-style rake bridge but with longer legs supporting the head so that the cue is higher and can reach over and around an obstructing ball to reach the cue ball. See also swan.
spin

Basic cue tip contact points on the cue ball to impart various forms of spin; top spin is also known as follow, side spin as english, and bottom spin as back spin, draw, or screw.

Rotational motion applied to a ball, especially to the cue ball by the tip of the cue, although if the cue ball is itself rotating it will impart (opposite) spin (in a lesser amount) to a contacted object ball. Types of spin include top spin, bottom or back spin (also known as draw or screw), and left and right side spin, all with widely differing and vital effects. Collectively, they are often referred to in American English as "english", though the term is often reserved for side spin only. The popular introduction of controlled spin in billiards is credited to François Mingaud. See also massé.
spin-induced throw
Also english-induced throw: Throw (object-ball deflection away from the tangent line path of the object ball), induced by ball-against-ball friction being increased by side spin (english) cue ball that is in the same direction as the natural throw angle of the object ball, which also induced a small amount of rolling curve to the path of that object ball. (Technically, an intermediary spinning object ball can also induce some throw on the final object ball, though an intentionally spun cue ball can have more much side spin and thus a more noticeable effect.) Application of precise opposite spin (gearing outside english) can counter this effect along with that of cut-induced throw. See throw for more details.
split
1. Also split shot and split hit. In pool, a type of shot in which two object balls are initially contacted by the cue ball simultaneously or so close to simultaneously as for the difference to be indistinguishable to the eye. In most sets of rules it is a foul if the split is one in which one of the object balls is a (or the only) legal target (ball-on) and the other is not; however, such a split is commonly considered a legal shot in informal bar pool in many areas if it is called as a split and does appear to strike the balls simultaneously.
2. In pool, the degree to which racked balls move apart upon impact by the cue ball as a result of a break shot.
3. In snooker, a shot sending the cue ball into the pack of red balls and separating them (after potting the ball-on). At least one split is usually necessary in each frame, since the original triangle of reds does not allow any balls to be potted reliably.
spot (noun)
1. spot, a: In pool games such as nine-ball, a specific handicap given (e.g., "what spot will you give me?").
2. spot, a: In snooker, any of the six designated points on the table on which a colour ball is replaced after it has left the playing surface (usually after it has been potted).
3. spot, a: An (often unmarked) point on the table, at the intersection of two strings. See foot spot, head spot, center spot for examples.
4. spots: Alternate name for a table's diamonds (sights).
5. spot, the: Also spot ball, spotted ball, the spot. In carom billiards and English billiards, the second player's cue ball, which for the shooting player is another object ball along with the red. Contrast the white ball, the starting player's cue ball.
6. spots: Also spot balls, spotted balls, the spots. Chiefly British. In a numbered pool ball set, the group of seven balls, other than the black, that are a solid colour with the number on the ball inside a small white spot on the otherwise solid-coloured surface. Also referred to as solids; chiefly American colloquialisms are lows, littles and smalls, while alternative British terms include dots and unders. Contrast stripes.
7. spot, the: Short for black spot.
spot (verb)
1. In pool, return an illegally pocketed object ball to the table by placement on the foot spot or as near to it as possible without moving other balls (in ways that may differ from ruleset to ruleset).
2. In snooker, to return a colour ball to its designated spot on the table. Also called re-spot.
3. In nine-ball, the giving of a handicap to the opponent where they can also win by making a ball or balls other than the 9 ball (e.g. "she spotted me the seven ball").
4. In eight-ball, one-pocket and straight pool, the giving of a handicap to the opponent where they have to make fewer balls than their opponent does.
5. In some variants of pool, to place the cue ball on the head spot or as near to it as possible inside the kitchen/baulk, after the opponent has scratched.
spot boy
In English billiards, a person appointed to re-spot the red ball after it has been potted.
spot shot
The situation arising in many pool games where a ball is spotted to the table's foot spot or some other specific location and the cue ball must be shot from the kitchen or the "D". There are diamond system aiming techniques for pocketing such shots without scratching the cue ball into a pocket.
spot stroke
Also spot-stroke, spot hazard. A form of nurse shot in English billiards, in which the red ball – which must be spotted to a specific location after each time it is potted, prior to the next shot being taken – is potted in such a way as to leave the cue ball in position to repeat the same shot, permitting a skilled player to rack up many points in a single break of these shots in one visit.
squeeze shot
Any shot in which the cue ball or an object ball has to squeeze by (just miss with almost no margin for error) another ball or balls in order to reach its intended target.
squirt
Same as cue-ball deflection. Squirt has also been applied metaphorically in sports journalism and the gaming press to describe the escape of a ball or puck from player control. However, it remains primarily a cue-sports technical term, and does not appear to be frequently used as jargon in football, hockey, or other sports.
stake
1. (noun) A player's wager in a money game. Contrast pot, definition 3.
2. (verb) To provide part or all of a player's stake for a gambling session in which one is not a player, i.e. to be a stakehorse for the player. Same as back.
stakehorse
One who stakes (monetarily backs) a gambling player; a.k.a. backer. "Stakehorse" can also be used as a verb.
stall
1. To intentionally hide one's "speed" (skill); "he's on the stall."
2. To intentionally play slowly so as to irritate one's opponent. This form of sharking has been eliminated from many tournaments with a shot clock, and from many leagues with time-limit rules.
stance
A shooter's body position and posture during a shot. See also cue action.
stay shot
In the UK, a long-distance shot played to pot a ball close to a pocket with heavy top spin, so that when the cue ball hits the cushion it bounces off but then stops due to the counteraction of the spin. It is not common in competitive play, being more of an exhibition shot.
steering
The lamentable practice of not following through with the cue straight, but veering off in the direction of the shot's travel or the side english is applied, away from the proper aiming line; a common source of missed shots.
stick
Same as cue.
stop shot
Any shot where the cue ball stops immediately after hitting an object ball. Generally requires a full hit.
straight eight
Also straight eight-ball. Same as bar pool. Not to be confused with the games of straight pool or straight rail.
straight up
To play even; without a handicap. Also called heads up.
strike rate
In snooker, the average number of frames per century for a given player.
string
1. A (usually unmarked) line running across the table between one diamond and its corresponding diamond on the opposite rail. See also head string, foot string, long string for examples.
2. Same as scoring string, a.k.a. wire sense 2. Can be used as a verb, as in "string that point for me, will you?"
3. A successive series of wins, e.g. of games or frames in a match or race.
4. Chiefly British; same as lag.
5. A metaphor for precise control, as in Having the cue ball on a string.
string-off
Also string off. Obsolete: Same as string, sense 4, and lag.
stripes
Also striped ones, striped balls. The ball suit (group) of a fifteen ball set that are numbered 9 through 15 and have a wide coloured bar around the middle. Compare bigs, highs, yellows, overs; contrast solids.
stroke
1. The motion of the cue stick and the player's arm on a shot;
2. The strength, fluidity and finesse of a player's shooting technique; "she has a good stroke."
3. See In stroke: A combination of finesse, good judgement, accuracy and confidence.
stroke, catch a
To suddenly be in stroke after poor prior play; "she caught a stroke."
stroke, to be in
See In stroke.
stun run-through
A shot played with stun, but not quite enough to completely stop the cue ball, allowing for a little follow. It is played so that a follow shot can be controlled more reliably, with a firmer strike than for a slow roll. It is widely considered as one of the most difficult shots in the game to master, but an excellent weapon in a player's armory once it has been.
stun shot
A shot where the cue ball has no top spin or back spin on it when it impacts an object ball, and "stuns" out along the tangent line. Commonly shortened to just "stun."
sucker shot
A shot that only a novice or fool would take. Usually because it is a guaranteed scratch or other foul, or because it has a low percentage of being pocketed and is likely to leave the opponent in good position.
suit
A (principally American) term in eight-ball for either of the set of seven balls (stripes or solids) that must be cleared before sinking the 8 ball. Borrowed from card games. Generally used in the generic, especially in rulesets or articles, rather than colloquially by players. See also group for the British equivalent.
surgeon
A player skilled at very thin cut shots, and shots in which a ball must pass cleanly through a very narrow space (such as the cue ball between two of the opponent's object balls with barely enough room) to avoid a foul and/or to pocket a ball. Such shots may be referred to as "surgery", "surgical shots", "surgical cuts", etc. (chiefly US, colloquial). See also feather (US) or snick (UK).
swan

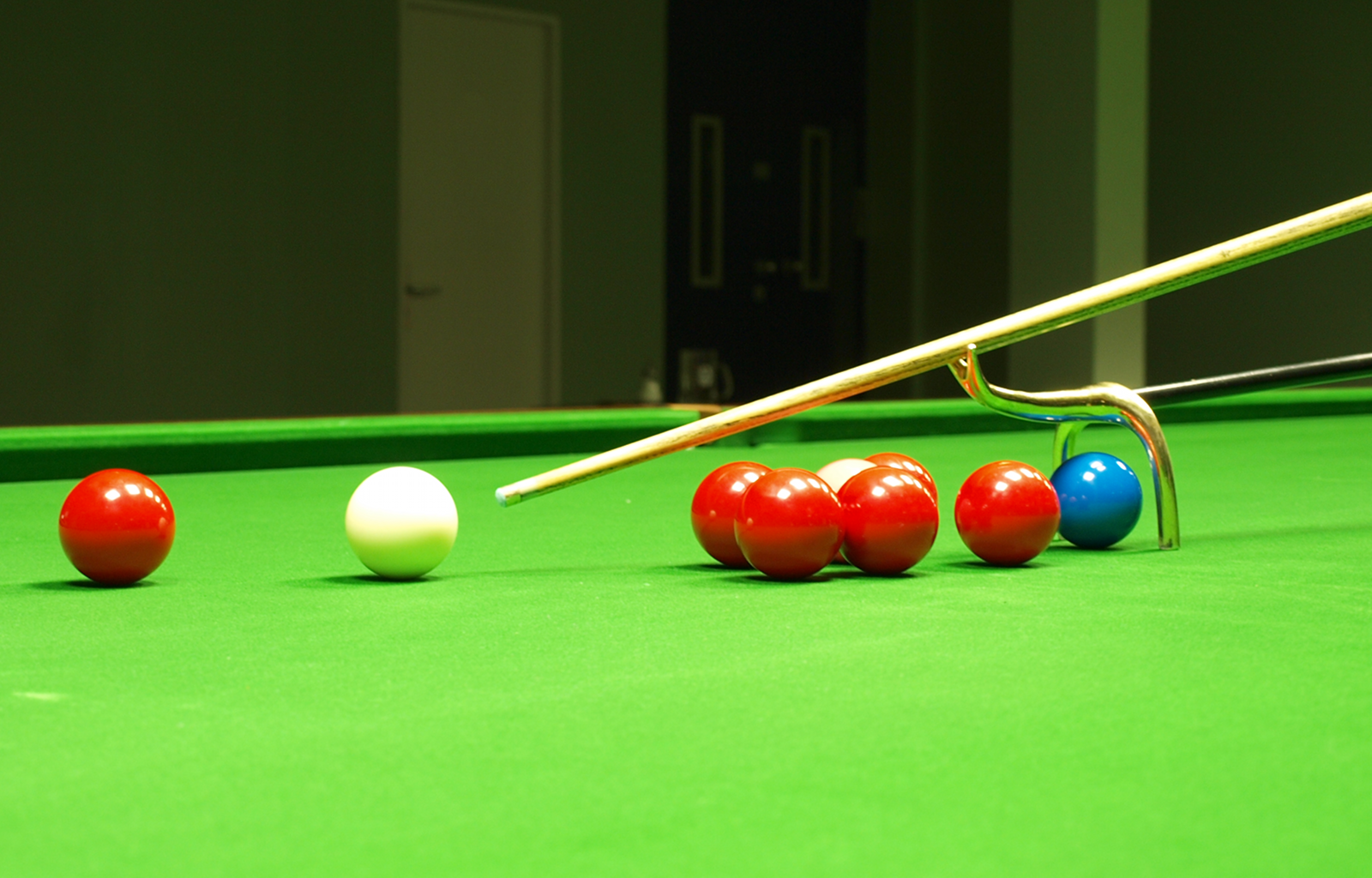
Using a "swan" rest to raise the cue stick over obstructing balls

Also swan rest. A type of rest, similar to a spider in that the head is raised by longer supporting legs, but instead of a selection of grooves on the top for the cue to rest in there is only one, on the end of an overhanging neck, so that a player can get to the cue ball more easily if the path is blocked by two or more obstructing balls. Also known as the goose neck.
sweaters
Those who are stakehorsing a match or have side bets on it and are "sweating the action", i.e. nervous about its outcome.
swerve
An unintentional and often barely perceptible curve imparted to the path of the cue ball from the use of english without a level cue. Not to be confused with a swerve shot.
swerve shot
Same as semi-massé. Compare curve shot.

== T ==
table cloth
Same as cloth.
table roll
A flaw in the table, such as lack of leveling, loose cloth at the fall of a pocket, a divot in the bed, etc., that causes a ball, especially a slow-moving one, to not roll or settle as expected.
table run
See run the table.
table scratch
1. Failure to hit any legal object ball at all with the cue ball. In most sets of rules, this is a foul like any other. However, in some variants of bar pool a table scratch while shooting for the 8 ball is a loss of game where other more minor fouls might not be, as is scratching on the 8 ball (neither result in a loss of game in professional and most amateur league rules).
2. By way of drift from the above definition, the term is also applied by many league players to the foul in more standardized rules of failing to drive a (any) ball to a cushion, or to pocket a legal object ball, after the cue ball's initial contact with an object ball.
3. Uncommonly, and by way of entirely different derivation ("scratch off the table"), it can also mean knocking the cue ball (or more loosely, any ball) completely off the table.
table speed
Subjective assessment of the rapidity with which balls move on the billiard table's cloth (baize). Balls roll faster and farther on "fast" tables with tightly woven, broken-in, clean cloth as they experience less friction than with "slow" cloth that is dirty or is fuzzy because of a loose weave and cheap material or because it is wearing out. The terms may be used comparatively, as in "this is a really fast table", or "I don't like cloth this slow". Fast cloth can make draw (screw) shots somewhat less effective, as there is less purchase for the cue ball's back spin. On the other hand, slide and stop shots are easier on fast cloth because it is so comparatively smooth. Sometimes called cloth speed.
talc
Also hand talc. White talcum powder placed on a player's bridge hand to reduce moisture so that a cue's shaft can slide more easily. Many establishments do not provide it as too many recreational players will use far more than is necessary and transfer it all over the table's surface, the floor, furniture, etc. Venues that do provide it usually do so in the form of compressed cones about 6 inches tall. Some serious players bring their own, in a bottle or a porous bag that can be patted on the bridge hand. Many players prefer a pool glove. Talc is frequently mistakenly referred to as "hand chalk", despite not being made of chalk.
tangent line
The imaginary line drawn perpendicular to the impact line between the cue ball and an object ball. The cue ball will travel along this line after impact with an object ball if it has no vertical spin on it (is sliding) at the moment of impact on a non-center-to-center collision. See also stun shot and ghost ball.
tank
To purposefully lose games in order to gain a better draft selection or to be more competitive in the future. This is usually performed when a team is out of or unlikely to take part in a league's postseason.
taper
The profile of the shaft of the cue as it increases in diameter from the tip to the joint. A "fast" or "slow" taper refers to how quickly the diameter increases. A "pro" taper describes a shaft that tapers rapidly from the joint size to the tip size so as to provide a long, untapered stroking area.
tapper
A tip tool with fine, sharp points used to roughen the cue tip to better hold chalk after it has become hardened and smooth from repeated impacts with the cue ball. Tappers are firmly tapped on or pressed against the tip. Scuffers serve the same purpose, but are used differently.
template
1. See pocket template.
2. See racking template.
3. See training template.
ten-ball
1.
An outgrowth of nine-ball to make a more challenging game, it is a rotation game played with ten object balls and with the 10 ball as the game ball or "money ball". It is played by most of the same rules as nine-ball (especially that the lowest-numbered object ball remaining on the table must always be struck first by the cue ball), but differs (in the WPA standardized rules) in that shots must be called.
2. The spelled-out name of the 10 ball.
thin
See overcut.
three-ball
1.
An amateur multi-player (and often gambling) game, played with three object balls, racked either in a triangle or a straight line toward the end rail from the foot spot. The game is played by each player trying to pocket all three balls (the same player remaining at the table until this is done) in as few shots as possible and without incurring any fouls. Luck plays a more significant role in this game than usual, due to the possibility of pocketing two or even all three balls on the break shot.
2. The spelled-out name of the 3 ball.
three-foul rule
The three-foul rule describes a situation in which a player is assessed a defined penalty after committing a third successive foul. The exact penalty, its prerequisites and whether it is in place at all, vary depending on the games. In nine-ball and straight pool, a player must be the told they are on two fouls in order to transgress the rule, and if violated, results in a loss of game for in former, and a special point penalty of a loss of fifteen points (plus one for the foul itself) in the latter together with the ability to require the violator to rerack and rebreak. In WEPF eight-ball, it is a loss of game if a player commits a third foul while shooting at the black. In snooker, three successive fouls from a non-snookered position result in forfeiting the frame. Repeat fouls from a snookered position are quite common – Dave Harold holds the record in a competitive match, missing the same shot 14 successive times.
throw
The normal phenomenon, present to some degree on all cut shots, whereby the object ball is pushed in a direction slight off the pure "ghost ball" contact angle between the two balls. Throw is caused by the friction imparted from the first, moving ball sliding or rotating against the second, stationary ball. Same as object-ball deflection. While throw is most easily observed between the cue ball and an object ball, it also happens between two or more object balls, which is one of the factors that makes combination shots challenging. The amount of this deflection of an object ball from its expected path is increased by several things, including by dirty or pitted balls that briefly grip each other more, by a thick cut-shot angle that provides for extended friction between the balls (cut-induced throw), by slow ball-contact speed (speed-induced throw) for the same reason, by stun shots for the same reason, and by the object ball being impacted by a ball that is rapidly side-spinning (spin- or english-induced throw), which causes the object ball to roll in a curve more toward that throw direction. Throw is reduced by higher-speed impact, by draw or follow (bottom or top spin), and by side-spin counter to the direction of the natural throw. Skilled players thus often shoot cut shots with a small amount of outside english – gearing outside English – to neutralize the cut-induced throw that widens the shot away from the tangent line, though other techniques may be required instead or in combination with that, depending on the desired cue-ball position at the end of the shot.
tickie
A shot in which the cue ball is driven first to one or more rails, then hits an object ball and kisses back to the last rail contacted. It is a common shot in carom games, but can be applied to such an instance in any relevant cue sport. In pool, it is most often used as a form of short-distance clearance shot.
tied up
Describing a ball that is safe because it is in close proximity to one or more other balls, and would need to be developed before it becomes pottable.
tight
1. Describing a situation where a pot is made more difficult, either by a pocket being partially blocked by another ball so that not all of it is available, or the cue ball path to the object ball's potting angle involves going past another ball very closely.
2. Describing pockets that are themselves narrower than average, making for a more challenging table.
3. Chiefly British: A resting ball that is in actual contact with a cushion is said to be "tight" to that cushion. The chiefly American term "frozen" means the same thing, except that it can also apply to a ball in contact with one or more other balls rather than with a cushion.
time shot
Any shot in which the cue ball moves another ball to a different position and then rebounds off one or more rails to contact the object ball again (normally in an attempt to pocket it or score a billiard).
timing
The ease with which a player generates cue power, due to well-timed acceleration of the cue at the appropriate point in a shot.
tip
Same as cue tip.
tip clamp
A small clamping tip tool used to firmly hold and apply pressure to a replacement cue tip until the glue holding the tip to the ferrule has fully dried.
tip tool
Also tiptool, tip-tool. Any of a class of maintenance tools for cue tips, including shapers, scuffers, mushroom trimmers, tappers, burnishers and tip clamps. Road, league and tournament players often carry an array of tip tools in their cases. The term is not applied to cue chalk.
titty
Also tittie; plural titties. Same as knuckle. By analogy to the human breast.
titty-hooked
Also tittie-hooked. Same as corner-hooked.
ton
In snooker, same as century.
top
1. Chiefly British: The half of the table in which the object balls are racked (in games that use racked balls). This usage is conceptually opposite that in North America, where this end of the table is called the foot. In snooker, this is where the reds are racked, nearest the black spot; this is the area in which most of the game is usually played. Contrast bottom.
2. Chiefly American: Exactly the opposite of the British usage above – the head end of the table. No longer in common usage.
3. Short for top spin, i.e. same as follow.
top cushion
Chiefly British: The cushion on the top rail. Compare foot cushion (U.S.); contrast bottom cushion.
top-of-the-table play
This technique involves all three balls being grouped in close proximity at the top end of the table and scoring with a succession of short-range pots and cannons. A typical starting point is with the red placed on its spot, object white on or near the centreline somewhere between the spot and the top cushion, and the cueball posed nearby to pot the red or make a gentle cannon. If the pot, then it should be played so as to leave the cueball in a good position for the next shot. If the cannon, then the purpose is to disturb the object white as little as possible and finish clear to pot the red that has been left near the corner pocket. Then in potting the red the cueball must again be left in a good position for the next shot, and so on. This form of play makes it possible to compile really big breaks in relatively short time.
top rail
Chiefly British: The rail at the top of the table. Compare foot rail (U.S.); contrast bottom rail.
top spin

Same as follow. Contrast bottom spin, back spin. See illustration at spin.
total clearance
A term used in snooker for the potting of all the balls that are racked at the beginning of the frame in a single break (run). The minimum total clearance affords 72 points (barring multiple reds being potted on a single stroke), in the pattern of red then yellow repeatedly until all reds are potted, then all of the colour balls. The maximum break is 147 (barring a foul by the opponent immediately before the break began).
total snooker
In blackball, a situation where the player cannot see any of the balls she/he wants to hit due to obstruction by other balls or the knuckle of a pocket. The player must call "total snooker" to the referee, which allows a dispensation to the player from having to hit a cushion after contacting the object ball, which is otherwise a foul.
touching ball

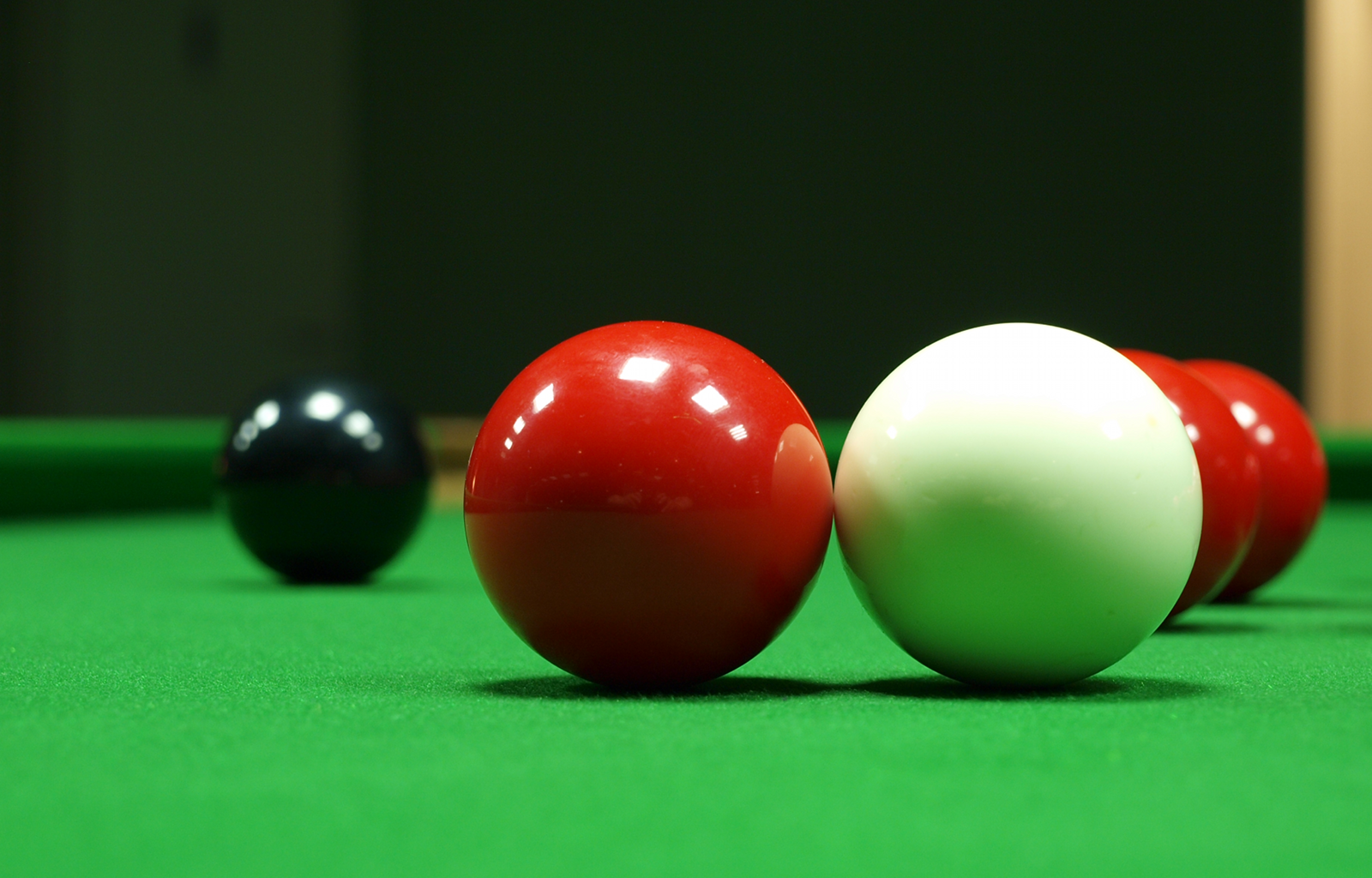
Touching ball with red ball

In snooker, the situation in which the cue ball is resting in contact with an object ball. If the object ball is a ball that may legally be hit, then it is allowable to simply hit away from it and it counts as having hit it in the shot. If that ball moves, then a push shot must have occurred, in which case it is a foul. This rule is sometimes applied to British pool as well as snooker. In American-style pool, and in carom billiards, a less stringent definition of a push shot applies; see frozen.
tournament card
Jargon for a tournament chart, showing which players are playing against whom and what the results are. Often shortened to card.
treble
Same as triple.
treble century
Same as triple century.
training template

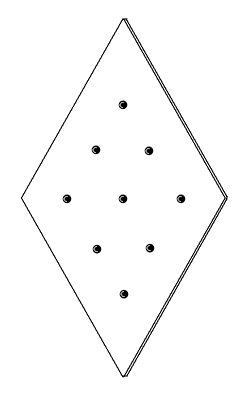
Training template

A thin sheet of rigid material in the size and shape of a physical ball rack (e.g. a diamond for nine-ball), with holes drilled though it, which is used to make permanent divots in the cloth of the table, one at a time for each ball in the racking pattern, by placing the template on the table, and then a ball in one of the holes in the template by tapping it sharply from above to create the cloth indentation. The holes are spaced slightly closer than the regulation ball width of 2^{1}/_{2} inch (57.15 mm) apart, so that when the balls settle partially into their divots, the outer sides of these indentations create ball-on-ball pressure, pushing the balls together tightly. The purpose of the template is to do away with using a physical rack, with racking instead being performed simply by placing the balls into position, and the divots aligning them into the tightest possible formation automatically. This prevents accidental loose racks, and also thwarts the possibility of cheating by manipulating the ball positions while racking. The European Pocket Billiard Federation (EPBF, Europe's WPA affiliate organization) has adopted this racking technique for its professional Euro-Tour event series. See also racking template, pocket template.
triangle

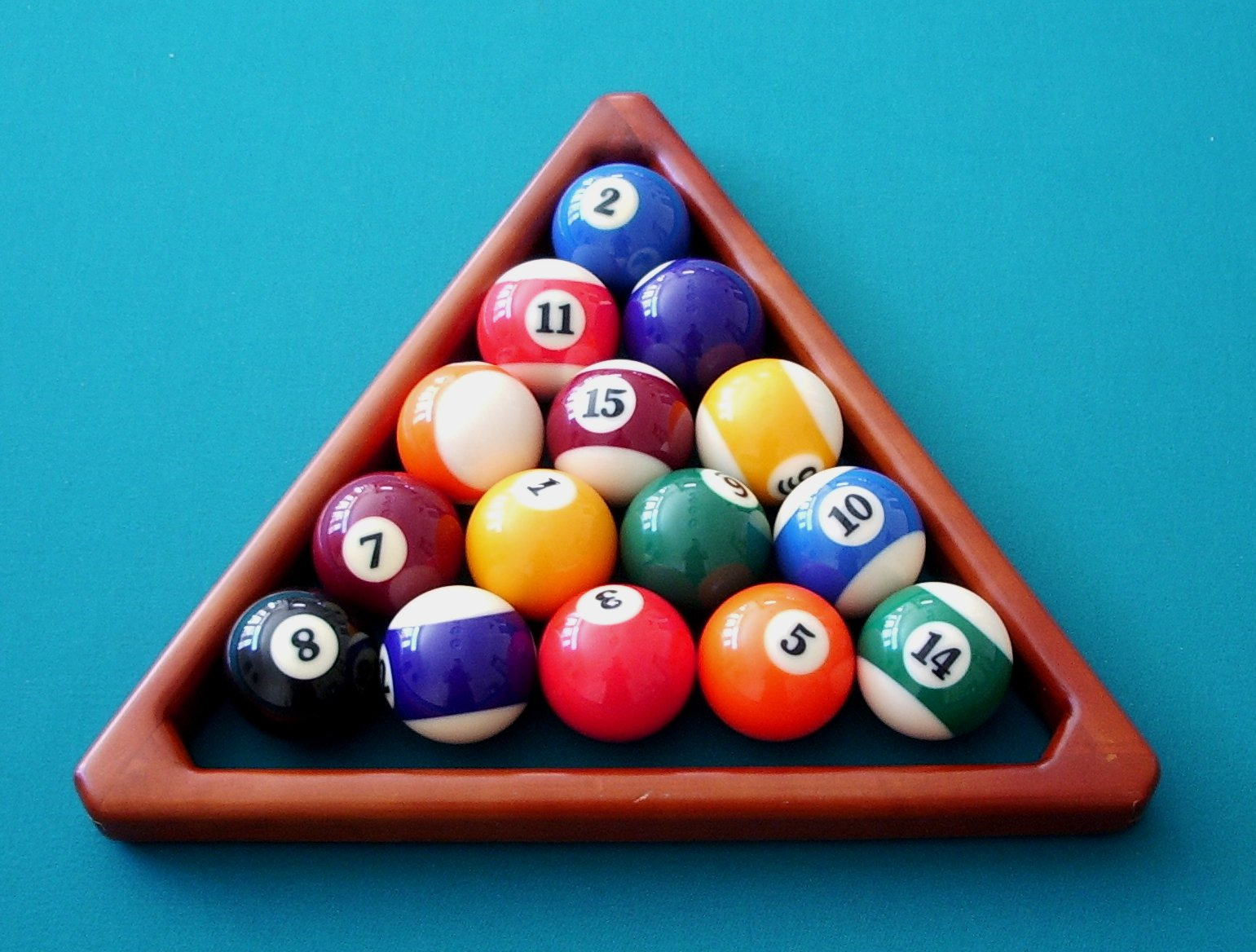
Racking up a game of cribbage pool using the triangle rack, with the 15 ball in the middle, no two corner balls adding up to 15, and the apex ball on the foot spot

1. A rack in the form of an equilateral triangle. There are different sizes of triangles for racking different games (which use different ball sizes and numbers of balls), including the fifteen ball racks for snooker and various pool games such as eight-ball and blackball. A larger triangle is used for the twenty-one ball rack for baseball pocket billiards. The smallest triangle rack is employed in three-ball (see illustration at that article) but is not strictly necessary, as the front of a larger rack can be used, or the balls can be arranged by hand. 2. The object balls in triangular formation, before the break shot, after being racked as above (i.e., same as rack, definition 2). Principally British. (See also pyramid.)
trick shot
An exhibition shot designed to impress either by a player's skill or knowledge of how to set the balls up and take advantage of the angles of the table; usually a combination of both. A trick shot may involve items otherwise never seen during the course of a game, such as bottles, baskets, etc. being placed on or around the table.
triple
Also treble. A British term for a type of bank shot in which the object ball is potted off two cushions, especially by sending it twice across the table and into a side pocket. Also called a two-cushion double.
triple century

See double century.
turn
Same as visit.
two-cushion double
Same as triple.
two-pot-rule
In English billiards, the rule that the red ball should be placed on the centre spot if it has been potted twice in succession from its own spot.
two-shot carry
A rule in blackball whereby after an opponent has faulted and thus yielded two shots, if the incoming shooter pots a ball on the first shot, (s)he is still allowed to miss in a later shot and take a second shot in-hand (from the "D" or from baulk, or if the opponent potted the cue ball, from anywhere)—even on the black, in most variants. Also called the "two visits" rule; i.e., the two penalty shots are considered independent visits to the table, and the limiting variants discussed at two shots below cannot logically apply.
two shots
In blackball, a penalty conceded by a player after a fault. The incoming opponent is then allowed to miss twice before the faulting player is allowed another visit. Many local rules state the in-hand from the D (see D, the) or baulk (or if the opponent potted the cue ball, from anywhere) nature of the second shot is lost if a ball is potted on the first shot, that it is lost if the ball potted in the first shot was that player's last coloured ball (object ball in their group), and/or that there is only ever one shot on the black after a fault. See two-shot carry for more detail on a sub-rule that may apply (and eliminate the variations discussed here).
two visits
See two-shot carry.
two-way shot
1. A shot in which if the target is missed, the opponent is safe or will not have a desirable shot;
2. A shot in which there are two ways to score;
3. A shot in which a second ball is targeted to be pocketed, broken out of a cluster, repositioned or some other secondary goal is also intended.

== U ==
umbrella shot
A three cushion billiards shot in which the cue ball first strikes two cushions before hitting the first object ball then hits a third cushion before hitting the second object ball. So called because the shot opens up like an umbrella after hitting the third rail. Umbrella shots may be classified as inside or outside depending on which side of the first object ball the cue ball contacts.
umpire
Chiefly American, and largely obsolete: Same as referee. Derives from the usage in baseball.
undercut

1 To hit the object ball with not enough of a cut angle; hitting the object ball too full or "fat". It is a well-known maxim that overcutting is preferable to undercutting because of the principle of the "professional side of the pocket". May be used as a noun: "That was a bad undercut."
2. On snooker and English billiards tables, to trim back (usually by filing and sanding, not actually cutting) the underside of the protruding knuckle of the cushion, a.k.a. the nose of the cushion, from where the cushion starts to curve into the pocket until it ends inside the pocket jaws. The result is a cushion face at the knuckle that angles inward toward where the base of the rail meets the bed of the table, instead of one that is perpendicular to the bed. At this point behaves more like a triangular pool cushion profile, with its "backboard" effect, than an upside-down L-shaped snooker cushion profile. Undercut knuckles make for an easier pocket to pot balls in from an angle – a "faster pocket speed" – because they raise the contact point between cushion and ball to above the centre of the ball, reducing the tendency of the ball to be rebounded away. Also used as a noun: "The amount of the undercut has a major effect on pocket playability."
unders
Same as solids, in New Zealand. Compare little, small, reds, low, spots, dots; contrast overs.
unintentional english
Inadvertent english placed on the cue ball by a failure to hit it dead center on its horizontal axis. It is both a common source of missed shots and commonly overlooked when attempts are made to determine the reason for a miss. In UK parlance this is usually called 'unwanted side'.
up-table
Toward the head of the table.

== V ==
velcro
A British term describing when a ball is tight on the cushion and a player sends the cue ball to hit both the object ball and the rail at nearly the same time; the object ball, ideally, stays tight to the rail and is thus "velcroed" to the rail. Inside english is often employed to achieve this effect, hitting slightly before the ball. The movement of a ball just next to the rail (but not the shot described to achieve this movement) is called hugging the rail in both the UK and the US.
visit
One of the alternating turns players (or doubles teams) are allowed at the table, before a shot is played that concedes a visit to their opponent (e.g. "he ran out in one visit"). Usually synonymous with inning as applied to a single player/team, except in scotch doubles format.

== W ==
wall rack
1. A one-piece or two-piece item of wall-mounted furniture designed to store cue sticks and sometimes other accessories such as the mechanical bridge (rest), balls, chalk, etc., when not in use. May consist of two small pieces of wood, or be an elaborately decorative large work of carpentry. Contrast Cue stand.
2. Same as scoring rack.
warrior
An object ball positioned near a pocket so that another object ball shot at that pocket will likely go in off the warrior, even if aimed so imperfectly that if the warrior had been absent, the shot likely would have missed. Usually arises when a ball is being banked to the pocket.
way
1. Term for object balls in the game of Chicago that are each assigned as having a set money value; typically the 5, 8, 10, 13 and 15.
2. In games where multiple balls must be pocketed in succession to score a specific number of points, such as cribbage pool, when the last ball necessary to score has been potted, the points total given is referred to as a "way". This is a usage borrowed from card games.
weight
To "give someone weight" is to give them a handicap to compensate for notable differences in skill level. Compare spot (noun), sense 1.
white ball

1. Alternate name for the cue ball.
2. In carom billiards games and English billiards, a more specific term for the starting opponent's cue ball, which for the shooting player is another object ball along with the red. Contrast spot ball, the other player's cue ball.
whitewash
Principally British: In snooker, if a player wins all of the required frames in a match without conceding a frame to their opponent, for example, if a player wins a best-of-nine-frames match with a score of 5–0, this is referred to as a "whitewash". The term is based on a similar term used in the card game of "Patience" in the UK. However, it is not used in the context of a 1–0 winning scoreline in a match consisting of a single frame.
whitey
Alternate name for the cue ball.
wild
When a ball is given as a handicap it often must be called (generally tacit). A wild handicap means the ball can be made in any manner specifically without being called.
wing ball
Either of the balls on the lateral extremities of a racked set of balls in position for a break shot; the two balls at the outside of a 15-ball rack in the back row, or the balls to the left and right of the 9 ball in nine-ball's diamond rack-shaped opening setup position. In nine-ball it is seen as a reliable sign of a good break (which is normally taken from close to either cushion in the kitchen) if the opposite wing ball is pocketed. See also break box.
wing shot
Shooting at an object ball that is already in motion ("on the wing") at the moment of shooting and cue ball impact; it is a foul in most games, and usually only seen in trick shots and in speed pool.
winning hazard
Also winner, largely obsolete. A shot in which the cue ball is used to pot another ball. In snooker and most pool games doing this is known as potting, pocketing or sinking the targeted ball. The term derives from early forms of billiards where this hazard winning the player points, while losing hazards cost the player points. Whether the ball is an object ball or an opponent's cue ball depends upon the type of game (some have two cue balls). The move will score points in most (but not all) games in which hazards (as such) apply, such as English billiards (in which a "red winner" is the potting of the red ball and a "white winner" the potting of the opponent's cue ball, each worth a different number of points). Contrast losing hazard.
wipe its feet
British term referring to the base or metaphorical "feet" of a ball that rattles in the jaws of a pocket before eventually dropping. Usually said of an object ball for which the intention was to pot it.
wire, the
1.

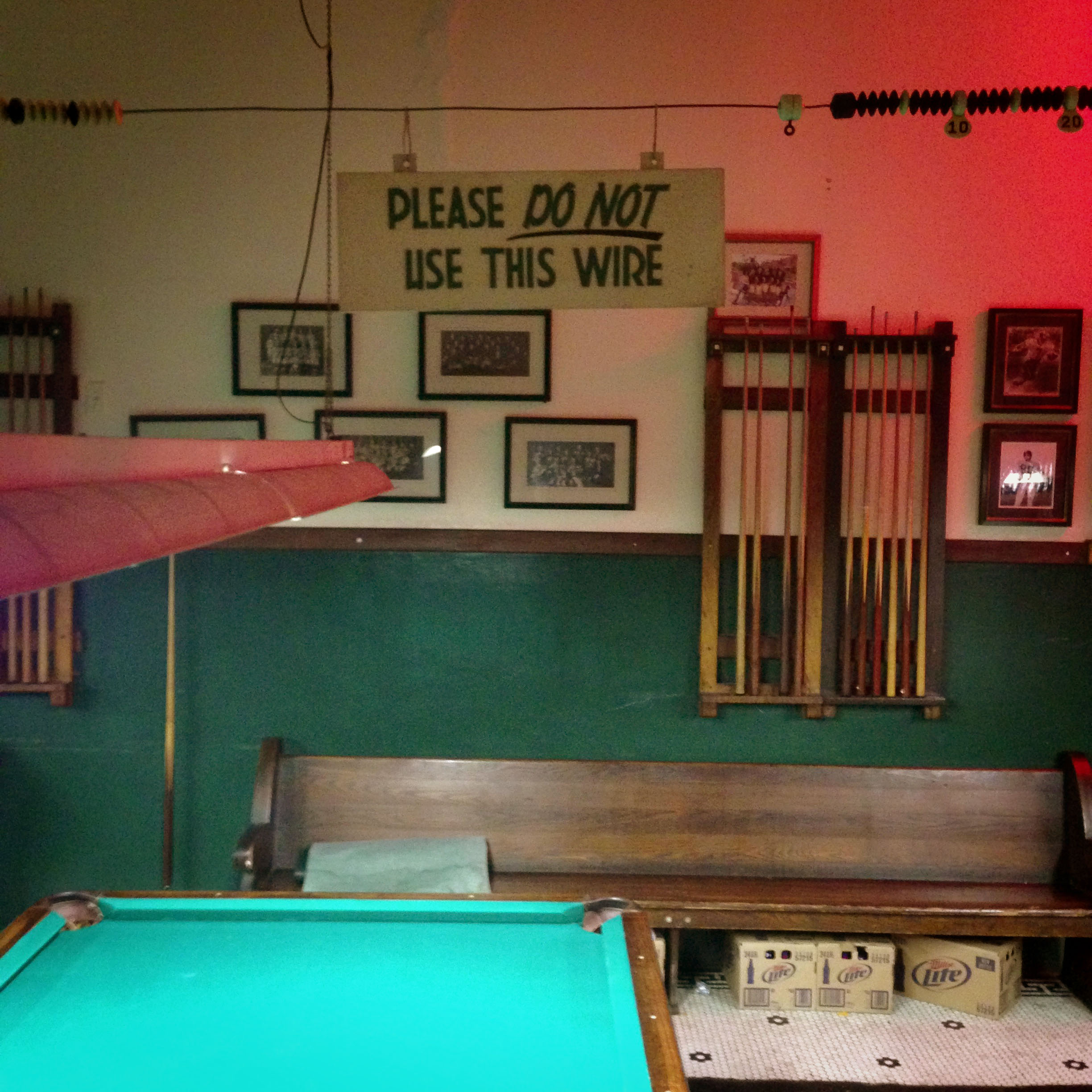
A scoring wire at Booches in Columbia, Missouri, with a sign stating "please do not use this wire"

Also scoring wire, score wire. Actual wire or string with multiple beads strung (like an abacus) used for keeping score. Beads may be numbered or, more commonly, are in series of nine small beads representing 1s punctuated by larger beads representing 10s. Scoring strings are usually strung over the table, above the lights, but may be mounted on the wall. Points "on the wire" are a type of handicap used, where a weaker player will be given a certain number of points before the start of the game.
2. The grapevine in the pool world, carrying news of what action is taking place where in the country.
wired
And wired combination/combo, wired kiss, etc. Same as dead (and variants listed there).
wood
A slang term for a cue, usually used with "piece", as in "that's a nice piece of wood". Contrast firewood.
wrap
Also wrapping, grip. A covering of leather, nylon string, Irish linen or other material around the area of the butt of a cue where the cue is normally gripped.

== Y ==
yellow ball

1. In snooker, the lowest-value colour ball, being worth two points. It is one of the baulk colours. In some (especially American) snooker ball sets, it is numbered "2" on its surface. It is placed on the yellow spot.
2. In blackball, one of two groups of seven object balls that must be potted before the eight ball; compare stripes; contrast red ball.
yellow spot
The spot (usually not specially marked because it is obvious) on a snooker table at which the yellow ball is placed. Regardless of table size, it is the intersection of the "D" and the baulk line on the breaker's right side. The left-to-right order of the green, brown and yellow balls is the subject of the mnemonic phrase "God bless you".
yellow pocket
In snooker, the corner pocket that is closest to the yellow spot.

== Z ==
zone
Also in the zone. Describes an extended period of functioning in dead stroke ("she's in the zone"). Sometimes capitalized for humorous effect.
