= Chapayev (game) =

Russian board game

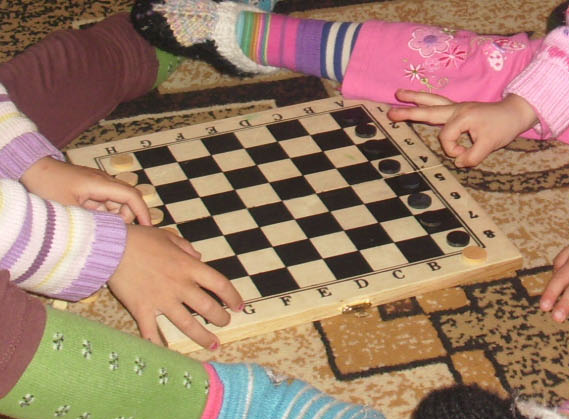
Children playing Chapayev

Chapayev (Russian: игра в Чапаева, romanized: igra v Chapayeva, 'game of Chapayev' or 'Chapayev's game') is a board game, a hybrid of checkers (draughts) and gamepiece-impact games like carrom, novuss, and pichenotte, giving it gameplay aspects in common with both billiards and table shuffleboard on a smaller scale, as well as some checkers strategy. It is played throughout the territory of the former USSR. The aim is to knock the opponent's pieces off the board. The game is named after the Russian Civil War hero, Vasily Chapayev.

== Equipment ==
The game requires a checkerboard and checkers, eight pieces of each colour. Pieces are of small size (smaller than the squares on the board, or the game may be too easy), and usually made of wood.

== Rules ==
The game is played in several rounds, with two players (or potentially with two teams of players alternating turns or shots during their turn). During the first round, white pieces are placed on the first row, and black on the last. White opens the game. (To neutralize the advantage, the pie rule can be used, allowing the black player to choose to switch places after the first move; this is similar to the push out in the pocket billiards game nine-ball.)

A player takes their turn by flicking one of his pieces with the index finger to shoot it at one or more of the opponent's pieces. If the move pushes one or more of the opponent's pieces off the board while all of the shooting player's own pieces remain, the player gets an extra move.

When a move fails to dislodge an opponent's piece, or the player dislodges one of the player's own pieces, the opponent's turn to move begins. The game continues until only one colour remains on the board, winning the round. Then the winner starts the next round, with that player's pieces one row further forward. When the seventh round starts, the black and white rows will be next to each other.

If a piece is flipped upside-down after an impact, it is called a traitor and the opponent gets control of it.

For the seventh and subsequent rounds, not only does a successful shooter move forward one row, but the loser is forced to move backwards. When one of the players reaches the final row, the opponent has no place left for their pieces and therefore loses the game.

== Variations ==
The rules of Chapayev differ from region to region. In some variations, an allowed move is to put the thumb and index finger on two pieces of one's own colour and quickly move them together towards centre, pushing an opponent's piece toward the middle off of the board – sometimes called a "scissors" move.

In another variant, the game is not finished when one player's remaining pieces have retreated to the back row and one of the opponent's pieces has reached that row: The next step is adding a second checker atop the piece of the advancing side (the figure is called a horse or tank; this is similar to being "crowned" in Western draughts/checkers). The game continues until one player's pieces are all eliminated.

== Computer versions ==
Several variants of Chapayev have been created as computer simulations. Implementations include Chapay (dating to 1999) at Pyva.net; Chapayev 3D (Чапаев 3D) from Narod.ru; Shuffle, Shuffle Challenge, and Shuffle Snakebites by WildSnake Software and Shockwave.com; the Battle Checkers and Chapayev iOS games at Apple's iTunes Store; and Chapayev for Android on the Google App Market (now Google Play; this game typically requires a checkers board and 8 to 16 Android devices).

== See also ==
- Carrom
- Crokinole
- Novuss
- Pichenotte
- Pitchnut
- Shove ha'penny
