= Pichenotte =

Tabletop, disk-flicking games

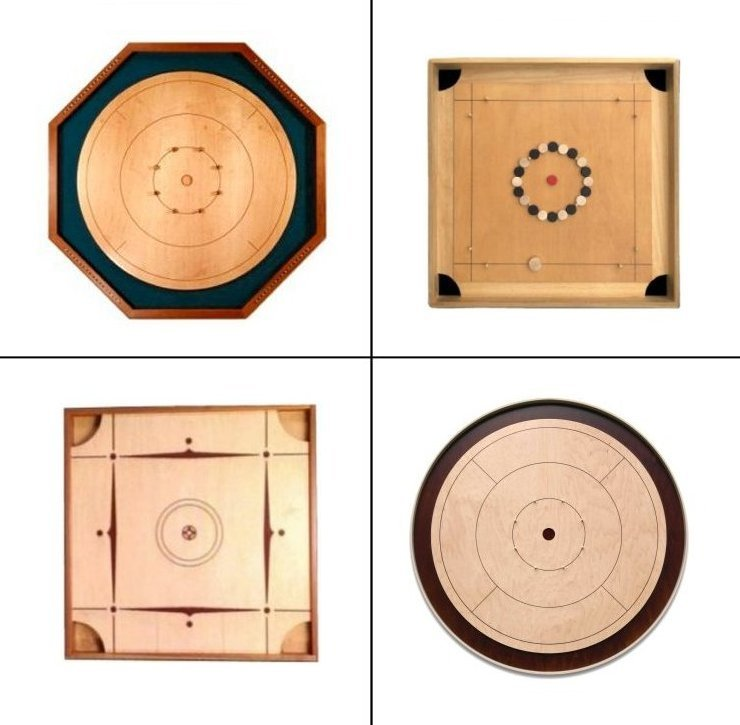
Family of pichenotte games

Pichenotte (French: [piʃnɔt] / PEESH-nut) refers to a family of several disk-flicking games, mostly French Canadian in origin, including crokinole, pitchnut, and North American carrom, which may sometimes be played with small cue sticks. Pichenotte is a Canadian French word meaning 'flick', which is derived from the European French word pichenette (French: [piʃnɛt]), also meaning 'flick'. These folk games are in the public domain, and are not subject to copyright like a commercial board game. Nor are they patented games (though a now-expired patent for one board variant was issued in 1880 in New York). However, the names Pichenotte and Pitchnut are registered trademarks in the United States. The game community site Knipsbrat.com states that, like the German name Knipsbrat ('flicking-board'), "pichenotte is another name for crokinole" The Canadian game board collection at the Quebec Museum of Civilization in Quebec City includes both the square carrom-type board and the round crokinole-type game Crokinole is also called pichenotte throughout much of North America. Modern-day tournaments have been held as far apart as Tavistock, Ontario, and Santa Fe and Albuquerque, New Mexico.

== Origins of disk-flicking games ==
In India and the surrounding areas of Southeast Asia, the game of carrom is generally considered to be the origin of the disk-flicking games that have evolved over time. Carrom has been played since ancient times and is currently played socially and professionally around the world at countless clubs and carrom tournaments.

The word carrom may be a shortening of and alteration of the French carambole and Spanish carambola, both referring to the red object ball in billiards, or by extension referring to carom billiards games as a class. The word ultimately originated in India; karambal is a name for the orange fruit, said to resemble a billiard ball, of the carambola tree.

Research has found early ties to the game in Portugal and Burma. While the specifics are uncertain, the different, yet similar games called pichenotte, crokinole and pitchnut may have originated around the mid 19th century, in Canada and the United States from the newly introduced Indian game of carrom via Southeast Asian immigrants or travelers returning home from Southeast Asian countries. The games are also considered cue sports when played using small cue sticks. Because of the many different types and shapes of the boards and playing pieces, there are often 'house rules' that govern play from region to region.

== Canadian–American carrom ==
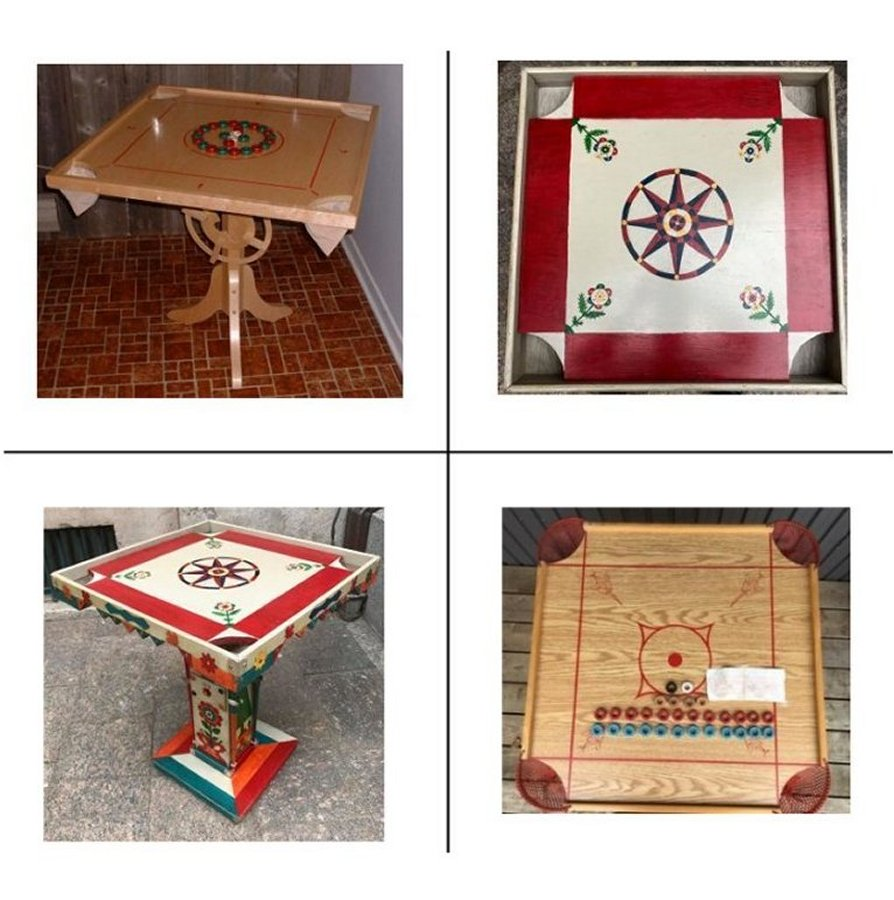
Canadian–American carrom or pichenotte boards

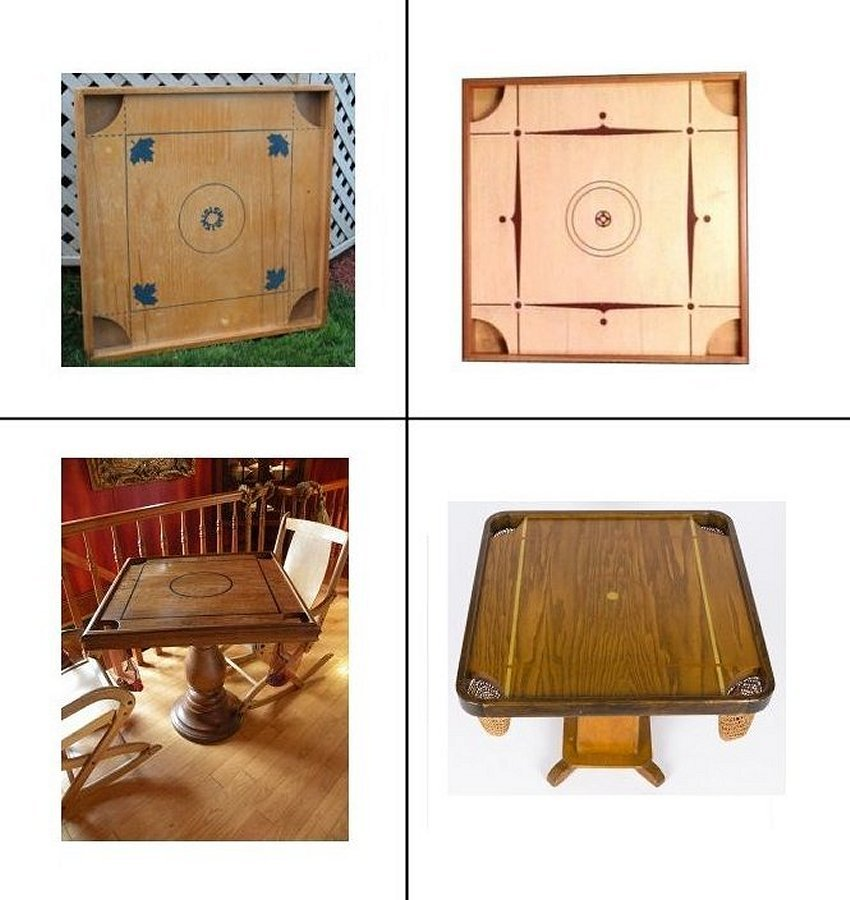
More Canadian–American carrom or pichenotte boards

This version (sometimes also called pichenotte), with a flat square playing surface and four corner pockets, is played in many parts of French Canada as well as the Northern United States. Many different sizes of boards and disks and varying rules exist. There are often "house rules".

=== Equipment ===
The game board is a square smooth flat wooden board often about 30 inches side to side with a raised wooden rail or bumper surrounding the game board. In each corner is an oblong hole, often about four inches long by three inches wide, and underneath each hole is a net to catch the pieces, much like the pockets on a pool table. Game pieces are round wooden disks about the size of checkers (draughts) pieces. Each player or team has nine disks. Three colors are typically used: white (9), black (9), and red (1 queen).

=== Game play ===
At the beginning of the game, the 19 disks are arranged in a circular pattern in the center of the board, with the red queen (final target piece) in the center. Each player uses a larger disk, called a striker, to flick at his or her own other disks and attempt to drive them into the corner pockets. The first player to pocket all of their pieces, and to then pocket the queen last, is the winner of that game.

== Pitchnut ==
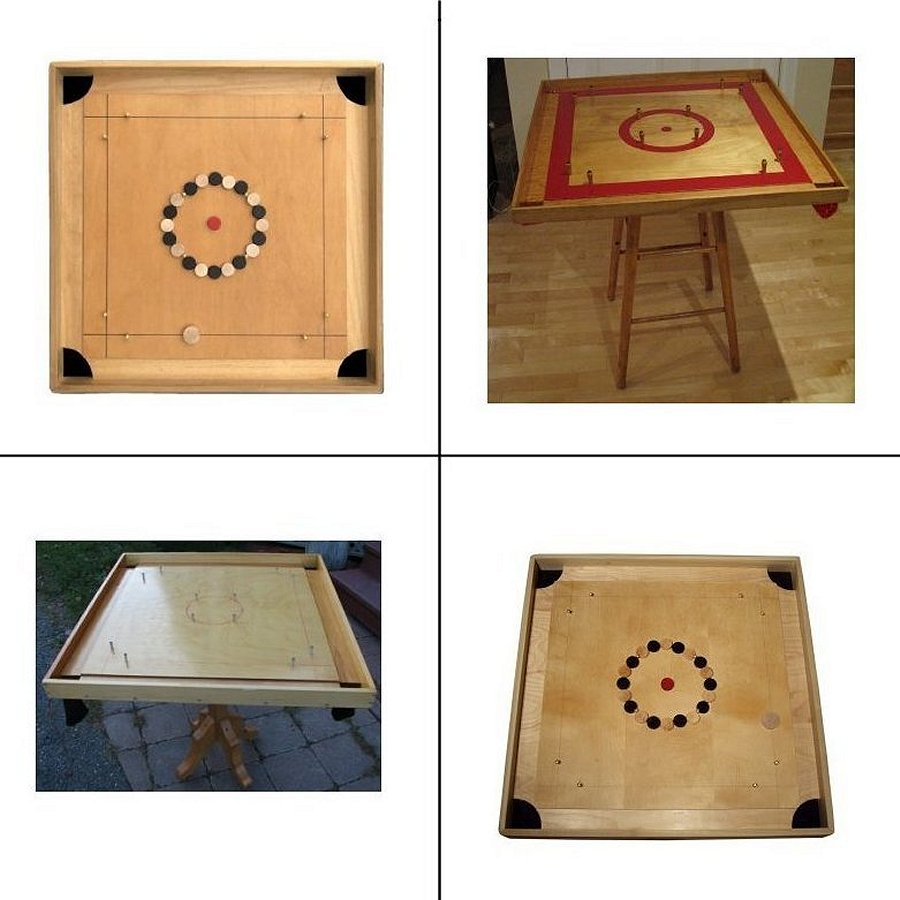
Canadian–American pitchnut boards

The name pitchnut is an anglicization of pichenotte, and this game is sometimes referred to as pichenotte.

Pitchnut may have evolved as a combination of two wooden games: carrom and crokinole, both of which are played by flicking wooden checker-like pieces. Although its precise origins remain a mystery, in St. Edwidge, Quebec, Canada, pitchnut or "pichenotte" boards are found in almost every household and most were built by Achille Scalabrini, a descendent from an Italian who settled there from Montreal. Pitchnut remains the rarest of the disc-flicking wooden games. Pitchnut is a registered trademark in the United States.

=== Equipment ===
A square board which is about 30 inches from side to side, and surrounded by a wooden rail. Four ovoid pockets about 3 inches across are in the corners with nets underneath. Four recessed alleys lie just within the rails. There are four pegs in the center circle area and two pegs in front of each pocket. Playing pieces, also called 'nuts' are wooden disks approximately 1 1/4-inch diameter and 3/8 inch tall with convex sides, made of maple wood. Typically, there are 10 black nuts, 10 white nuts and one red nut called the poison. The poison is similar to the queen in carrom and the jack or pallino in several lawn/court bowling games such as bocce. Each player has a shooter, a larger wooden disk, similar to a striker in carrom.

=== Game play ===
Goal: to sink all of one's pieces and the poison before the opponent does. May be played with two or four players. Play begins with alternating black and white pieces (nuts) in a ring, in the center of the board. Five pieces fit between each screw. The odd-colored poison is placed in the center of the board. The pieces must be struck with the shooter. The shooter is usually flicked with the index (or middle) finger and thumb in a flicking action (French: pichenotte). The shooter may be pushed with a finger without the use of the thumb, but may not be "carried" across the board. To win the game, a player must sink the poison after pocketing all of that player's pieces. If a player sinks the poison before the other pieces have all been pocketed, that is a loss of game, comparable to pocketing the black 8 ball early in most versions of eight-ball pool.

== Crokinole or pichenotte ==
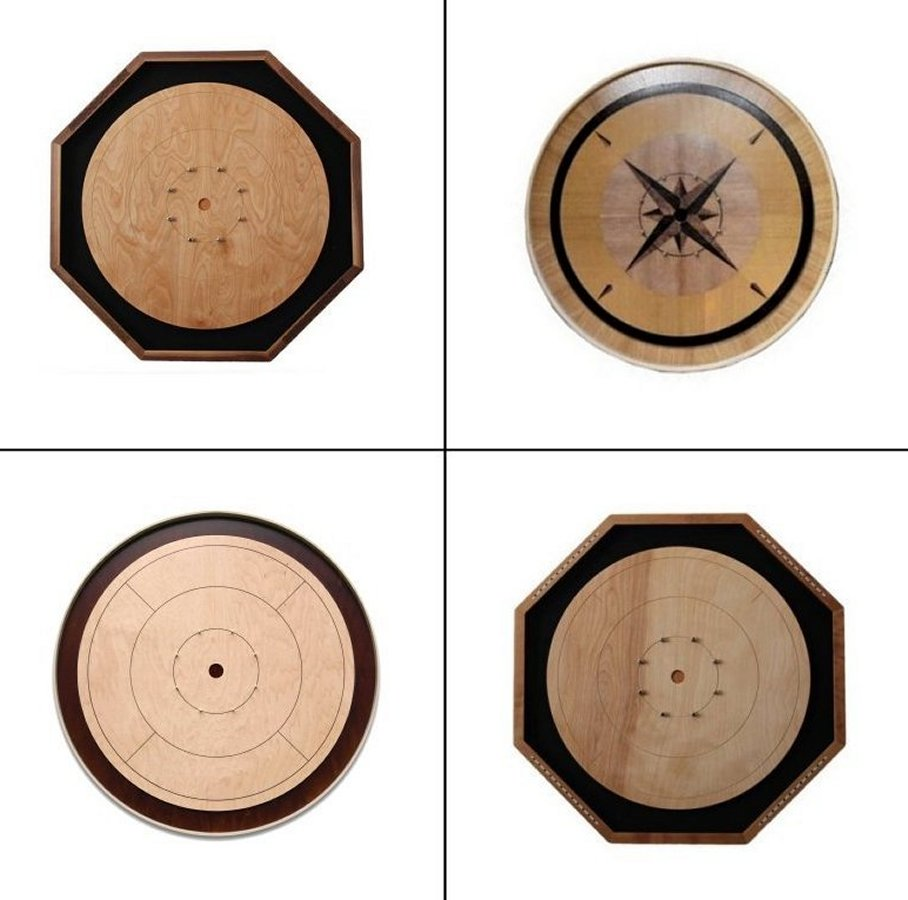
Canadian–American crokinole or pichenotte boards

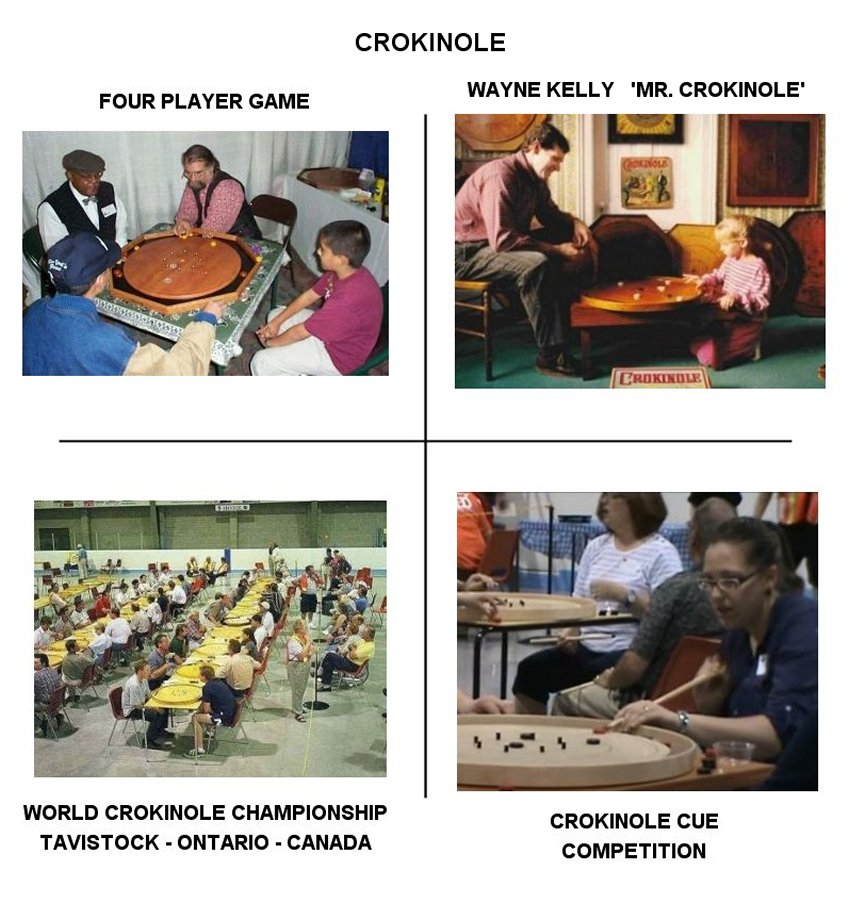
Canadian–American crokinole or pichenotte board

=== Origins and history ===
After 30 years of research, Canadian crokinole historian Wayne Kelly published his assessment of the first origins of crokinole, in The Crokinole Book,: "The earliest American crokinole board and reference to the game is M. B. Ross's patented New York board of 1880. The earliest Canadian reference is 1867, and the oldest surviving game board was dated at 1876 by Eckhardt Wettlaufer. As the trail is more than 100 years old and no other authoritative source can be found, it appears, at the moment, that Eckhardt Wettlaufer or M. B. Ross are as close as we can get to answering the question who [made the first board]." The name crokinole is generally acknowledged to derive from the Canadian French word croquignole, which (aside from also being a French name of this game) has several meanings: flick, fillip, and snap, but also biscuit and bun. Kelly wrote: "crokinole derives its name from the verb form [of croquignole] defining the principal action in the game, that of flicking or 'filliping' a playing piece across the board."

=== Equipment ===
The crokinole game board is a wooden game board consisting of a base, a round playing surface (the deck), the rails, and the recessed ditch area between the deck and the rails. The most critical part is the round playing surface. The official size at World Crokinole Championships in Tavistock, Ontario Canada, is 26 inch diameter. The round playing surface has concentric rings marked with thin lines to delineate the scoring point zones of 5, 10, 15 and 20 points for the center hole. The center is a recessed hole about 1 3/8 inches in diameter. There are four quadrants marked by small lines that give each player one quarter of the board as a shooting zone, from the outermost baseline running the circumference of the board. The round playing surface is raised significantly above the deck. The opponents' disks are shot into the recessed area that is called the ditch between the rails and the round deck. When the discs end up in the ditch, they are worth zero points. Surrounding the game board are rails that are often round or octagonal.

=== Game play and rules ===
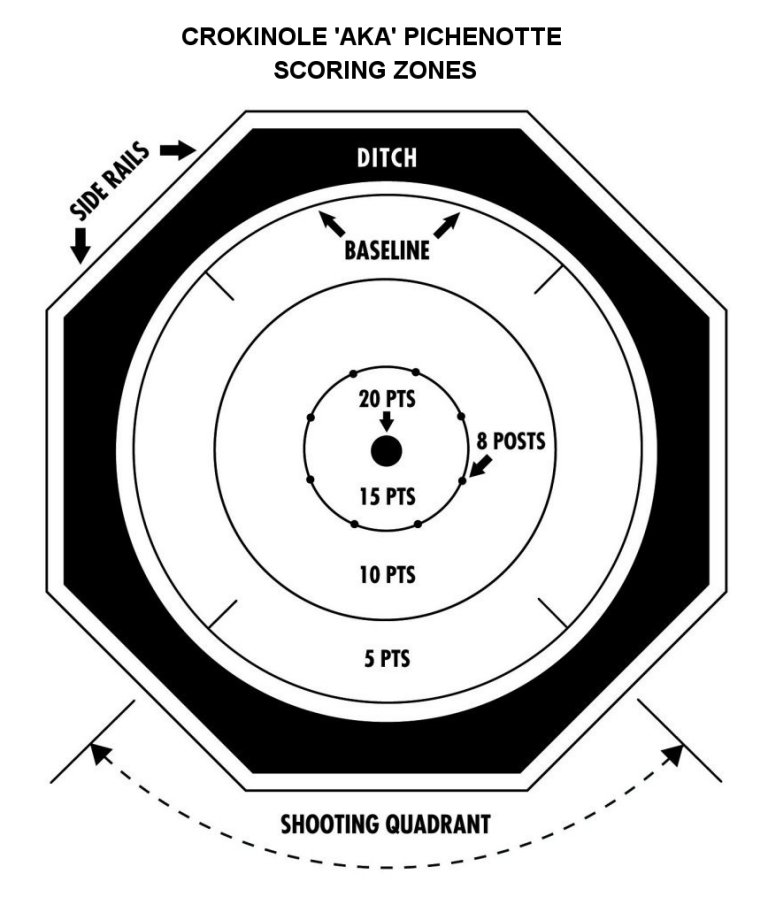
Crokinole or pichenotte scoring zones

The object of the game – which has similarities to aspects of shuffleboard, bocce, and curling – is to shoot one of one's own discs to attempt to knock an opponent disc into the ditch or into a lower scoring position, while progressing one's own discs into the higher-point zones and ultimately cause them to fall into in the center hole for 20 points. When a disc lands in the center hole, it is removed to a designated visible area like a clear plastic cup; these 20-points discs are tallied at the end of the game. There is no queen or striker as found in carrom and pitchnut. Each piece has scoring potential. The game may be played by 2, 3, or 4 players. Play starts with the game pieces off the board. Each player will have 12 discs of one color and shoot the discs one at a time, from within the quadrant, starting on the outermost baseline. Players choose who goes first then play alternates, one shot each in a clockwise direction, until everyone has shot all of their discs. Scoring is done at the end of the game. First, a player's 20s are added up, then points for whichever scoring zone the player's discs ended up in. The player / team with the higher score after a round shall receive two points. If the round is tied, each player / team shall receive one point. Zero points for a loss. A "game" shall consist of 4 rounds, other than where exceptions are made for Tournaments Championships. The number of games in a "match" is normally 10. However, this can vary in tournament play.

=== Clubs and tournaments ===
Perhaps the biggest crokinole tournament is the World Crokinole Championship in Tavistock, Ontario, on the first Saturday in June. This tournament attracts players from all over the world. There are many more tournaments and clubs all over Canada and the United States, and some have arisen in other areas, including the American Southwest.

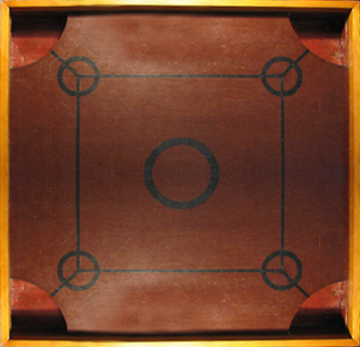
Canadian Pichenotte Board

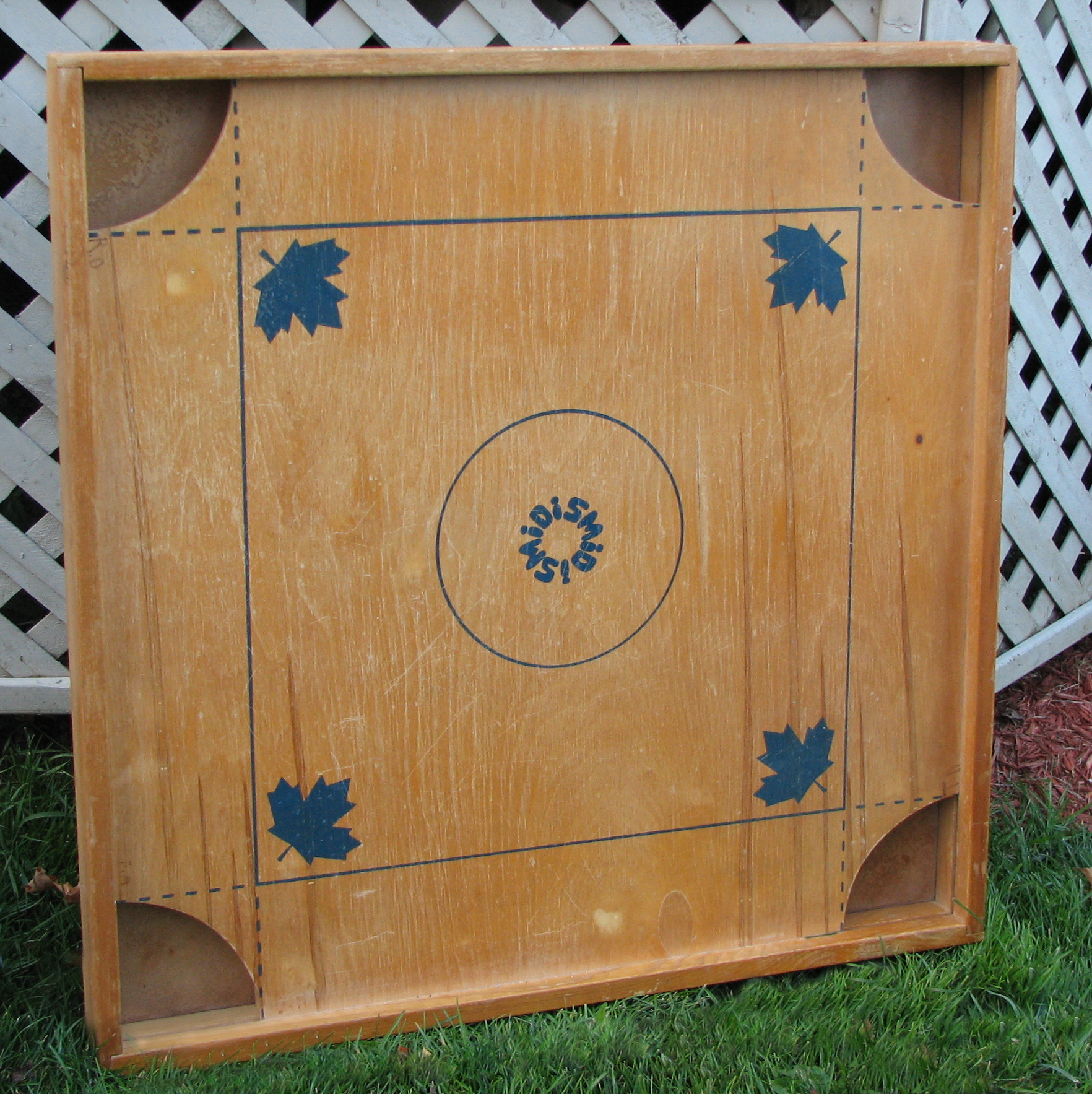
A pichenotte board from Sainte-Edwidge-de-Clifton, Quebec

== See also ==
- Carrom – an ancestral game from India
- Novuss – another development from carrom, with a larger board and played standing, with cues
