= Crokinole =

Table-top disk-flicking game

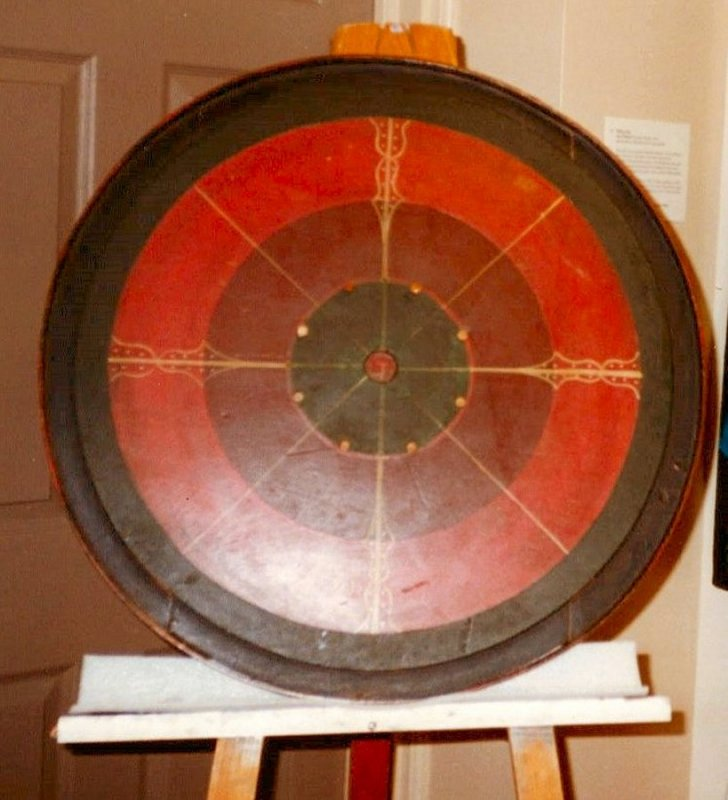
- Crokinole Game Board
- Manufacturers: Mostly cottage industry manufacturers in Canada and USA
- Designers: Eckhardt Wettlaufer - Ontario, Canada
- Years active: Made since mid 1800s in Canada and USA and now gaining in popularity in many parts of the world
- Players: 2 or 4
- Age range: 5 years old and up
- Skills: Fine motor skill, eye–hand coordination, intuitive understanding of physics & plane geometry

Crokinole (/ˈkroʊkɪnoʊl/ KROH-ki-nohl) is a disk-flicking dexterity board game, possibly of Canadian origin. It is similar to the games of pitchnut, carrom, and pichenotte, with elements of shuffleboard and curling reduced to table-top size. Players take turns shooting discs across the circular playing surface, trying to land their discs in the higher-scoring regions of the board, particularly the recessed centre hole of 20 points, while also attempting to knock opposing discs off the board, and into the 'ditch'. In crokinole, the shooting is generally towards the centre of the board, unlike carroms and pitchnut, where the shooting is towards the four outer corner pockets, as in pool. Crokinole can also be played using cue sticks, and there is a special category for cue stick participants at the World Crokinole Championships in Tavistock, Ontario, Canada.

== Equipment ==
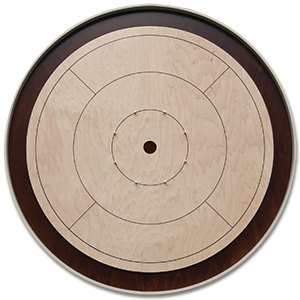
A round tournament style crokinole board. Boards may also be octagonal, which is the more traditional shape.

Board dimensions vary with a playing surface typically of polished wood or laminate approximately 26 inches (660 mm) in diameter. The arrangement is 3 concentric rings worth 5, 10, and 15 points as you move in from the outside. There is a shallow 20-point hole at the centre. The inner 15-point ring is guarded with 8 small bumpers or posts. The outer ring of the board is divided into four quadrants. The outer edge of the board is raised slightly to keep errant shots from flying out, with a gutter between the playing surface and the edge to collect discarded pieces. Crokinole boards are typically octagonal or round in shape. The wooden discs are roughly checker-sized, slightly smaller in diameter than the board's central hole, and typically have one side slightly concave and one side slightly convex, mainly due to the inherent features of wood, more than a planned design. Alternatively, the game may be played with ring-shaped pieces with a central hole. The discs were sometimes also called biscuits in the past in southwestern Ontario.

=== Powder ===
The use of any lubricating powder in crokinole is controversial, with some purists reviling the practice.

Powder is sometimes used to ensure pieces slide smoothly on the surface. Boric acid was popular for a long time, but is now considered toxic and has been replaced with safer substitutes. The EU has classified Boric acid as a "Serious Health Hazard". In the UK, many players use a version of anti-set-off spray powder, from the printing industry, which has specific electrostatic properties, with particles of 50-micrometre diameter (1.97×10^{−5} in). The powder is made of pure food-grade plant/vegetable starch.

The World Crokinole Championships in Tavistock, Ontario, Canada, states: "The WCC waxes boards, as required, with paste wax. On tournament day powdered shuffleboard wax (CAPO fast speed, yellow and white container) is placed in the ditch. Only tournament organizers will apply quality granular shuffleboard wax. Wax will be placed in the ditch area so that players can rub their discs in the wax prior to shooting, if they desire. Contestants are not allowed to apply lubricants of any type to the board. Absolutely no other lubricant will be allowed".

== Gameplay ==
Crokinole is most commonly played by two players, or by four players in teams of two, with partners sitting across the board from each other. Players take turns flicking their discs from the outer edge of their quadrant of the board onto the playfield. Shooting is usually done by flicking the disc with a finger, though sometimes small cue sticks may be used. If there are any enemy discs on the board, a player must make contact, directly or indirectly, with an enemy disc during the shot. If unsuccessful, the shot disc is "fouled" and removed from the board, along with any of the player's other discs that were moved during the shot.

The international association of crokinole (founded in 2009) has laid out rules for tournaments and competition play, but being a grass roots game, there are equally valid variations which can make game play more or less interesting depending on time and context.

=== International Association of Crokinole Rules ===
When there are no enemy discs on the board, many (but not all, see Muskoka Variation) rules also state that a player must shoot for the centre of the board, and a shot disc must finish either completely inside the 15-point guarded ring line, or (depending on the specifics of the rules) be inside or touching this line. This is often called the "no hiding" rule, since it prevents players from placing their first shots where their opponent must traverse completely through the guarded centre ring to hit them and avoid fouling. When playing without this rule, a player may generally make any shot desired, and as long as a disc remains completely inside the outer line of the playfield, it remains on the board. During any shot, any disc that falls completely into the recessed central "20" hole (a.k.a. the "Toad" or "Dukie") is removed from play, and counts as twenty points for the owner of the disc at the end of the round, assuming the shot is valid.

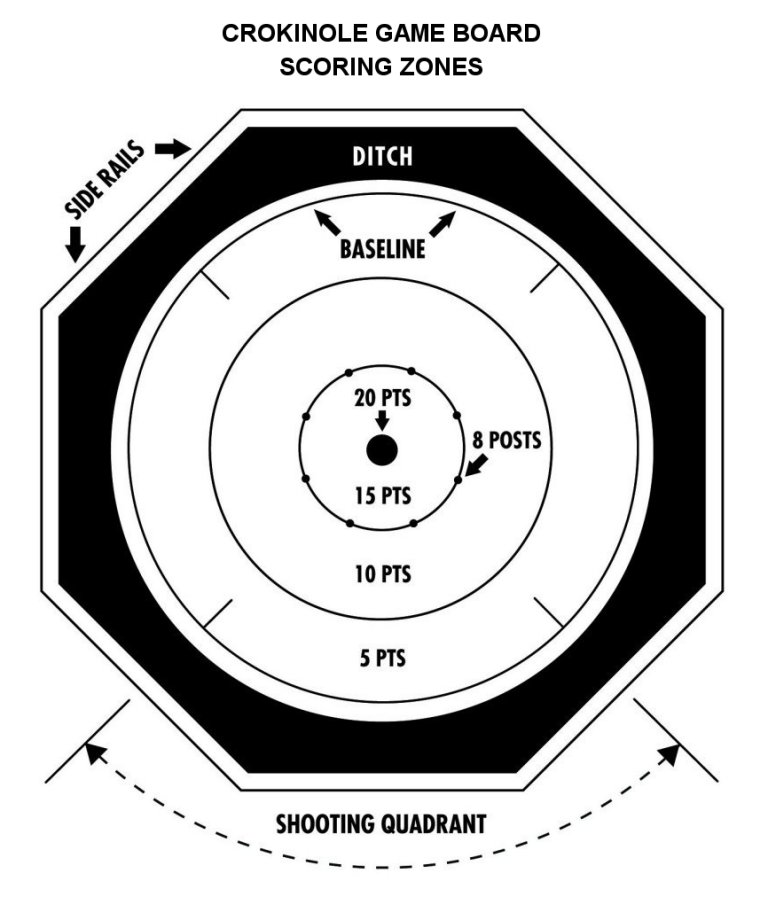
Crokinole game board scoring zones

Muskoka Variation

The Muskoka Variation was played in and around the region and the rules slightly vary:

1. A disc may be shot anywhere on the board regardless of being within the 15-point guarded ring line. This does allow for hidden discs and difficult shots
2. This rule is coupled with the rule that you are not obligated to connect with an enemy disc and a disc played remains in play until it is knocked out of play
3. If a disc goes into the recessed hole, there is one opportunity for the subsequent opposing player to knock the opponent's disc out of the recessed hole (this is requires an extreme and risky flick, but can be done.)

=== Adding up the scores ===
Scoring occurs after all pieces (generally 12 per player or team) have been played, and is differential: i.e., the player or team with higher score is awarded the difference between the higher and lower scores for the round, thus only one team or player each round gains points. Play continues until a predetermined winning score is reached.

== History of the game ==
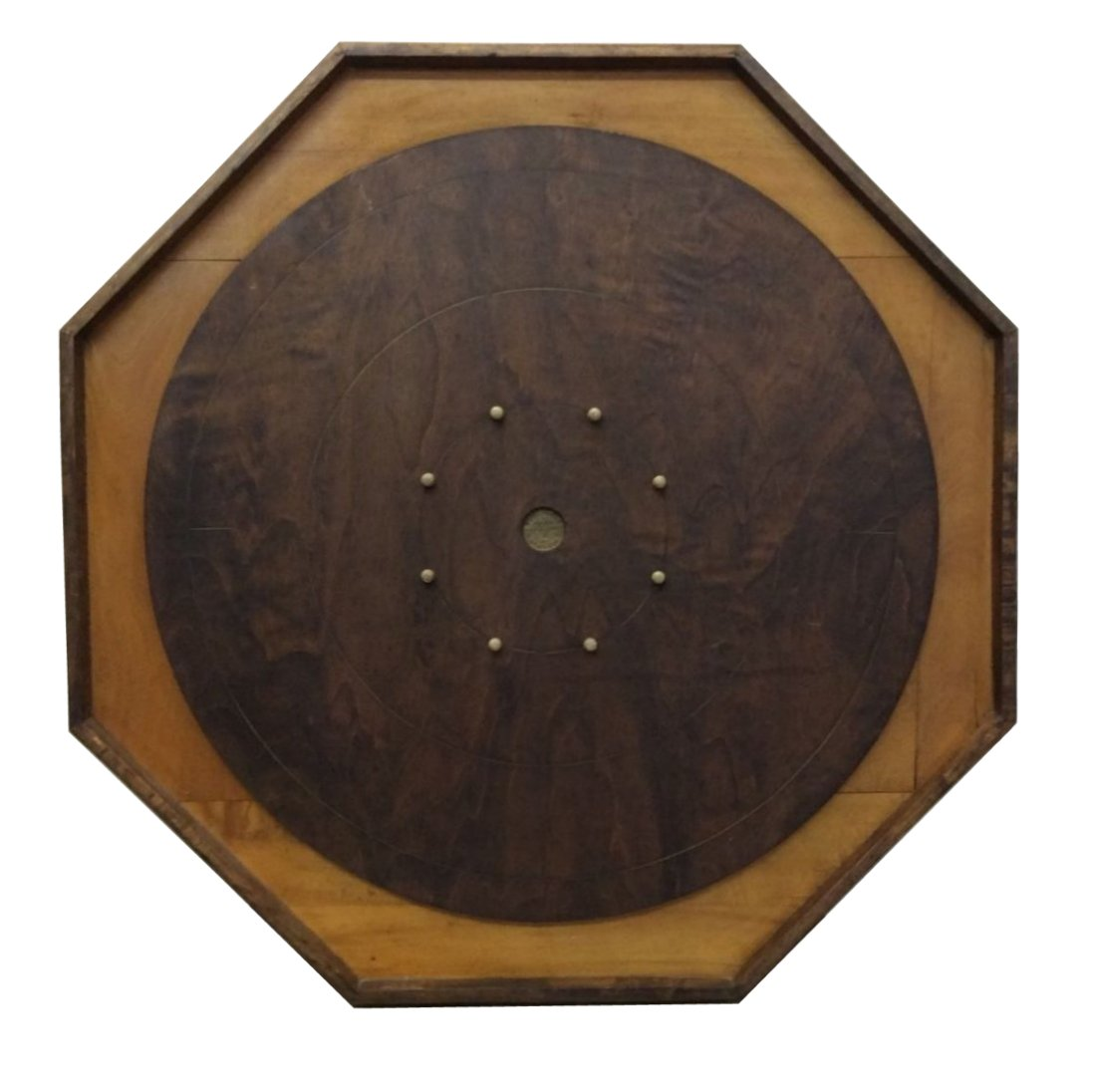
Crokinole board by M.B. Ross, patented 1880

After 30 years of research, Wayne Kelly published his assessment of the first origins of crokinole, in The Crokinole Book, Third Edition, page 28, which leaves the door open to future research and discovery of the origins of the game of crokinole: "The earliest American crokinole board and reference to the game is M. B. Ross's patented New York board of 1880. The earliest Canadian reference is 1867 (Sports and Games in Canadian Life: 1700 to the Present by Howell and Howell, Toronto, MacMillan Company of Canada, 1969, p.61), and the oldest piece dated at 1875 by Ekhardt Wettlaufer.

The earliest known crokinole board was made by craftsman Eckhardt Wettlaufer in 1876 in Perth County, Ontario, Canada. It is said Wettlaufer crafted the board as a fifth birthday present for his son Adam, which is now part of the collection at the Joseph Schneider Haus, a national historic site in Kitchener, Ontario, with a focus on Germanic folk art. Several other home-made boards dating from southwestern Ontario in the 1870s have been discovered since the 1990s. A board game similar to crokinole was patented on 20 April 1880 by Joshua K. Ingalls (US Patent No. 226,615).

Crokinole is often believed to be of Mennonite or Amish origins, but there is no factual data to support such a claim. The reason for this misconception may be due to its popularity in Mennonite and Amish groups. The game was viewed as a rather innocuous pastime – unlike the perception that diversions such as card playing or dancing were considered "works of the Devil" as held by many 19th-century Protestant groups. The oldest roots of crokinole, from the 1860s, suggest the British and South Asian games, such as carrom, are the most likely antecedents of what became crokinole.

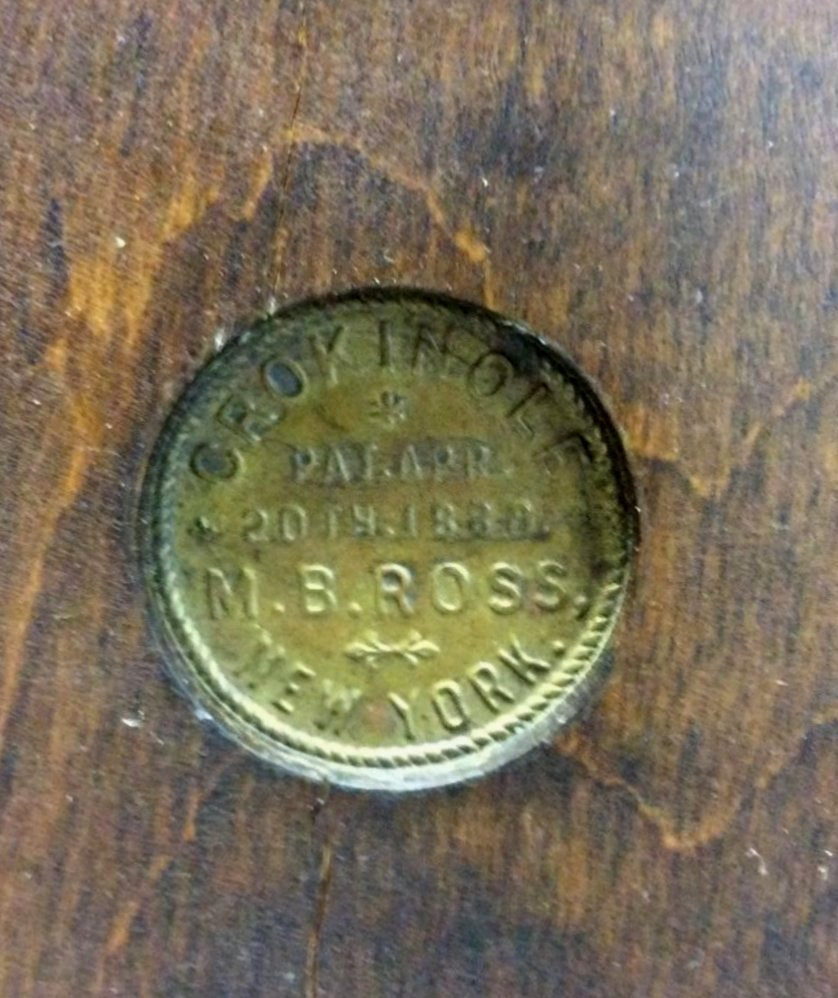
Crokinole board by M.B. Ross, patented 1880

In 2006, a documentary film called Crokinole was released. The world premiere occurred at the Princess Cinema in Waterloo, Ontario, in early 2006. The movie follows some of the competitors of the 2004 World Crokinole Championship as they prepare for the event.

== Origins of the name ==
The name "crokinole" derives from croquignole, a French word today designating:

1. in France, a kind of cookie (or biscuit in British English), similar to a biscotto;
2. in French Canada, a pastry somewhat similar to a doughnut (except for the shape).

It also used to designate the action of flicking with the finger (Molière, Le malade imaginaire; or Voltaire, Lettre à Frédéric II Roi de Prusse; etc.), and this seems the most likely origin of the name of the game. Croquignole was also a synonym of pichenotte, a word that gave its name to the different but related games of pichenotte and pitchnut.

From The Crokinole Book 3rd Edition by Wayne S. Kelly "Is it possible that the English word 'crokinole' is simply an etymological offspring of the French word 'croquignole'? It would appear so for the following reasons. Going back to the entry for Crokinole in Webster's Third New International Dictionary, within the etymological brackets, it says: [French croquignole, fillip]. This is a major clue. The word fillip, according to Webster's, has two definitions: "1. a blow or gesture made by the sudden forcible release of a finger curled up against the thumb; a short sharp blow. 2. to strike by holding the nail of a finger curled up against the ball of the thumb and then suddenly releasing it from that position". So it seems evident, then, that our game of crokinole derives its name from the verb form (of croquignole) defining the principal action in the game, that of flicking or 'filliping' a playing piece across the board".

The word Crokinole is generally acknowledged to have been derived from the French Canadian word "Croquignole", a word with several meanings, such as fillip, snap, biscuit, bun and a woman's wavy hairstyle popular at the turn of the century. The US state of New York shares border crossings with both of the Canadian provinces of Ontario and Quebec, all three of which are popular "hotbeds" of Crokinole playing.

Crokinole is called knipsbrat ('flick-board') (and occasionally knipsdesh (flick-table)) in the Plautdietsch spoken by Russian Mennonites.

== World Crokinole Championship ==
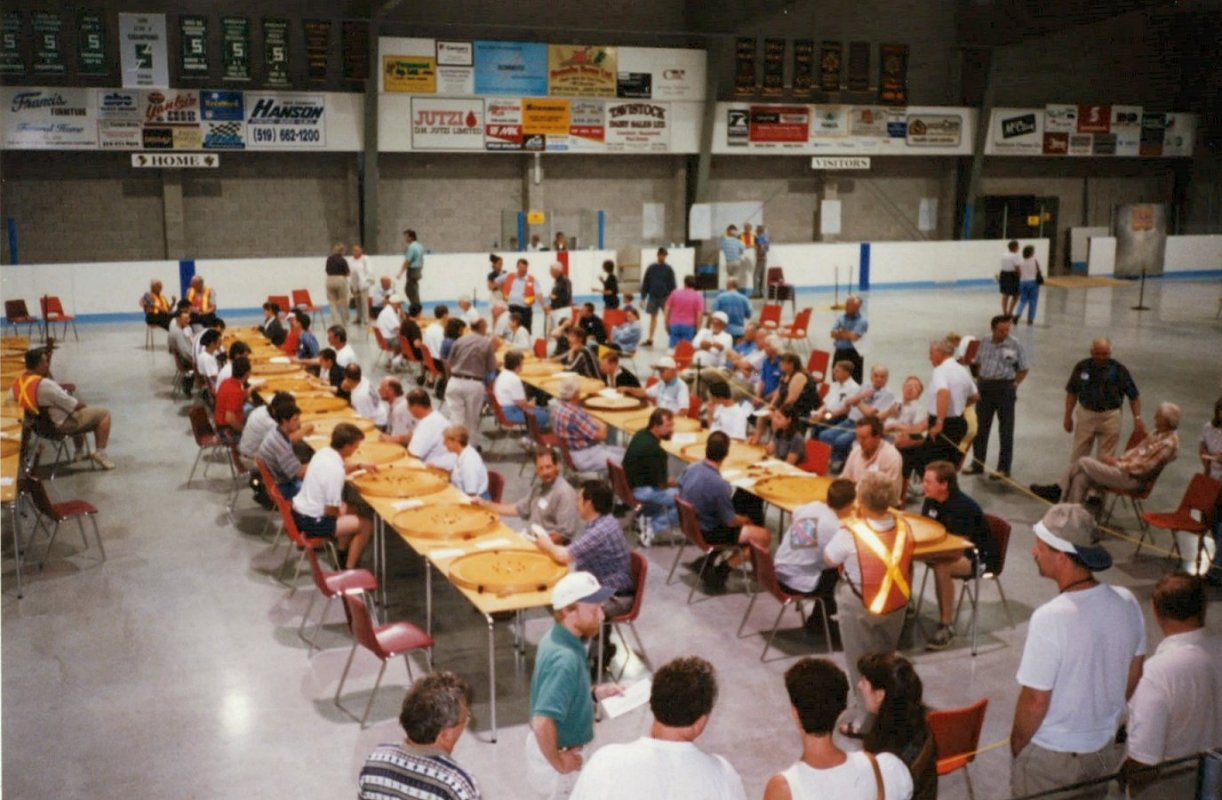
World Crokinole Championship 1999, in Tavistock, Ontario, Canada

The World Crokinole Championship (WCC) tournament has been held annually since 1999 on the first Saturday of June in Tavistock, Ontario. Tavistock was chosen as the host city because it was the home of Eckhardt Wettlaufer, the maker of the earliest known board. The tournament has seen registration from every Canadian province, several American states, Germany, Australia, Spain, the UK, and Japan.

The WCC singles competition begins with a qualifying round in which competitors play 10 matches against randomly assigned opponents. The qualifying round is played in a large randomly determined competition. At the end of the opening round, the top 16 competitors move on to the playoffs. The top four in the playoffs advance to a final round robin to play each other, and the top two compete in the finals. The WCC doubles competition begins with a qualifying round of 8 matches against randomly assigned opponents with the top six teams advancing to a playoff round robin to determine the champions.

The WCC has multiple divisions, including a singles finger-shooting category for competitive players (adult singles), novices (recreational), and younger players (intermediate, 11–14 yrs; junior, 6–10 yrs), as well as a division for cue-shooters (cues singles). The WCC also awards a prize for the top 20-hole shooter in the qualifying round of competitive singles, recreational singles, cues singles, intermediate singles, and in the junior singles. The tournament also holds doubles divisions for competitive fingers-shooting (competitive doubles), novices (recreational doubles), younger players (youth doubles, 6–16yrs), and cues-shooting (cues doubles).

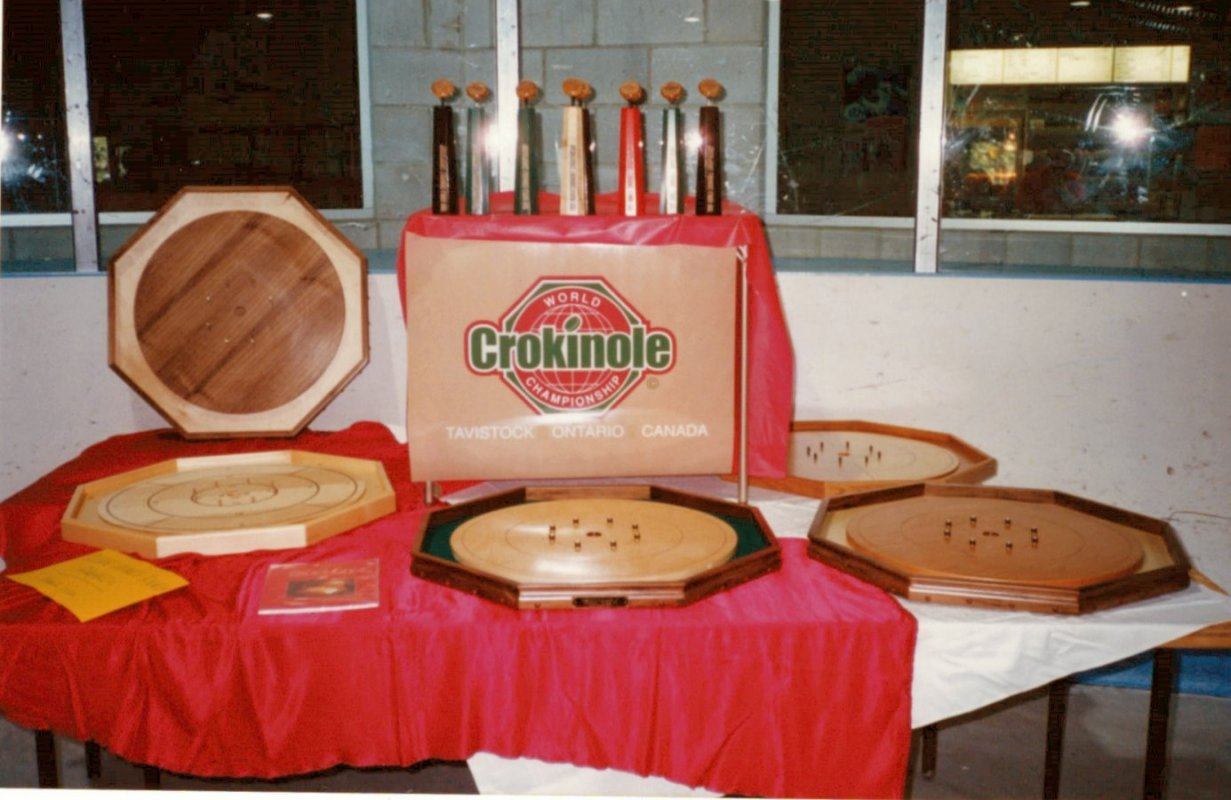
World Crokinole Championship 1999

The official board builder of the World Crokinole Championships is Jeremy Tracey.

== National Crokinole Association ==
The National Crokinole Association (NCA) is an association that supports existing, and the development of new, crokinole clubs and tournaments. While the majority of NCA events are based in Ontario, Canada, the NCA has held sanctioned events in the Canadian provinces of PEI and BC, as well as in New York State.

The collection of NCA tournaments is referred to as the NCA Tour. Each NCA Tour season begins at the Tavistock World Crokinole Championships in June, and concludes at the Ontario Singles Crokinole Championship in May of the following years. The results of each tournament award points for each player, as they compete for their season-ending ranking classification.

== See also ==
- Chapayev
- Darts
- Novuss
- Table shuffleboard
