= Carrom =

Indian tabletop game

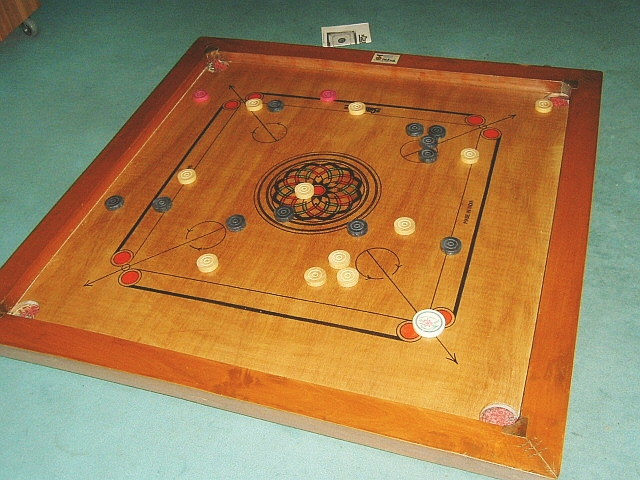
- Genres: Board game
- Players: 2–4

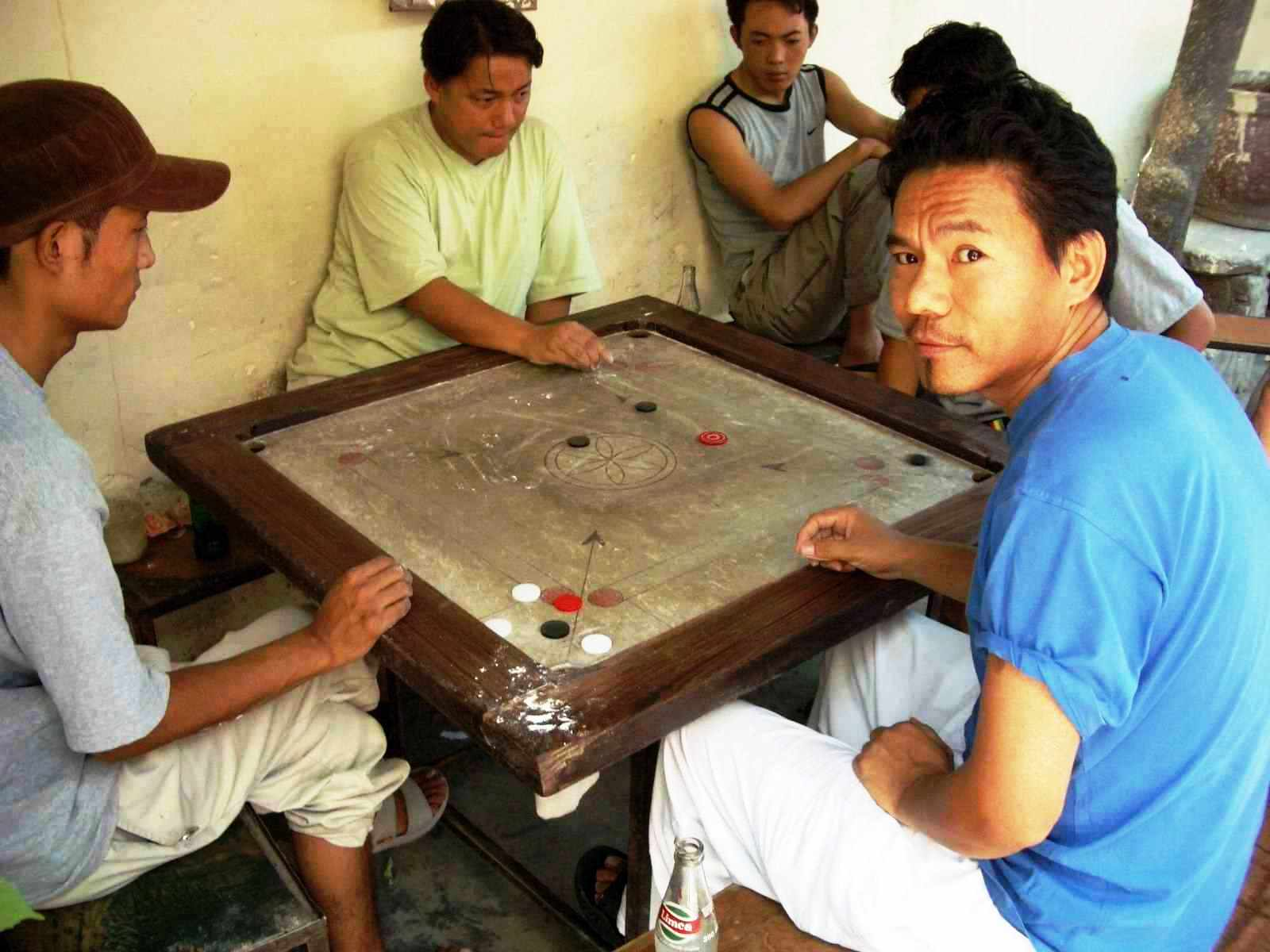
Tibetans playing carrom in Delhi

Carrom is a tabletop game of Indian origin in which players flip or flick discs, attempting to knock them to the corners of the board, in a similar fashion to billiards. Throughout South Asia, many clubs and cafés hold regular carrom tournaments. Carrom is commonly played by families, including children, and at social gatherings. Different standards and rules exist in different areas.

== Etymology ==
The word carrom probably comes from carom, which means 'to strike and rebound'.

== History ==
The game of carrom originated in India. One carrom board with its surface made of glass is still present in one of the palaces in Patiala, India. State-level competitions were being held in the different states of India during the early part of the 20th century. Serious carrom tournaments may have begun in Sri Lanka in 1935; by 1958, both India and Sri Lanka had formed official federations of carrom clubs, sponsoring tournaments and awarding prizes.

The International Carrom Federation (ICF) was formed in the year 1988 in Chennai, India. The formal rules for the Indian version of the game were published in 1988. In the same year the ICF officially codified the rules. The UKCF was formed in 1991 in London. The main work of this organisation is to promote the game of Carrom throughout the UK and ensure the participation of UK players in all major international championships.The UKCF have hosted 3 Euro cups in England and have had fantastic success in the tournament with UK players. UKCF organised national championships and league tournaments throughout the UK on an annual basis.

The United States Carrom Association reports on competitions in the US and Canada and has a player ranking list as of the last tournament.

A group of Carrom enthusiasts grouped together in 2004 and established the Pakistani Carrom Federation or PCF. The PCF have worked to build clubs across Pakistan to promote and teach the game.

The German Carrom Federation was founded in 1986 with the objective of supporting and maintaining the game of Carrom. The federation oversees Germany Carrom Clubs and teams throughout Germany.

The Italian Carrom Federation was founded in 1995 by a group of Carrom enthusiasts and is responsible for the spread of the game throughout Italy. The federation is supported by a large number of volunteers who regularly run events throughout Italy to teach and educate about the game.

The Japan Carrom Federation was established in 1997. In 2001 they moved into their new headquarters in Tokyo from Hikone. Originally set up to allow players to compete in overseas tournament but held their first national championship in 2004 and now hold tournaments, demonstrations and training camps across Japan.

The board and pieces can be bought in Europe, North America, or Australia and are usually imported from India. The most expensive boards are made to a high standard with high quality wood and decorations though cheaper boards are available. Some of the largest exporters of carrom boards are in India, e.g. Precise, Surco, Syndicate Sports and Paul Traders.

== Equipment ==
The game is usually played on a square board made of plywood, with a pocket in each corner. The International Carrom Federation says that the square playing surface must be between exactly 73.5 and 74 centimetres (28.9 and 29.1 in) along each side, that the edges be bounded by bumpers of wood, and the underside of each pocket be covered by a net capable of holding at least 10 carrom pieces.

=== Carrom men ===
Carrom men and one striker, arranged at the start of a game

Carrom is played using small disks of wood or plastic known as carrom men (sometimes abbreviated CM, c.m. c/m, etc.). These pieces, aside from the special queen, may also be known as seeds, coins, pawns (as in chess), or pucks. Carrom men are designed to slide when struck and are made with a smooth surface that slides easily when laid flat on the board. They are struck by a Striker of a standard specification which is larger and heavier. Carrom follows similar "strike and pocket" games, like pool, with its use of rebounds, angles, and obstruction of opponent's carrom pieces.

A carrom set contains 19 pieces (striker not included) in three distinct colours: 9 white carrom men, 9 black carrom men and 1 red queen.

ICF-approved pieces must have a diameter of no more than 3.18 cm and no less than 3.02 cm. The pieces must be between 7 and 9 mm thick. The pieces have a plain, rounded edge. The mass of the pieces must be between 5.0 and 5.5 g.

=== Strikers ===
Striker pieces are used to hit the carrom men and the queen across the board to the pockets, similar to how the cue ball is used in billiards. The carrom striker normally weighs 15 grams of size 4.1 cm diameter.

=== Queen ===
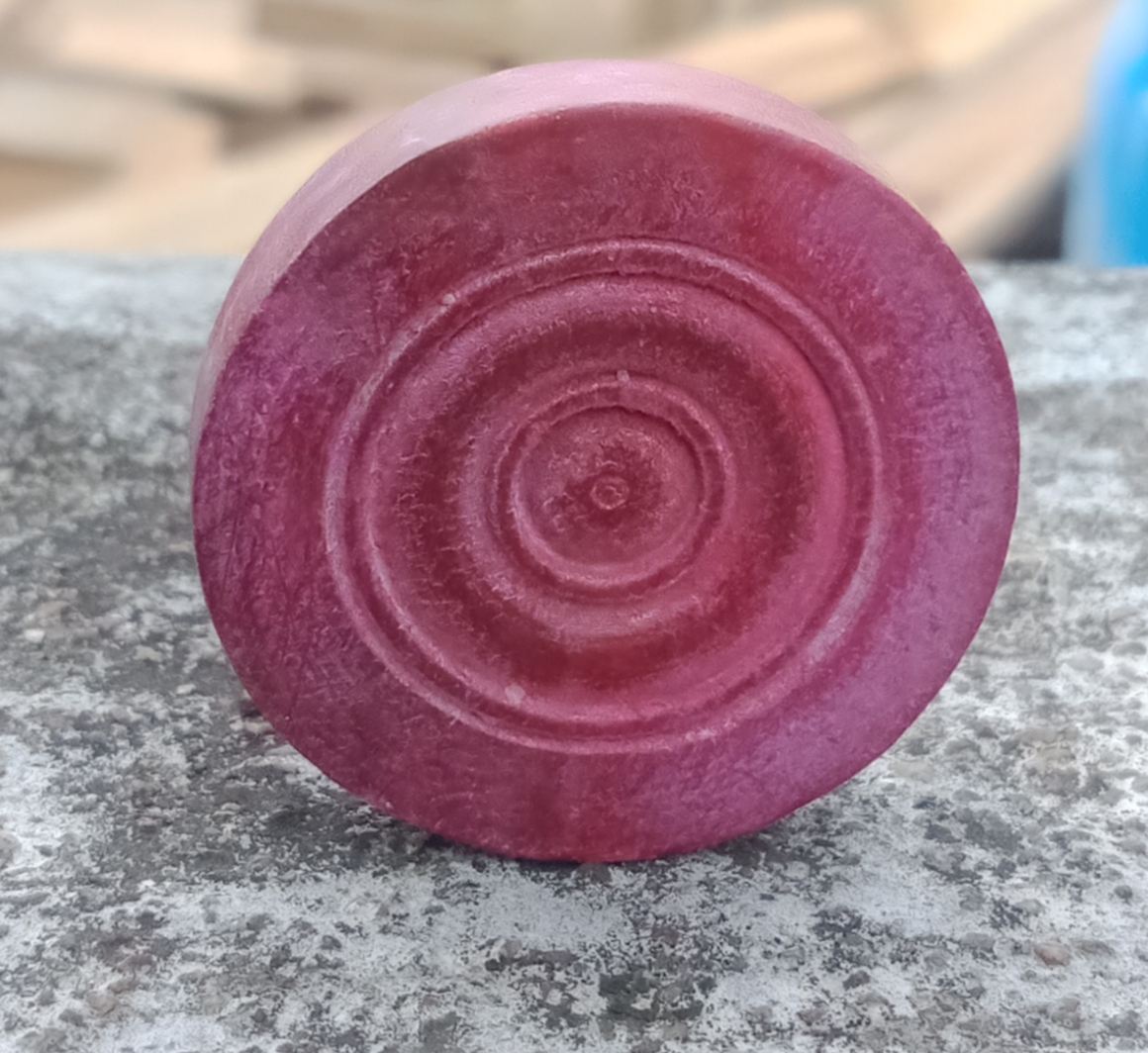
The queen

The red disk is called the queen; it is the most valuable piece. During board setup, it is placed at the centre of the circle. In accordance with the ICF rules, pocketing the queen adds 3 points to the player's total score. The dimensions of the queen must be the same as those of other carrom men.

- The player must pocket the queen and subsequently pocket a carrom man of the player's own colour. This is termed covering the queen. If by mistake, a player puts a carrom man of the opposite team in the pocket after pocketing the queen, then the queen has to be placed in the centre of the board again.
- If the player fails to pocket a subsequent carrom man, the queen is replaced at the centre of the board.
- If the player pockets their opponent's last carrom man before pocketing the queen, then it's a foul.
- If a player puts the queen and a carrom man of the player's own colour in the pocket with one use of the striker, the queen is automatically covered, but it does not matter which went first.

=== Powder ===
Fine-grained powder is used on the board to enable the pieces to slide more easily. Boric acid powder is the most commonly used for this purpose.

In the UK, many players use a version of anti-set-off spray powder from the printing industry which has specific electrostatic properties with particles of 50 micrometres in diameter. The powder is made from pure, food-grade vegetable starch.

== Standardised rules and regulations ==
The ICF promulgates International Rules of Carrom (also termed "The Laws of Carrom"). ICF acts as the governing body of carrom. The organisation also ranks players, sanctions tournaments and presents awards. ICF has many national affiliates such as the All-India Carrom Federation, Australian Carrom Federation, and United States Carrom Association.

=== Toss ===
Order of play is determined by the process of "calling the carrom men" or "the toss". Before commencing each match, an umpire hides one black carrom man in one hand and one white carrom man on the other hand. The players guess which colour carrom men is being held in each hand. The player who guesses correctly wins the toss.

The winner of the toss strikes first, which is called the opening break. The winner of the toss has the option to change sides from white to black and give up the opening break. The winner of the toss may not pass this decision to the other player. If the winner of the toss chooses to change sides then the loser must strike first.

The player taking the first shot (or break) plays white carrom men. The opponent plays black. If that player cannot score any points then they lose the turn and their opponent can choose to play any carrom man, Black or White in favour.

=== Shooting ===
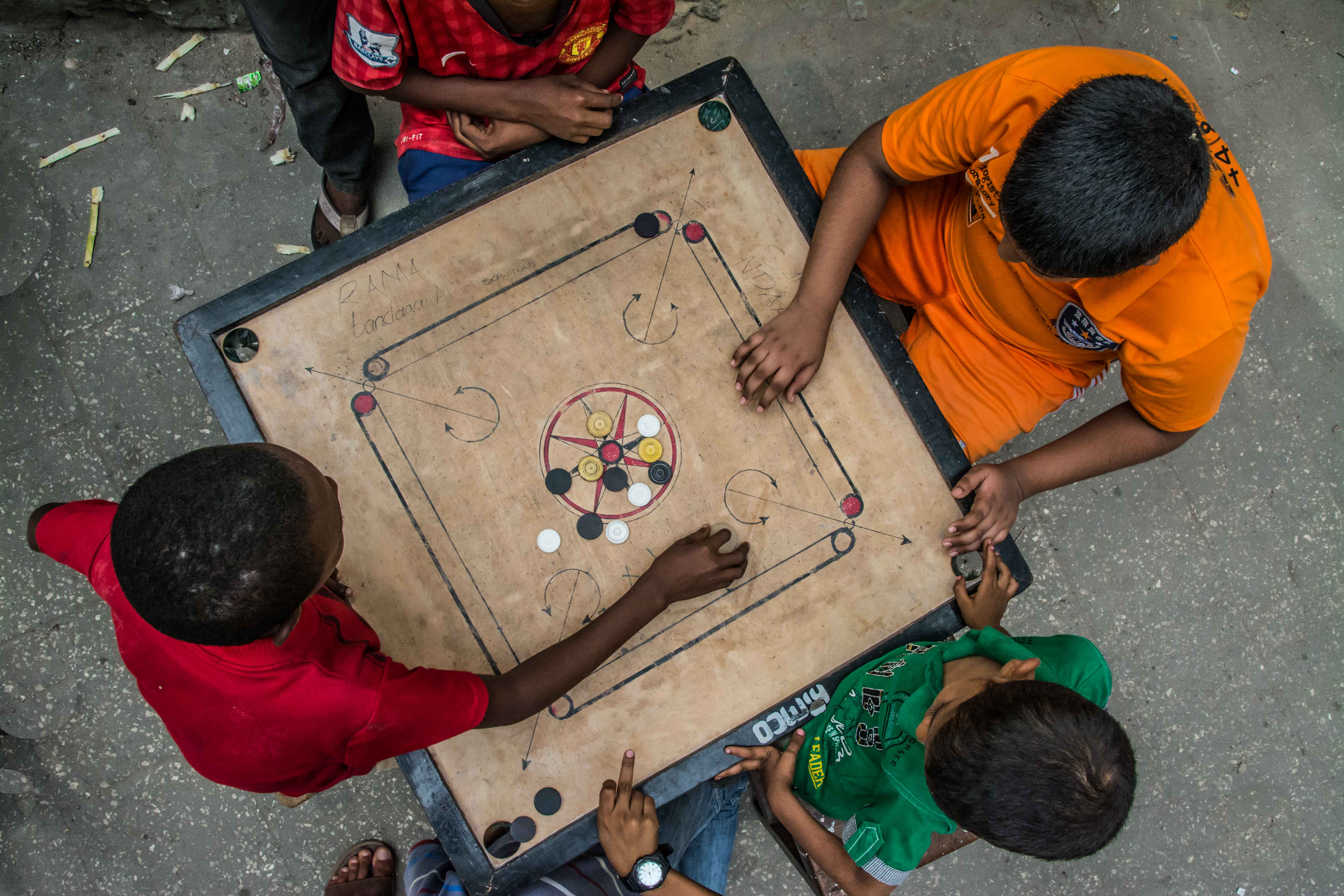
Carrom being played in Tanzania

A successful pot entitles the player to shoot again. This means that, as in pool and snooker, it is possible for a player to pot all their pieces and cover the queen from the start of the game without the opponent being given the chance to shoot.

Any player pocketing the queen is required to cover it immediately by pocketing one of their carrom men on the entitlement shot. If after potting the queen the player fails to cover it, then the queen is returned to the centre of the table. It is illegal to pot the Queen after the last piece since the queen must always be covered.

Thumbing is allowed by International Carrom Federation which allows the player to shoot with any finger including the thumb (known as "thumbing", "thumbshot", or "thumb hit").

Crossing the diagonal lines on the board by coming in touch with it, pocketing the striker is a foul. A player needs to ensure that their striking hand does not infringe/cross the diagonal lines aerially/physically. A player committing a foul must return one carrom man that was already pocketed.

If a player pockets their striker, they have to pay a penalty. This penalty is usually 10 points.

== Variations ==
=== Professional ===
- Each team or player is assigned a colour and can only pocket that colour of carrom men.
- Pocketing the queen must be followed by pocketing another coin on the consecutive strike.
- The queen can only be pocketed if the player has already pocketed a carrom man but has not yet pocketed the last carrom man of the player's colour as a carrom man must be pocketed to cover it.
- Once the queen is covered, whoever clears all their carrom men first wins the board.
- Game automatically ends after last coin is pocketed, even is striker is still in play or goes out after.
- Queen and cover can not be pocketed in the same strike, irrespective of the order they enter the pocket.
- The winner of a board collects one point for each of the opponent's carrom men left at the finish and three points for the queen if covered by the winner (if covered by the loser, no-one gets those points). No more points are collected for the queen after your score reaches 21.
- A game consists of 25 points.
- When placing the striker on the board to shoot, it must touch both baselines, either covering the end circle completely or not touching it at all. The striker may not touch the diagonal arrow line.
- Shooting styles can vary between players, but all shots must involve flicking the striker and not pushing it. While players may orient their bodies for aiming, they must remain seated for the shot.
- Carrom men can be struck directly only if they are not touching the player's baseline or situated behind the baseline. According to the new rule, if the carrom man is behind the baseline, the player can directly hit the carrom man by the carrom striker unlike before we have to strike the carrom men off any side of the carrom board or any other carrom piece on the board but not directly.
- Sinking the striker incurs a penalty of one piece and a loss of turn. If a piece is pocketed in the same shot as the striker that piece is also removed. These pieces are returned to the board in the center circle. If the striker is sunk before any of a player's carrom men, that player must later return a carrom man after sinking to make up for the deficit.
- If while the queen and a carrom man are sunk on the same shot, the queen is not considered covered regardless of the order that the pieces entered the pocket.
- If a piece jumps off the board, it is placed on the center spot. If pieces land on end or are overlapping, they are left that way.
- If the center spot is partially covered when replacing the queen or a jumped piece, the piece should cover as much red as possible. If totally covered, the piece is placed opposite the next player behind the red spot.
- One can touch any coin. However, if the player touches their last piece directly before the queen, penalty will be imposed.
- If a player sinks an opponent's piece, that player loses a turn. If a player sinks an opponent's last carrom piece they lose the board and three points are deducted from their score.
- If a player sinks their last piece before the queen, they lose the board, three points and one point for each of their opponent's pieces left.
- If the striker does not leave both lines, the player has another chance. After three tries without leaving the lines the player loses their turn.
- These rules are mostly played in the UK, Sri Lanka, and India.

=== Point ===
Point carrom is a variant that is popular with children or an odd number of players. Each player is allowed to pocket carrom men of any colour.

- Carrom men of either colour are assigned 1 point each.
- The queen gives 3 points.
- The black gives 1 points.
- The white gives 1 points.
- To get queen points, one needs to put a carrom man of any colour in the same pocket after the queen on the same or a subsequent strike in the same turn. If the player fails to "cover" the queen in this fashion, the queen is put back in the center of the board.
- The first player to reach 25 points is declared the winner.
- If no player reaches 25 points, the player with the highest points is declared the winner. If the scores are tied, a tie-breaker must be played. Players who are tied select a colour and are only allowed to pocket carrom men of the other colour on the rebound.

=== Family-point ===
Family-point carrom (also known as simple-point carrom) is an informal variant suitable for an odd number of players. Each player is allowed to pocket carrom men of any colour.

- Typically, a black carrom man scores 10 points, and a white scores 20 points
- The queen scores 50 points.
- As in point carrom, the queen must be "covered" pocketing another carrom man in the same pocket on the same or subsequent strike in one's turn.
- With the points system, if one team/player gets queen points early in the game, the opponent still has a good chance to win by earning more points.
- This style of play is widely accepted in many areas of South-East Asia.

=== Total-point ===
- The black carrom men are worth 1, 5, or 10 point(s) and the white ones are worth 2, 10, or 20 points (depending on exact game variant).
- The queen is assigned 5 or 50 points. As in the above two variants, it must have a carrom man pocketed after it.
- To win, a player must receive all the carrom men on the board.
- After the first round, the player or team with the lowest score puts all their carrom men in the center.
- The others must match this score in the center and the players play for the carrom men in the center.
- They repeat this until one team or player has all the carrom men.
- This style of play is widely accepted in many areas of Bangladesh, India and Pakistan.

== Board variations ==
Carrom boards are available in various board sizes and corner-pocket sizes. There are smaller boards and boards with larger pockets. Boards with larger pockets are used by beginners for easier gameplay. On traditional carrom boards, the corner pockets are only slightly larger than the carrom men, but smaller than the striker. On boards with larger pockets, it is possible to pocket the striker, resulting in a "scratch shot" as in pool. This results in a "due". On a due, the player has to return one previously pocketed carrom man to the board. The standardised association and federation size is a 74 × 74 cm (29 × 29 inch) square playing surface with 5–10 cm (2–4 in) borders. Other play-area sizes are not used in tournaments and competitions.

=== North American carrom ===
North American carrom, played primarily in Canada and the northern United States, is a variant developed around 1890 by Christian missionaries to Asia, who brought the game back with them. Concerned with young boys loitering around pool halls (where gambling was common), an American Sunday school teacher named Henry L. Haskell altered the game for Western tastes. Much of the game is the same, but the striker's weight is reduced and the carrom men are smaller. Generally, instead of disks, carrom men (including the striker) are rings, originally of wood but today commercially made of plastic. In addition, as an alternative to using the fingers to flick the striker, some of the American carrom boards use miniature cue sticks. American carrom boards also have pockets built into the corners, rather than circular holes in the board, to make pocketing easier. While traditionally made boards vary widely, current commercially produced American carrom boards, by the Carrom Company of Michigan, are squares measuring 28 inches (71 cm) to a side, are printed with checkerboard and backgammon patterns, among others, and are sold with dice, skittles, etc. to allow other games to be played on the same board. These boards may also be printed on the reverse with the circular pattern for playing crokinole.

=== Japanese carrom ===
Carrom was introduced to Japan in the early 20th century. Carrom became popular as tōkyūban (闘球盤, Japanese for 'pounding board', 'fight ball board' or 'throw ball board'), but fell in popularity in the Shōwa period. However, carrom became known as "Hikone Karomu" (Hikone carrom) in Hikone, Shiga. The Hikone carrom board has larger pockets (not unlike those of pichenotte), the discs are arranged in a ring (also like in Pichette), each player is given twelve discs instead of nine, and the queen (known as the "jack") is pocketed last (similar to Eight-ball or Black ball).

=== South African fingerboard ===
It is similar to Carrom played in South Asia, but coins are used rather than rocks.

=== Mexican fichapool ===
Since 2008 there is a Mexican variation called fichapool or colloquially, fichapúl (from Spanish ficha). The men (12 each side) as the strikers, are plastic rings. As the South African fingerboard, it has larger pockets.

== Commercial derivations ==
Several companies made copies of Haskell's carrom game board. The Transogram Company made a version in the 1950s and called it Skooker. Coleco made reproductions in the 1980s with names like "Carom-playing Games Board" with up to 202 derived replication games. Some variants in the 1970s were called "101 Games Board" and "Carom-playing 166 Games Board". An ice-box manufacturer made "Combinola" and "Crokinola" variants.

== Cultural depictions ==
Films depicting Carrom include the 2003 Hindi film Munna Bhai M.B.B.S, the 2010 Hindi film Striker and the 2018 Tamil film Vada Chennai.

== Similar games ==
Games similar to carrom include pichenotte, pitchnut, crokinole, Chapayev, novuss and button football.

== Vintage boards ==
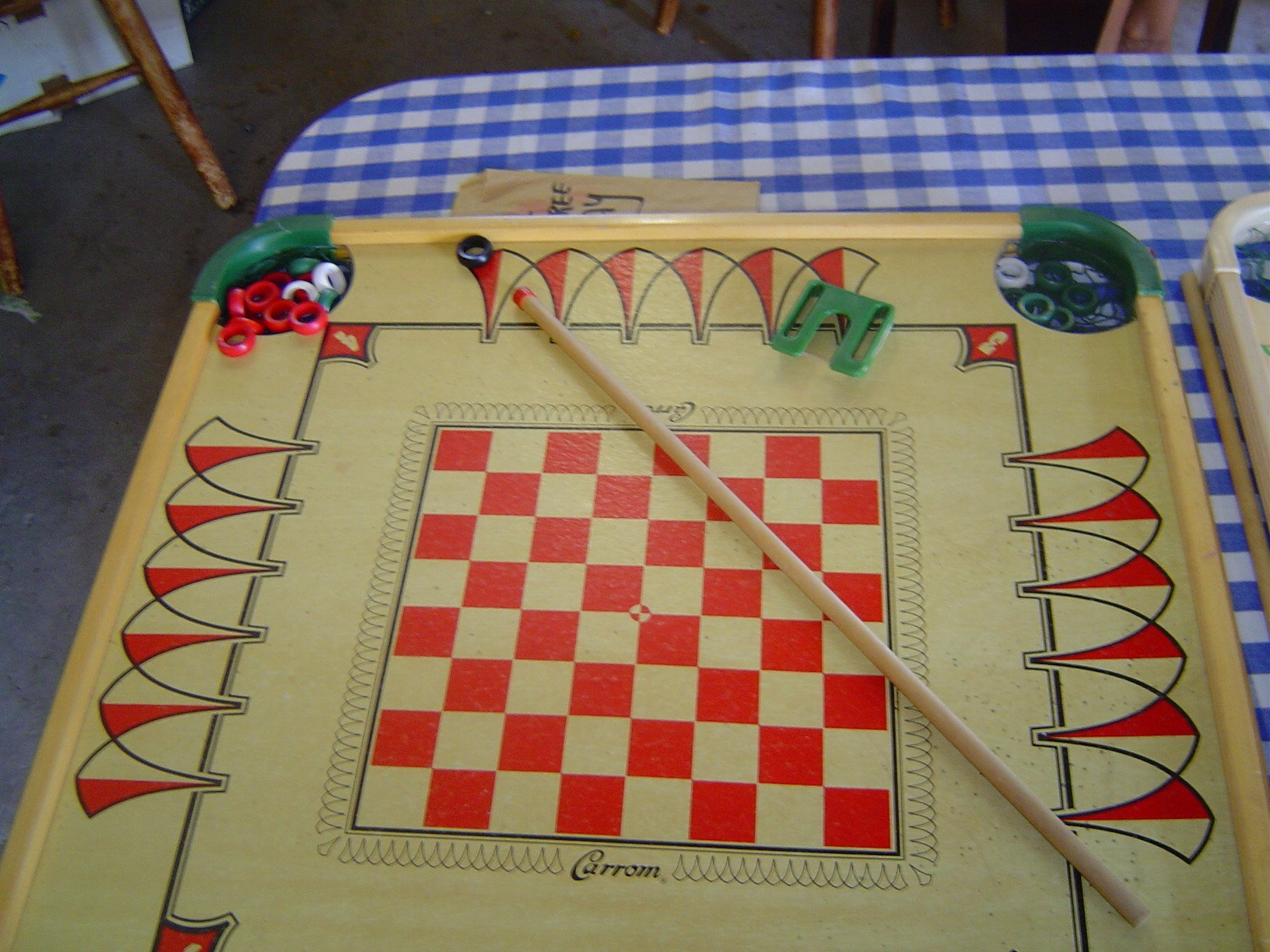

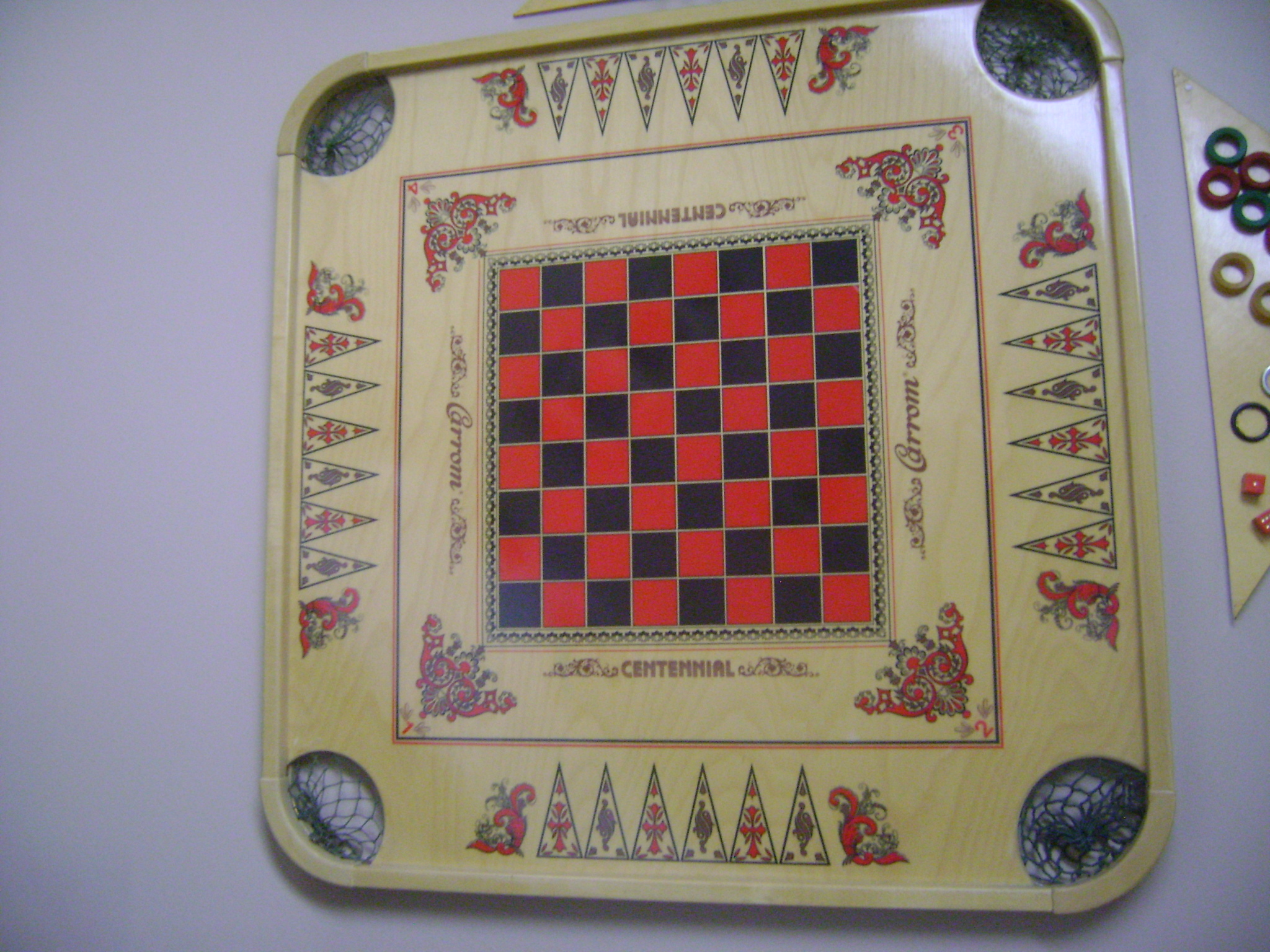

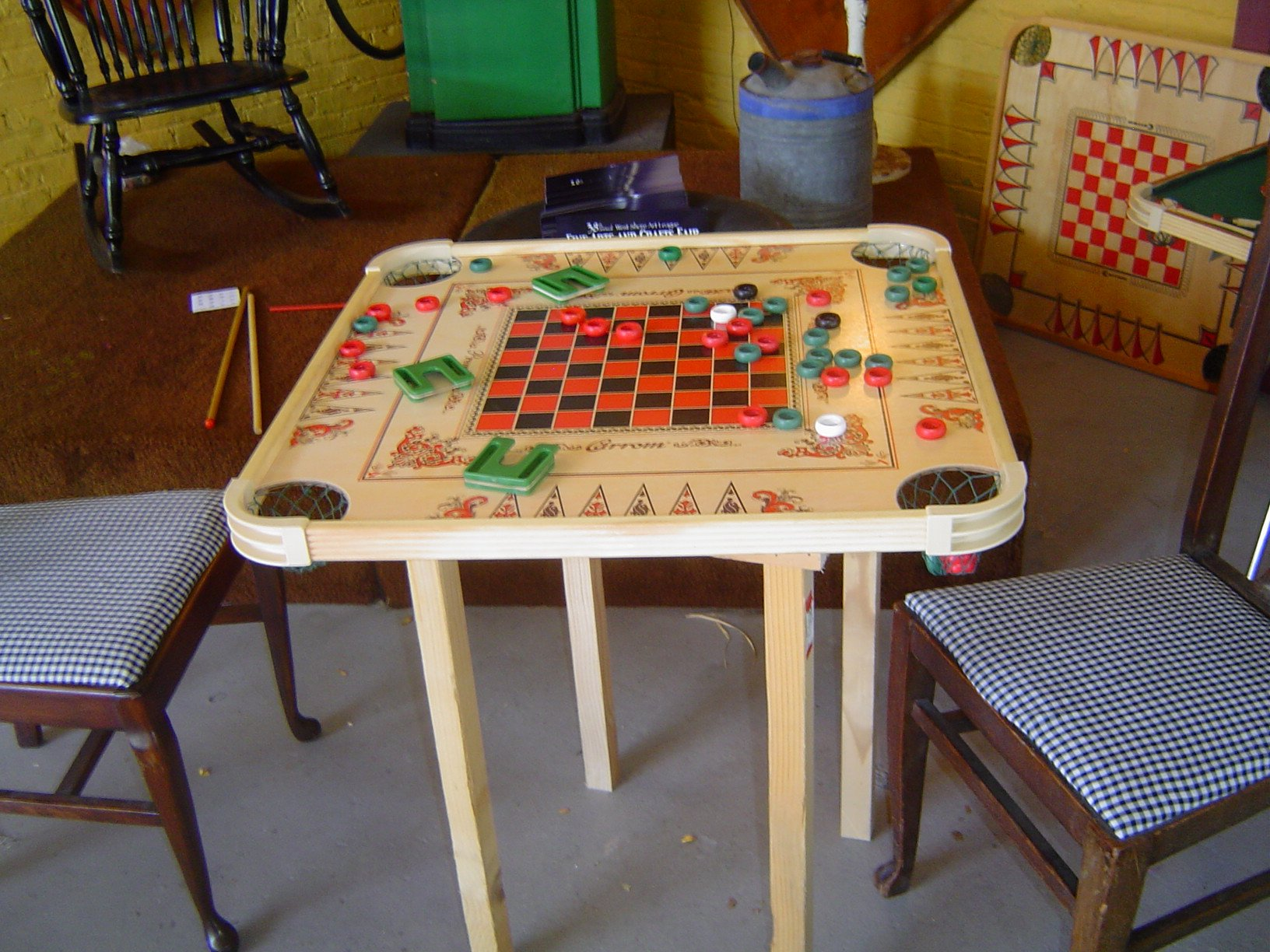

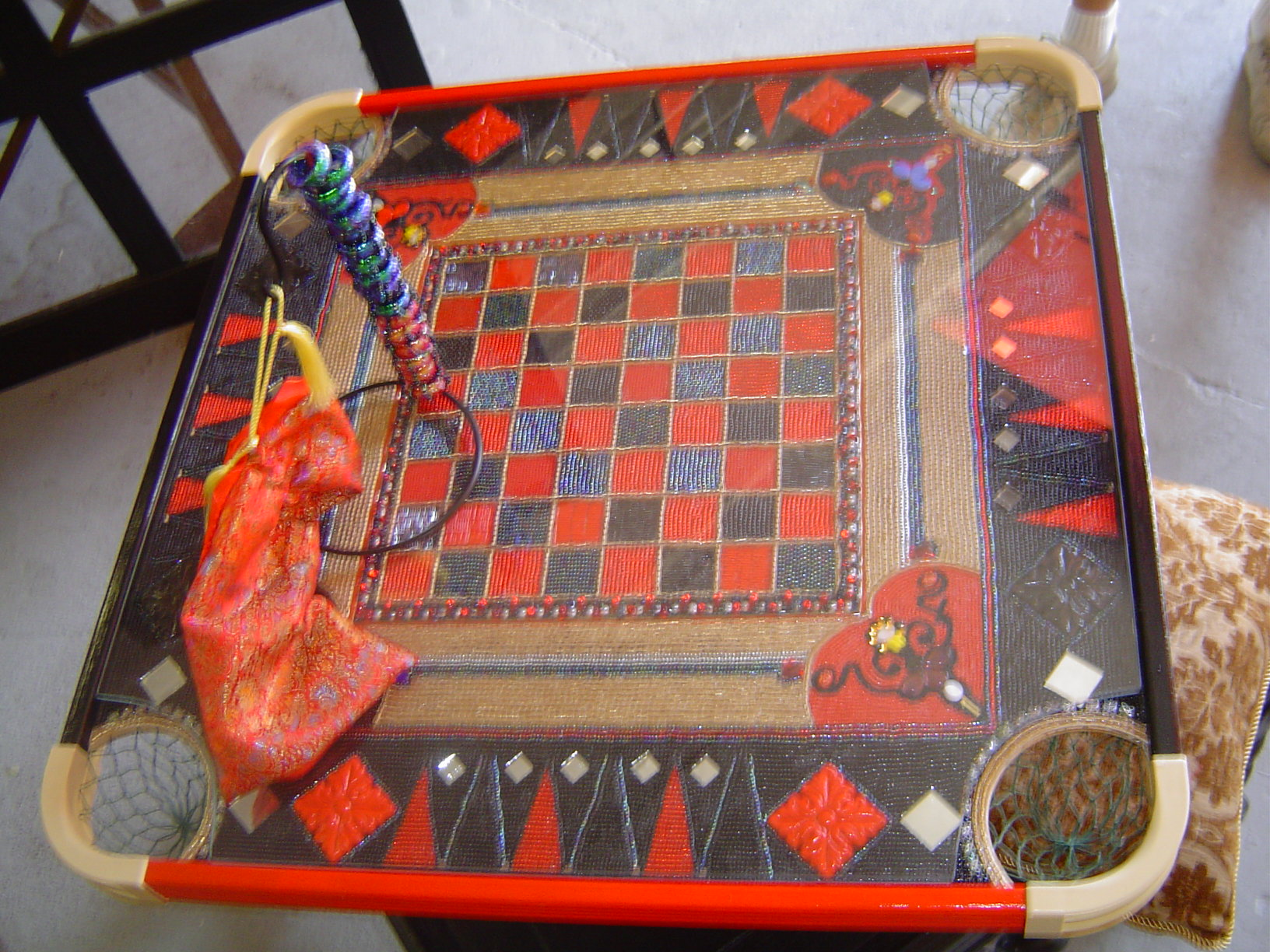

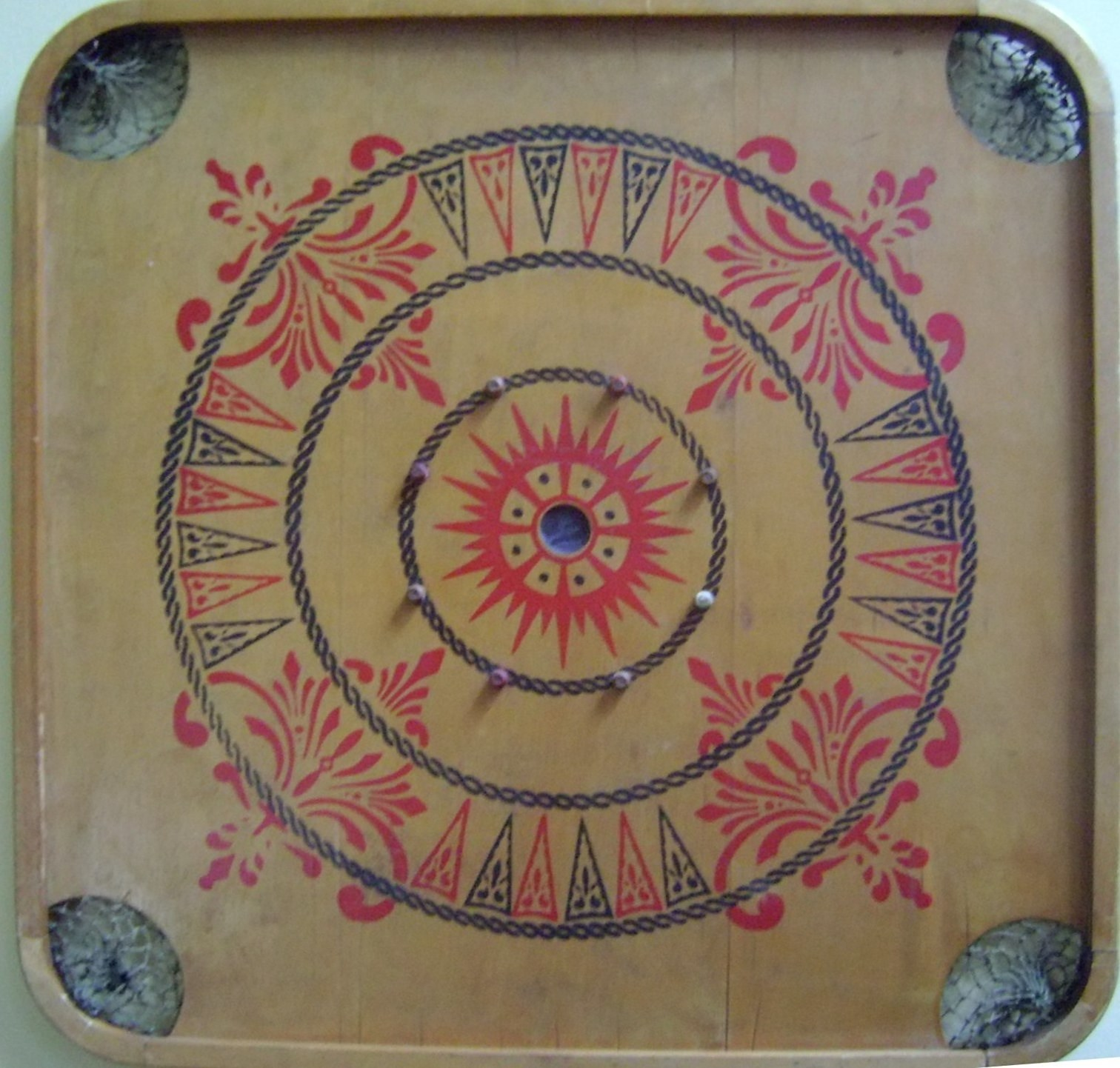

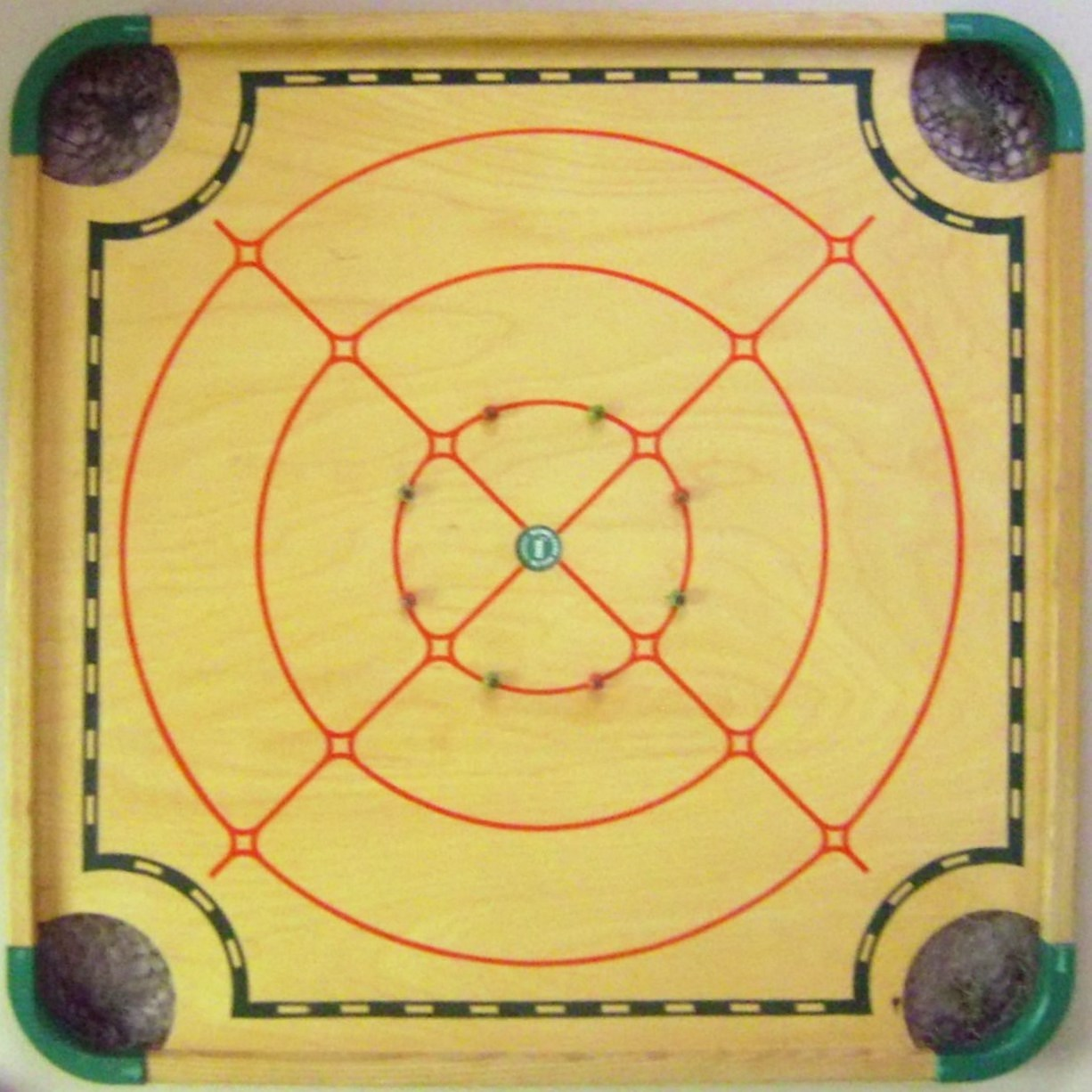

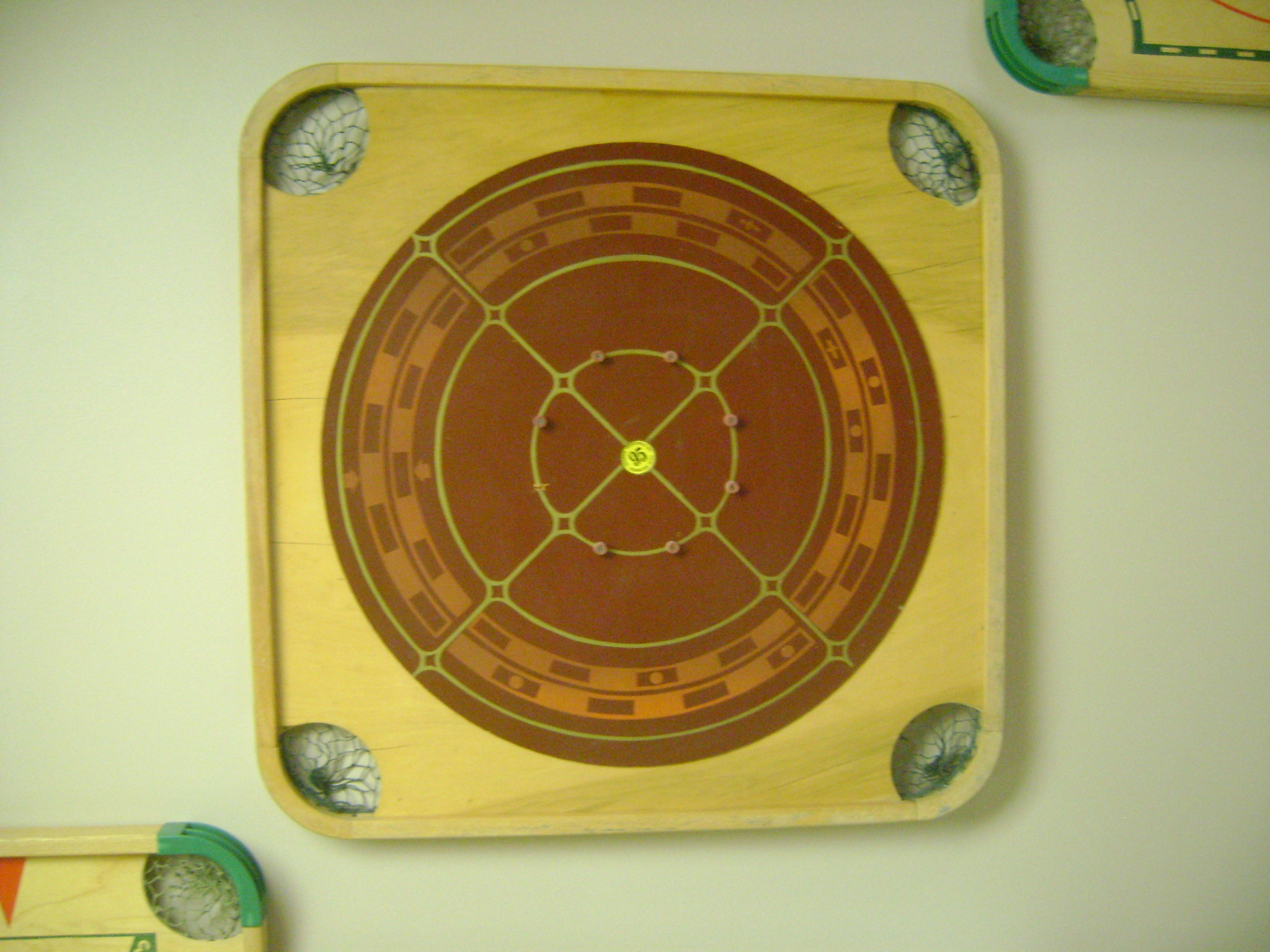

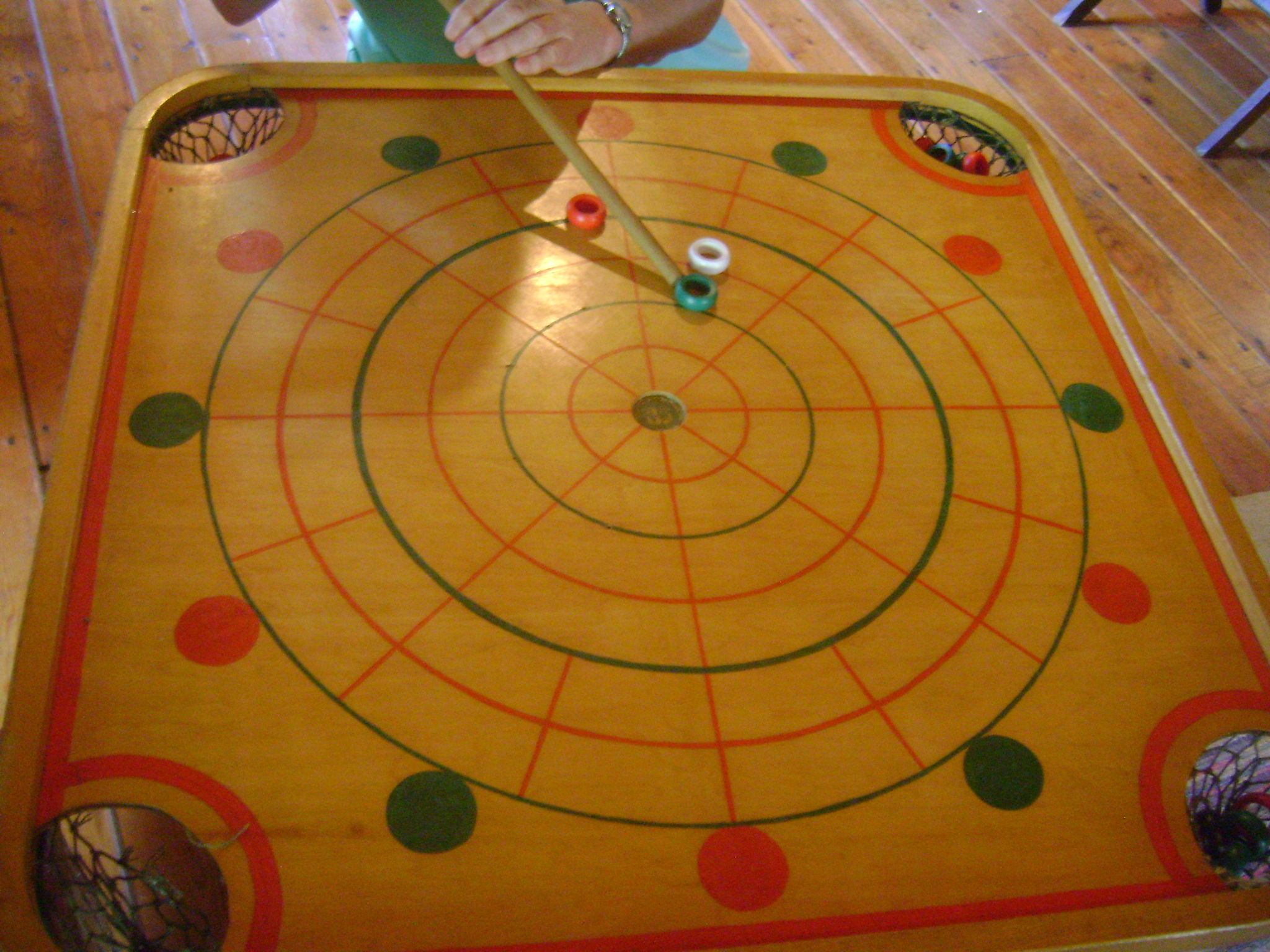
