= Pitchnut =

Canadian-American tabletop Disk-Flicking Game

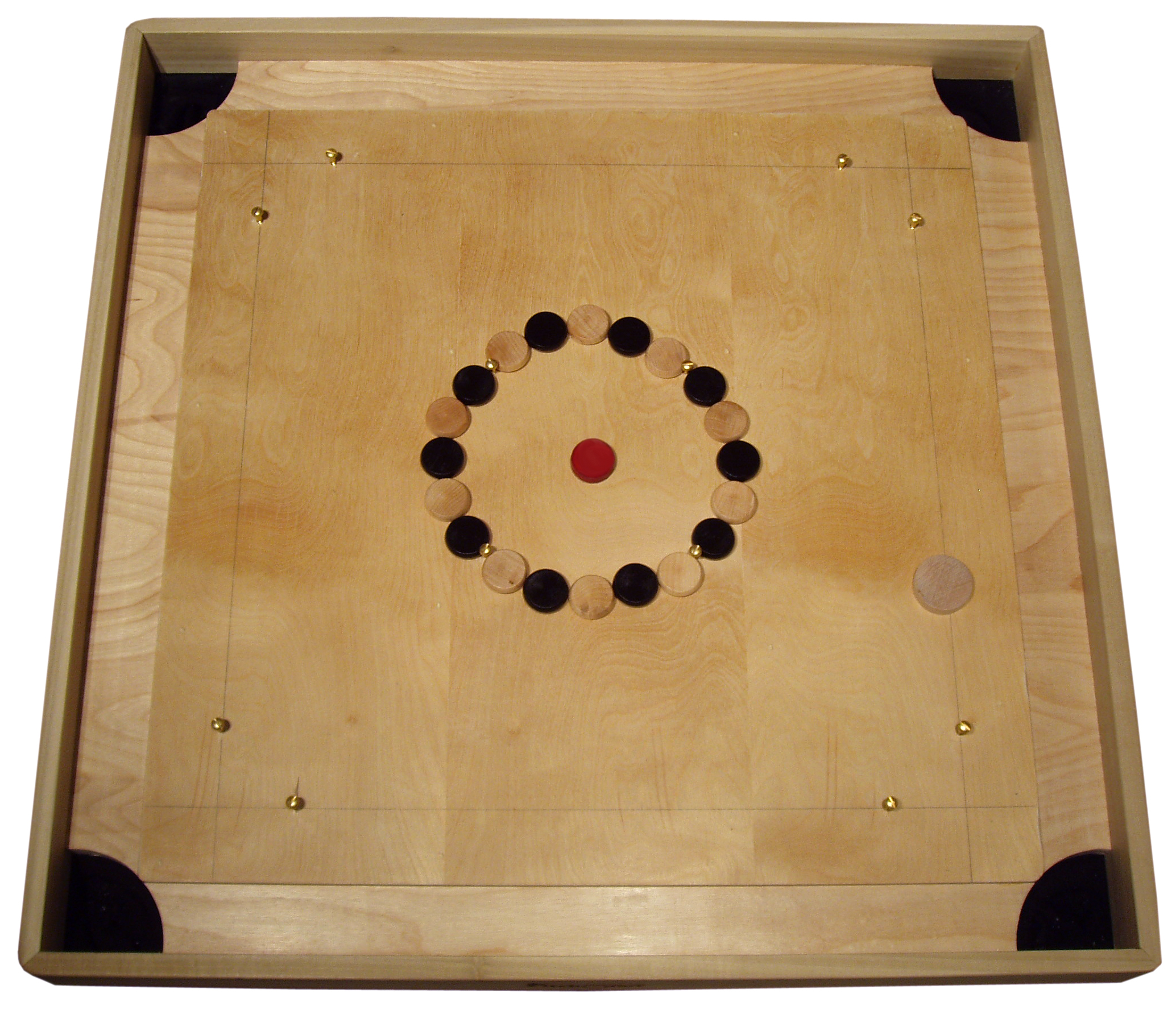
Pitchnut board

Pitchnut is a wooden tabletop game of French Canadian origins, similar to carrom, crokinole and pichenotte, with mechanics that lie somewhere between pocket billiards and air hockey.

Unlike with other wooden board games, there are no records of pitchnut being mass-produced; all existing boards are handmade. Although pitchnut is not a patented game and is in the public domain, the names "Pitchnut" and "Pichenotte" have been trademarked.

In French-speaking areas of Canada, the game is called pichenotte, which is French for "flick." There are several other disk-flicking games which are also referred to as 'pichenotte' by French speakers. Many modern boards are in use, made mostly by Lee Larcheveque, and before him, by Achille Scalabrini, in Sainte-Edwidge-de-Clifton, Quebec, Canada. The game is common on the farming villages near Coaticook, Quebec, Canada; in Maine; and in Amherst, Massachusetts, United States.

== Origins ==
Pitchnut board in Compton, Quebec

Very little about the history of the game has been written. Crokinole historian Wayne Kelly states that the game may be one of many efforts to combine crokinole with pichenotte, the French Canadian version of carrom. A similar board was patented in 1893 by E.L. Williams, but that game board had 8 pegs in the center of the board (like crokinole) but had only one peg in front of each pocket. Wayne Kelly's crokinole.com web site shows an image of a board that looks very similar to pitchnut (called "improved crokinole"), but the pegs in front of the pockets take the form of a wicket through which the players had to shoot their pieces, according to Mr. Kelly. Pitchnut was primarily played in the farming villages around Coaticook, Quebec, where Achille Scalabrini built the games during the mid-twentieth century. As descendants of those villages moved to small cities and the U.S., the game has spread.

== Equipment ==
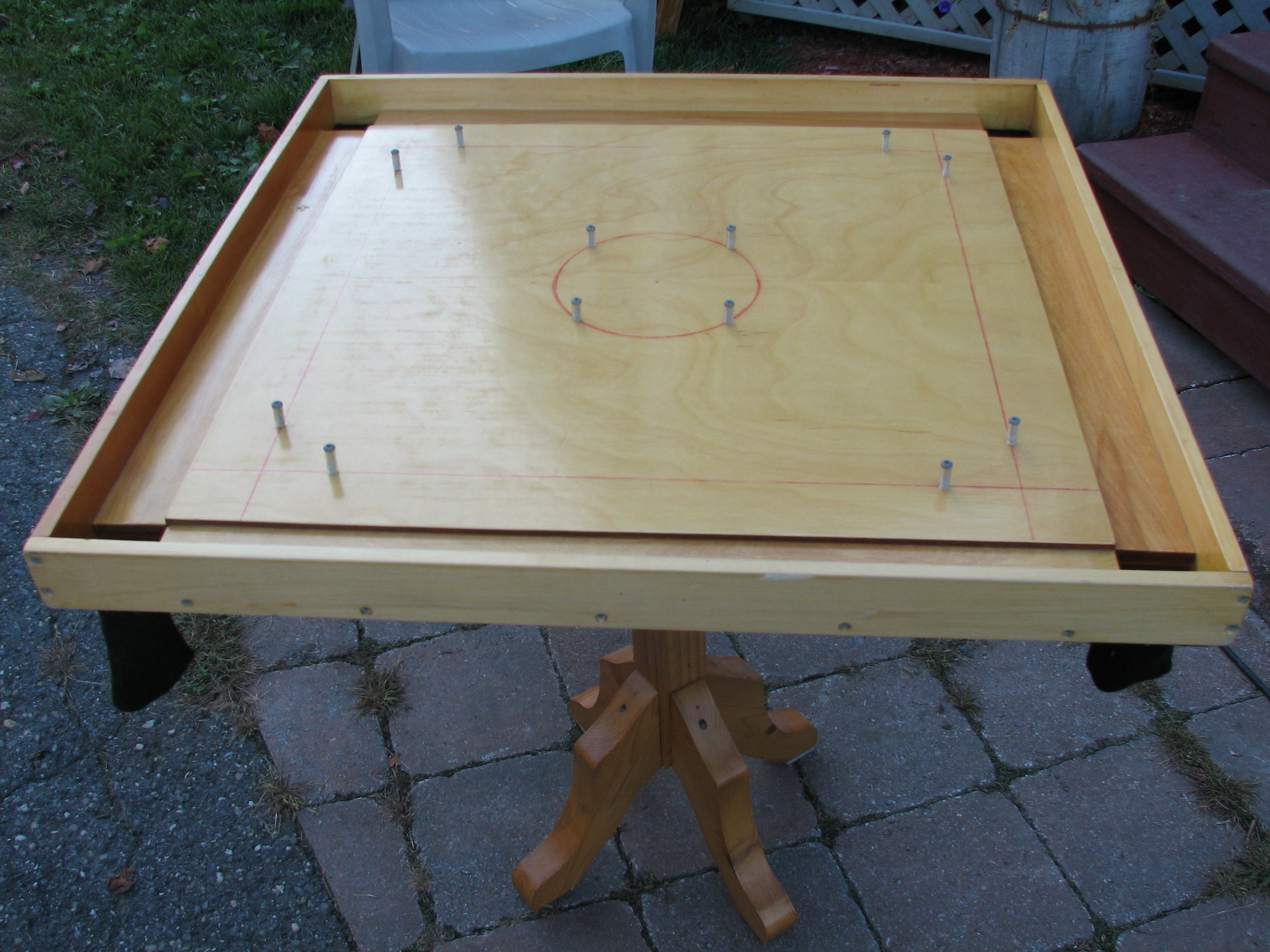
A pitchnut board in St. Edwidge, Quebec

The game is played on a wooden board, normally 28 inches square. It differs from carrom and pichenotte boards in that it has a 2-inch gutter along the entire circumference of the board. It is likely that the recessed gutters were added to direct playing pieces toward the pockets. In Carrom or pichenotte, a piece that is struck will not be guided towards the pockets. Pitchnut also has 4 pegs (or "screws") in the center of the board and two pegs in front of each pocket. The pegs in the center of the board may have been added to help position the pieces into a consistent circular formation. The game is played with small wooden discs.

The object of the game is to finger-flick a comparatively heavy disk, called a striker, shooter or pitch, such that it contacts lighter object discs and propels them into one of four corner pockets. The pieces come in two sets, usually white and black, denoting the two players (or, in doubles play, teams). An additional piece is colored (red and green are common) and called the "poison", which is the disc equivalent of the eight ball in pool games.

== Rules ==
Beginning of the game setup

American pitchnut is played with rules that are very similar to eight-ball pool. The goal is to sink all of one's object pieces and the "poison" or eight-ball before one's opponent does.

Play begins with alternating ten differently colored pieces in a ring in the center of the board. Five pieces fit between each peg. An off-colored piece (poison) is placed in the center of the board.

Flicking the shooter.

There are two main variations in rules- Canadian and American, though rules may also vary among families. In all variations, object pieces must be struck with a larger shooter. The shooter must remain either entirely or half way behind each player's home line. The shooter must be returned to the home line before each shot.

The shooter is usually shot with the index or middle finger and thumb in a flicking action ("pichenotte" in French). The shooter may be pushed briefly with a finger, in a shoving motion, without the use of the thumb, but may not be pushed or dragged with the finger ("carried") across the player's home line.

If the poison is sunk before all of a player's pieces are pocketed, that player loses. Games usually last around five minutes. Canadian pitchnut uses the same rules as pichenotte, a similar game that does not have pegs or recessed gutters. The object is to score 50 points before your opponent does. A player earns five points for each of his opponents pieces that remain on the board. The odd-colored piece (dame) is worth fifteen points and can be shot in at any time (some rules require that a player "cover" the dame by immediately sinking one of his/her own pieces. Some families/regions play with two odd-colored pieces in the center. A game can consist of several rounds of play, and a game can last 20 minutes or more.

== See also ==
- Carrom
- Chapayev
- Crokinole
- Novuss
- Pichenotte
