= Novuss =

Cue sport of Latvia and Estonia

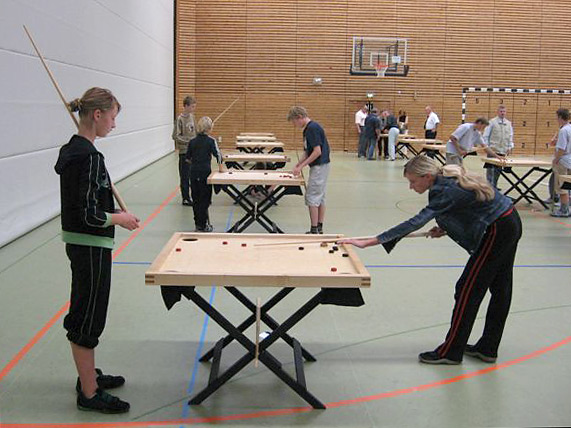
Novuss players at the Baltic Children's Olympics, 2006

Novuss (also known as koroona or korona) is a two-player (or four-player, doubles) game of physical skill which is closely related to carrom and pocket billiards. Novuss originates from Estonia and Latvia, where it is a national sport. The board is approximately 100 centimetres (39 in) square, typically made of wood, has pockets in each corner, and lines marked on the surface. The board is usually placed on a stand, but may be placed on a barrel or other surface that allows the pockets to hang down properly. It uses small discs instead of balls, and each player has a small puck instead of the cue ball used in other cue sports. Players use a small cue stick to propel their pucks into their colored object discs (the novuss equivalent of object balls), knocking them into the pockets. The winner is the first one to sink all eight of their object discs (of which there are sixteen in total in two different-coloured sets, plus the two pucks).

The game is sometimes informally referred to as Baltic billiards or Scandinavian billiards, but the latter is a misnomer, since neither Latvia nor Estonia are part of Scandinavia. On the other hand, in Sweden and Denmark, a similar game is played under the names couronne and bob respectively. However, unlike in novuss, the object discs in couronne/bob are arranged into a circle formation on the centre of the board like in carrom, and each player is given fifteen discs instead of eight.

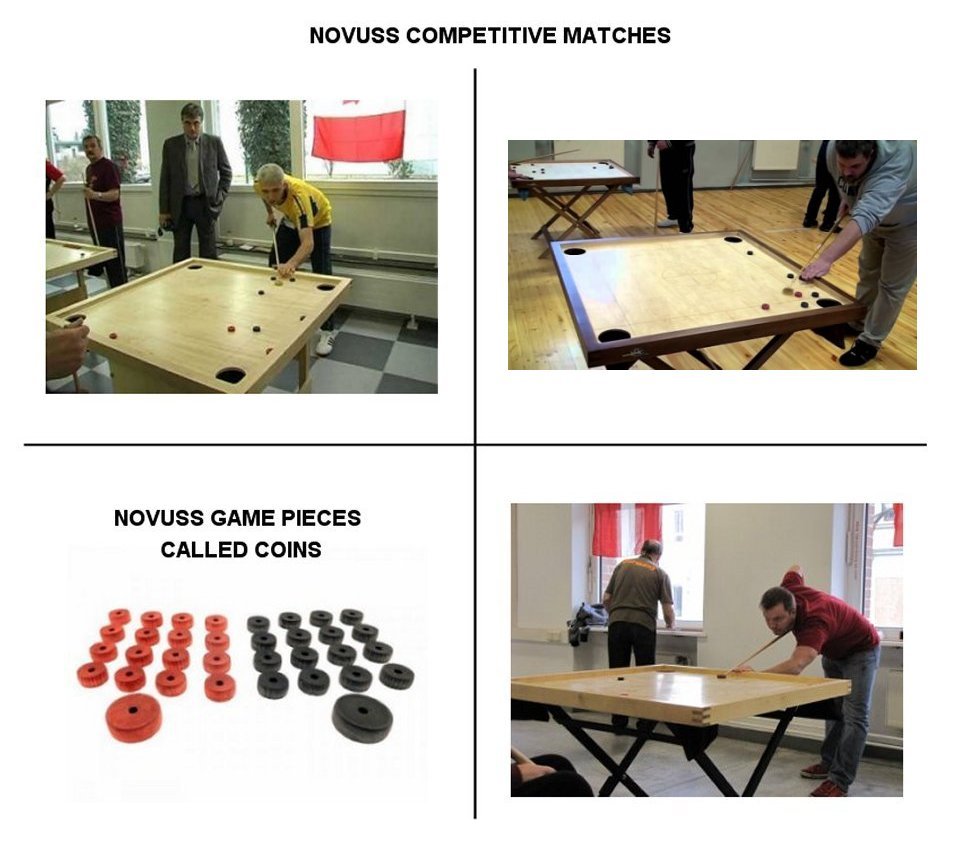
Novuss games and coins

A game similar to novuss is also played in the Philippines. The table in this game, however, is rotatable.

== History ==
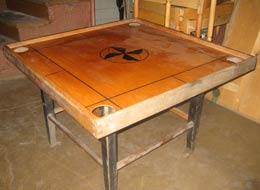
80-year-old novuss board from the Latvian Novuss Federation

According to Jānis-Ēriks Piebalgs, President of Latvian Novuss Federation, the game was first played in Northern Europe, particularly Latvia and Estonia around 1925–1927. According to "Korona õpetus" (1930) novuss was brought to the Baltic countries from Northern Europe by the seamen. Among the countries Germany and Sweden are mentioned.

The game appears to have developed from billiards as a shipboard game. The compact size of the board and comparatively stationary nature of the discs in response to the rocking of the vessel on the water made it practical as an onboard game. It has been called the equivalent of "sea billiards" in some languages such as Russian.

Latvian seamen, while visiting ports of England, played a similar game in the local pubs. The first tables were made from blueprints brought back from England. In the beginning, novuss was played in the port cities Ventspils, Liepāja, and Tallinn. In some countries, novuss is also known by Estonian name koroona (archaic for 'crown', modern kroon) or a local variant. The oldest known record of the rules of the game printed in a book dates to 1930 (book in Estonian, called "Korona õpetus"). Before that the rules were printed in Estonian magazines and newspapers. In Estonia the first known novuss clubs were formed in 1927. The first competitions were held before the year 1930 (mentioned in "Korona õpetus") and official rules were needed. In Latvia, the game spread even more quickly than in Estonia, and soon emerged as a national sport. The first professional competition took place in 1932, in which Albert Raminsch won 1st place. In Finland, the furniture factory Oy Huonekalutehdas ja Sorvimo introduced the game, known as korona, in the port city of Turku in 1926.

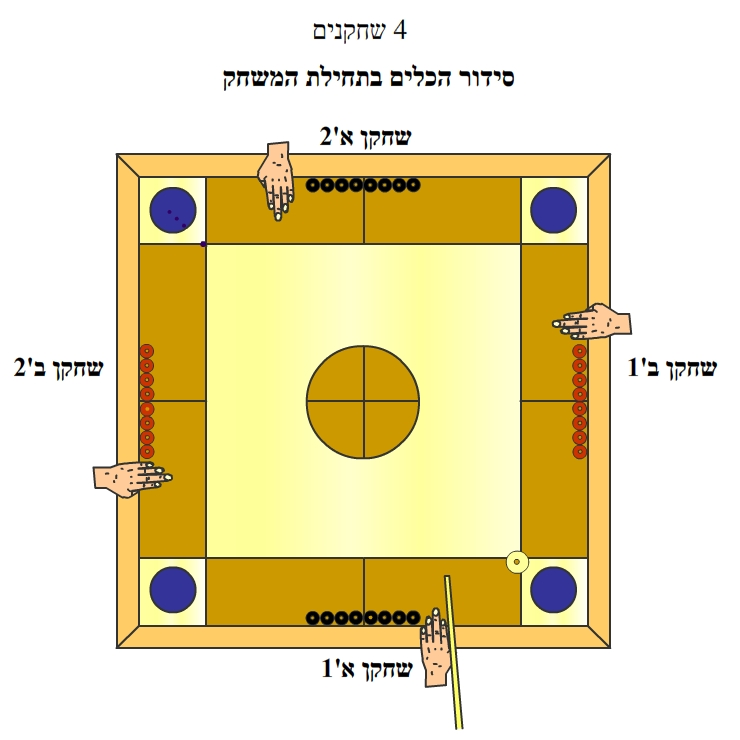
Setup for a four-player game of novuss

The Latvian Novuss Federation was founded on 6 December 1963. National championships have been held since 1964 in singles and since 1966 in team competitions. Men's, women's and junior's (up to 15 years old) divisions have been established.

In 1980, the novuss community contained around 55,000 members. In the meantime, district, city, national and world championships are regularly organized. Novuss became one of the three most popular sports in Latvia.

== Events ==
The game is further establishing itself in the United States, Canada, Israel, Georgia, Ukraine, Australia, England, Russia, Finland and Germany. The International Novuss Championship has been held annually, beginning in 1993, with teams from countries where Novuss has a large following, especially Latvia and Estonia.

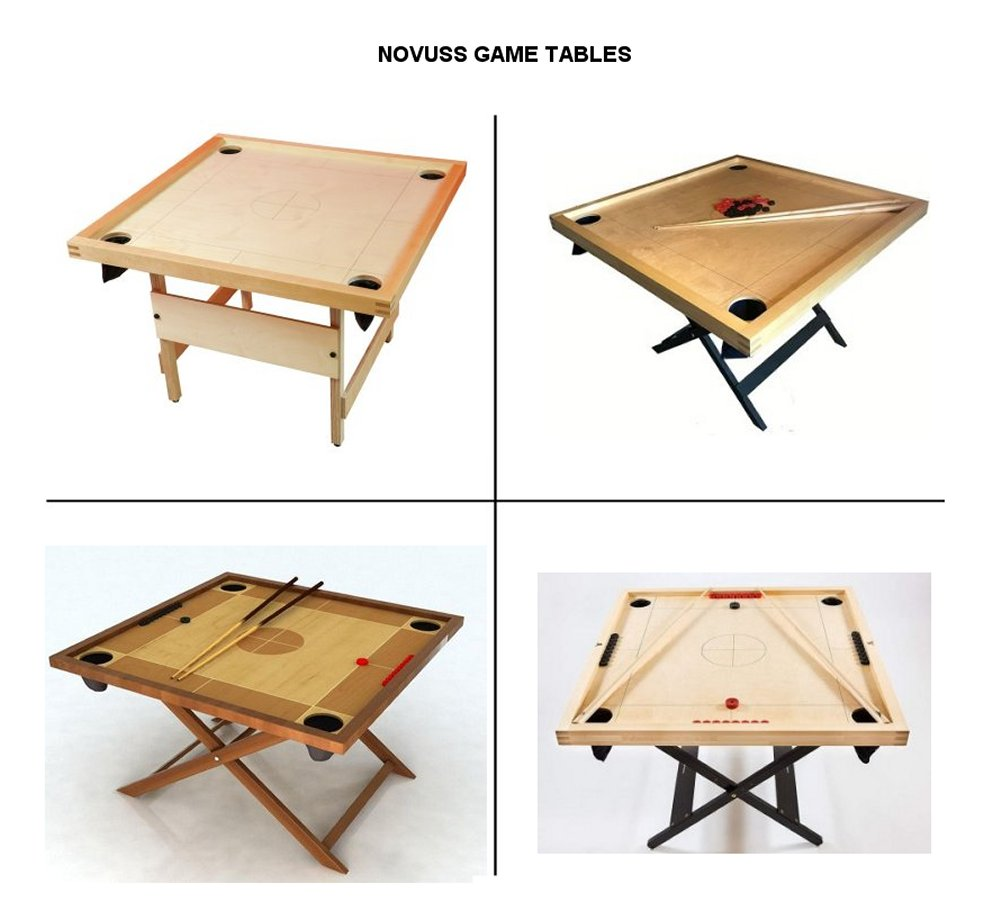

Novuss was integrated into the roster of the first Baltic Children's Olympics on 30 September 2006.

=== World Cup ===
The Federation International of Novuss-Sport Organizations (FINSO) hosts international competitions.

== See also ==
- Carrom
- Crokinole
- Pichenotte
- Pitchnut
- Chapayev (game)
- Golf billiards
