= Karambal =

- Village
- Country: India
- State: Karnataka
- District: Belgaum

Languages
  - Official: Marathi
- Time zone: UTC+5:30 (IST)

Karambal is a village in Belgaum district in Karnataka, India. Karambal village is located in Khanapur Tehsil of Belgaum district in Karnataka, India. It is situated 3 km (1.9 mi) from sub-district headquarters Khanapur and 28 km (17 mi) from district headquarters Belgaum. As per 2009 stats, Karmbla is the gram panchayat of Karambal village. The total geographical area of village is 387.3 hectares (957 acres). Karambal has a total population of 1,400 people. There are about 294 houses in Karambal village. Khanapur is the nearest town to Karambal, and is approximately 3 km (1.9 mi) away.
