= 8th Carrom ICF Cup 2019 =

International carrom competition

8th ICF cup 2019 (Carrom)
Tournament information
- Date: 2-6 December 2019
- Host: All-India Carrom Federation (AICF)
- Venue: Maharashtra, India
- Participants: Bangladesh, Maldives, US, UK, Canada, Poland, Serbia, UAE, Switzerland, Slovenia, India, Sri Lanka, Malaysia, Italy, France and Germany
- Champion: India (men)
- Runner-up: Sri Lanka (men)
- Champion: India (women)
- Runner-up: Maldives (women)

The 8th edition of the ICF Carrom cup was held in Pune, India from 2 to 6 December 2019. This was the 3rd consecutive ICF cup India has hosted. India won the men's team event and women's team event title.

Irshad Ahmed Ansari of India defeated 2018 World Cup winner Prashant More to claim his maiden international trophy in the men's singles event. In the women's singles event, S. Apoorva of India beat Ayesha Mohamed of India to complete a hat trick of international titles as she won the singles title in 2016 Carrom World Championship and 2018 Carrom World Cup.

== Participating teams ==
A total of 16 nations participated in the 5 day fiesta.

1. Sri Lanka
2. India
3. Maldives
4. Bangladesh
5. Canada
6. United States
7. Poland
8. France
9. Germany
10. Malaysia
11. United Kingdom
12. Serbia
13. Switzerland
14. Slovenia
15. Italy
16. United Arab Emirates

== Men's team event ==
A total of 16 teams participated in the men's team event. The top 8 teams were selected to compete in a knockout round based on players' performance in the singles event. India defeated Sri Lanka (3–0) to win the men's title while Bangladesh beat Maldives (2–1) to win the bronze medal.

Team	Players
Sri Lanka	Anas Ahmed; Nishantha Fernando; Shaheed Hilmy; Dinet Dulakshan
India	Rajesh Gohil; Prashant More; Irshad Ahmed Ansari; Zaheer Pasha
United States	Shibu Jose; Sam Mallisetti; Ajay Arora; Ranjit Sapre
Maldives	Ali Azim; Ismail Azmeen; Adam Adeel; Mohamed Munthasir
Bangladesh	Hafizur Rahman; Mohamed Ali "Robin"; Hemaeth Molla; Sala uddin Kaiser
France	Pierre Dubois; Fabian Pereira; Venou Mouraly
United Kingdom	Nazrul Islam; Mohamed Sunahar Ali; Sugukumar Sekar; Chandan Narkar
Poland	Jakub Sasinski; Pankaj Monga; Bartosz Sasinski; Nitesh Sinha
Switzerland	Josef Meyer
Malaysia	Christopher Walter; Sahidin Sahipul; Abdul Muthalib Ismail; Abdul Rahman Zakaria
Germany	Peter Bocker; Sebastian Holtman; Dirk Pochlow; Jorg Johannes
United Arab Emirates	Mohamed Azam Khan; Nathar Ali
Serbia	Momcilo Danic; Aleksandar Tanaskovic
Canada	Louis Fernandes; Moaz Sheihk; Wajahatulla Mohamed; Rupkrishna Dangoi
Italy	Gianluca Christiani; Dineth Hapuarachchige; Nicolo Gallo; Paolo Martinelli
Slovenia	Tadej Salamun

=== Men's team event results ===
1. India
2. Sri Lanka
3. Bangladesh
4. Maldives
5. United States
6. Canada
7. France
8. United Kingdom

== Women's team event ==
Seven teams participated in the women's team event. The top 4 teams qualified based on the players' performance in the singles event. India won the women's team event, beating Sri Lanka (3–0) in the finals. The Maldives women's team achieved 2nd rank for the first time in 12 years in the international arena. They beat Sri Lanka 2–1 in the semi-finals. Sri Lanka claimed 3rd place by beating Bangladesh with a 3–0 win.

Team	Players
Sri Lanka	Roshita Joseph (c); Maduka Dilshani; M.Chitradevi; Rebeca Dalrine
India	Rashmi Kumari (c); K. Nagajyothi; S. Apoorva; Ayesha Mohammed
Maldives	Aminath Visama (v); Aminath Vidhaadh; Aminath Shuba Adam; Fathimath Rayana
Malaysia	Sharifah Azmi; Masnoora Hashim; Suzana Salim
Italy	Elissa Zuchiatti; Danielle De Fatti
Poland	Paulina Novakowska
Bangladesh	Afsana Nasrin; Shumsune Maksuda; Raima Chadni; Sabina Akhtar

=== Women's team event results ===
1. India
2. Maldives
3. Sri Lanka
4. Bangladesh

== Swiss league ==
86 players participated in the mixed singles event. A maximum of 8 (4 men and 4 women) players from each country was given entry to play in this event, whereas sixteen players from the host (India) competed in this event. Zaheer Pasha from India won the Swiss league undefeated and scoring 5 slams in 8 matches. Anil Munde from India claimed 2nd Place while 2014 World Cup Champion Komaravelli Srinivas was the 3rd rank.

=== Swiss league ranking (top 15) ===
1. Zaheeer Pasha - India
2. Anil Munde - India
3. Komaravelli Srinivas - India
4. Irshad Ahmed - India
5. Kumarii Kajal - India
6. Rajesh Gohil - India
7. Prashant Suryakant More - India
8. WD Nishantha Fernando - Sri Lanka
9. Louis Fernandes - Canada
10. Anas Ahamed - Sri Lanka
11. Hafizur Rahman - Bangladesh
12. Rashmi Kumari - India
13. Sandeep Dive - India
14. Abhijeet Tripankar - India
15. Nilam Ghodake - India

== Men's singles ==
A total of 32 players who qualified to singles event were divided in to 8 groups. The top 2 qualified to the round of 16. Irshad Ahmed of India beat world champion Prashant More 2–1 to claim the title. This tournament was Irshad Ahmed's first International. Prashant More failed to make history by winning 3 consecutive International titles. Rajesh Gohil of India beat fan's favourite Zaheer Pasha 2–1 to claim third place.

=== Men's singles top 8 ranking ===
1. Irshad Ahamed - India
2. Prashant Suryakant More - India
3. Gohil Rajesh - India
4. Zaheer Paasha - India
5. Hemaet Molla - Bangladesh
6. Nishantha Fernando - Sri Lanka
7. Shaheed Hilmy - Sri Lanka
8. Ismail "Neal" Azmeen - Maldives

== Women's singles ==
24 players competed in the group stage. The top 2 from each group competed in the quarter-finals. S.Apoorva of India beat Ayesha Mohamed of India to complete a hatrick of international titles as she won the singles title in 2016 Carrom World Championship and 2018 Carrom World Cup. Former World Champion Rashmi Kumari of India beat young star Nagajyothi to win 3rd Place.

=== Women's singles top 8 ranking ===
1. S. Apoorva - India
2. Ayesha Mohamed - India
3. Rashmii Kumari - India
4. Nagarjyothi - India
5. Rebeca Dalrine - Sri Lanka
6. Maduka Dilshani - Sri Lanka
7. Aminath Vidhaadh - Maldives
8. Roshita Joseph - Sri Lanka
