= 2018 Carrom World Cup =

Carrom tournament

Tournament information
- Dates: 23 August–29 August
- Administrator: International Carrom Federation
- Tournament format(s): Double Round-robin and Knockout
- Host: South Korea
- Venue: 1
- Participants: 17
- Website: www.c-leisure.org

Final positions
- Champions: Sri Lanka (Men); India (Women)
- 1st runners-up: India (Men); Sri Lanka (Women)
- 2nd runners-up: France (Men); Maldives (Women)

The 2018 Carrom World Cup was the 5th edition of the Carrom World Cup which held in the city of Chuncheon, South Korea for 7 days from 23 August to 26 August. This was staged as the first international carrom tournament since the 2016 Carrom World Championship and also marked the first Carrom World Cup to be held in South Korea. The World Cup was hosted in Chuncheon as a part of the 2018 World Leisure Games which includes other sports such as ice hockey, slalom, taekwondo and darts. Sri Lanka won the men's Carrom World Cup and India won the women's World Cup tournament in their respective finals mayil is the winner.

India were the defending world champions which won the title in 2014 featured alongside hosts South Korea, Sri Lanka, Maldives, Bangladesh, United States, France, Japan and Czech Republic.

In the men's carrom tournament final, Sri Lanka defeated defending world champions India by 2-1 in the men's team event to secure their maiden Carrom World Cup title. India defeated Sri Lanka 3-0 in the women's team tournament final to defend the title.

Indian carrom player Kajal Kumari became the first ever woman to clinch the overall combined Swiss League title after defeating defending Swiss League champion Chamil Cooray of Sri Lanka in the final.

Both men and women carrom players representing India won the singles and doubles titles at the World Cup. India's Prashant More won the men's singles world title and India's S. Apoorva claimed the women's singles title defeating the Swiss League winner Kajal Kumari.

== Participating teams ==
Sri Lanka sent 8 players including four men and four women for the event including former carrom world champion Nishantha Fernando (2012) and 2 time Swiss League winner Chamil Cooray.

The United States Carrom Association has selected a men's team of 4 led by Shibu Jose.

Czech Republic national level champion Horst Šimunský will lead the Czech Republic delegation at the event.

=== Controversy ===
On 22 June 2018, the International Carrom Federation earlier rejected the entry list of India for the World Cup as the entry list was alleged to have approved by a member of the ad hoc committee appointed by India's High Court instead of a regular executive committee member of All India Carrom Federation. However on 3 July 2018, the ICF later accepted India's entry list for the World Cup as it was later confirmed by the secretary of All India Carrom Federation.

== Men's teams ==
Team	Players
Sri Lanka	Chamil Cooray (c); Nishantha Fernando; Shaheed Hilmy; Udesh Chandima
India	Riyaz Akbar Ali; Prashant More; Sagayabharati; Zaheer Pasha
United States	Shibu Jose; Murali Balasubramanyam; Dr. Shivaram Gowdegere; Deep Joshi
Maldives	Ali Azim; Ismail Azmeen; Hassan Nazim; Mohamed Munthasir
France	Pierre Dubois; Fabian Pereira; Fransisco Fernandes; Venou Mouraly
United Kingdom	Nazrul Islam; Mohamed Sunahar Ali; Rahat Islam; Josep Glasberg
Poland	Sylwester Pogorzelski; Robert Bany; Bartosz Sasinski; Jakub Novakowski
Switzerland	Josef Meyer; Peter Baumgartner; Kurt Scherrer
Pakistan	Zahid Gaffar; Osama bin Murtaza
Germany	Peter Wolfgang; Sebastian Holtman
Qatar	Yousuff Ameer Khan; Khaleel Safiullah Khan; Thivaka Pereira
Japan	Toru Matsubara; Hiro Shibano; Dhammike Samarasekara
Korea	Jun Junoh; Doh Hyun Im; Shabeen Oh; Dok Yung Kim
Italy	Ayesh Vandelan; Nicolo Gallo; Paolo Martinelli
Czech Republic	Horst Šimunský

=== Results (Team) ===
Total 16 team Participated in men's team event. Sri Lanka beat India 2-1 to win the first Carrom World Cup title in men's team event. And France beat Maldives (2-1) to win bronze medal. The men's team event finals was held on 26 August.

Men's team event final result

Zaheer Pasha (IND) beat Shaheed Hilmy (SRI) 25-22 & 25-11

Nishantha Fernando (SRI) beat K Sagayabharati (IND) 25-22 & 25-7

Chamil Cooray (SRI) beat Prashant More (IND) 3-25, 25-15 & 25-21

Men's team event Bronze medal match result

Pierre Dubois (FRA) beat Ismail Azmeen (MDV) (2-1)

Ali Azim (MDV) beat Fabian Pereira (FRA) - (2-0)

Francisco Fernandes (FRA) beat Hassan Nazim (MDV) - (2-1)

== Men's Team event Draw ==
	Teams
Group A	Sri Lanka; Qatar; Italy; Switzerland
Group B	France; United States; Germany; Serbia
Group C	Maldives; United Kingdom; Korea; Pakistan
Group D	India; Poland; Japan; Malaysia

== Women's teams ==
Team	Players
Sri Lanka	Yasika Rahubaddha (c); Joseph Roshita; Chalani Lakmali; Madhuka Dilshani
India	Rashmi Kumari (c); Kajal Kumari; S. Apoorva; Aysha Mohammed
Maldives	Aminath Visama (v); Aminath Vidhaadh; Aminath Shuba Adam; Fathimath Rayana
Korea	Sanghee Oh; Jung min Yu; Myung Soo Han; Hyung joo Lee
Italy	Elissa Zuchiatti
Japan	Tokomo isome
Slovenia	lea Psenicnik
France	Stephanie Pidial; Laitetia Pidial

== Women's Team event ==
Total 8 team Participated in Women's team event. Women's team event was played in Round Robin format. Top 4 Teams got Qualified for Semi finals. India beat Korea (3-0) in semi final 1, and Sri Lanka beat Maldives (2-1) in Semi final 2. India beat Sri Lanka 3-0 to win their fifth Carrom World Cup title in women's team event. Maldives beat Korea (3-0) to win bronze medal. The Women's team event finals was held on 26 August.

Women's team event final result

Rashmi Kumari (IND) beat Roshita Joseph (SRI) 19-15 & 25-23

Kajal Kumari (IND) beat Chalani Lakmali (SRI) 25-11 & 25-12

S Apoorva (IND) beat Yasika Rahubaddha (SRI) 25-12 & 25-23

Women's team event bronze Medal match result

Aminath Visama (MDV) beat Sanghee Oh (KOR) - (3-0)

Aminath Vidhaadh (MDV) beat Myung Soo Han (KOR) - (3-0)

Aminath Shuba Adam (MDV) beat Hyung joo Lee (KOR) - (3-0)

== Swiss League ==
Total 86 players competed in the Swiss league. Indian Women's team starlet Kajal Kumari became the first ever woman to clinch the overall combined Swiss League title after defeating defending Swiss League champion Chamil Cooray of Sri Lanka in the final. She also beat former world runner-up Riyaz Akbar Ali to justify her achievement in the process.

Swiss league top 15 Ranking

1. Kajal Kumari (IND)

2. Chamil Coorey (SRI)

3. Sagayarbharati K. (IND)

4. Prashant More (IND)

5. Ali Azim (MDV)

6. Zaheer Pasha (IND)

7. Riyaz Akbar Ali (IND)

8. Nishanta Fernando (SRI)

9. Yousuff Ameer Khan (QAT)

10. Rashmi Kumari (IND)

11. Mohamed Shaheed Hilmy (SRI)

12. Ismail Azmeen (MDV)

13. Mouraly Venou (FRA)

14. Aminath Vidhaadh (MDV)

15. Ayesha Mohamed (IND)

== Men's Singles ==
Total 32 players who qualified to singles event were divided in to 8 groups. Top 2 Qualified to Round of 16. After 2 full days of intense matches Prashant More (IND) beat Riyaz Akbar Ali (IND) in the breathtaking Men's Singles Final. Zaheer Pasha (IND) claimed 3rd place after beating Nishanta Fernando (SRI).

Men's Singles Top 8

1. Prashant More (IND)

2. Riyaz Akbar Ali (IND)

3. Zaheer Pasha (IND)

4. Nishanta Fernando (SRI)

5. Sagayarbharati K. (IND)

6. Chamil Coorey (SRI)

7. Mohamed Shaheed Hilmy (SRI)

8. Pierre Dubois (FRA)

== Women's Singles ==
Top 24 women's players who qualified to singles event were divided in to 4 groups. Top 2 Qualified to Round of 16. S.Spoorva (IND) beat Swiss league champion Kajal Kumari (IND) in Women's Singles Final. Rashmi Kumari (IND) claimed 3rd place beating Ayesha Mohamed (IND).

Women's Singles Top 8

1. S.Apoorva (IND)

2. Kajal Kumari (IND)

3. Rashmi Kumari (IND)

4. Ayesha Mohamed (IND)

5. Yasika Rahubaddha (SRI)

6. Chalani Lakmali (SRI)

7. Roshita Joseph (SRI)

8. Aminath Shuba Adam (MDV)
