= Sports in Tamil Nadu =

Sports are a significant part of life in Tamil Nadu, with the southern Indian state emerging as the sports capital of the Indian subcontinent. The inhabitants of Tamil Nadu enjoy participating in sports both originating from their homeland and other sports from abroad. This article details these sports, both traditional and modern, that are commonly played in Tamil Nadu.

== Traditional sports ==
=== Silambam ===
Silambam is a weapon-based Indian martial art originating in Tamil Nadu that incorporates both offensive and defensive techniques. Though many weapons are used, the main focus is the bamboo staff. It has existed since the Sangam Literature Era. It is the oldest martial arts practice from South India. The World Silambam Association is the official international body for the sport.

=== Kabaddi ===
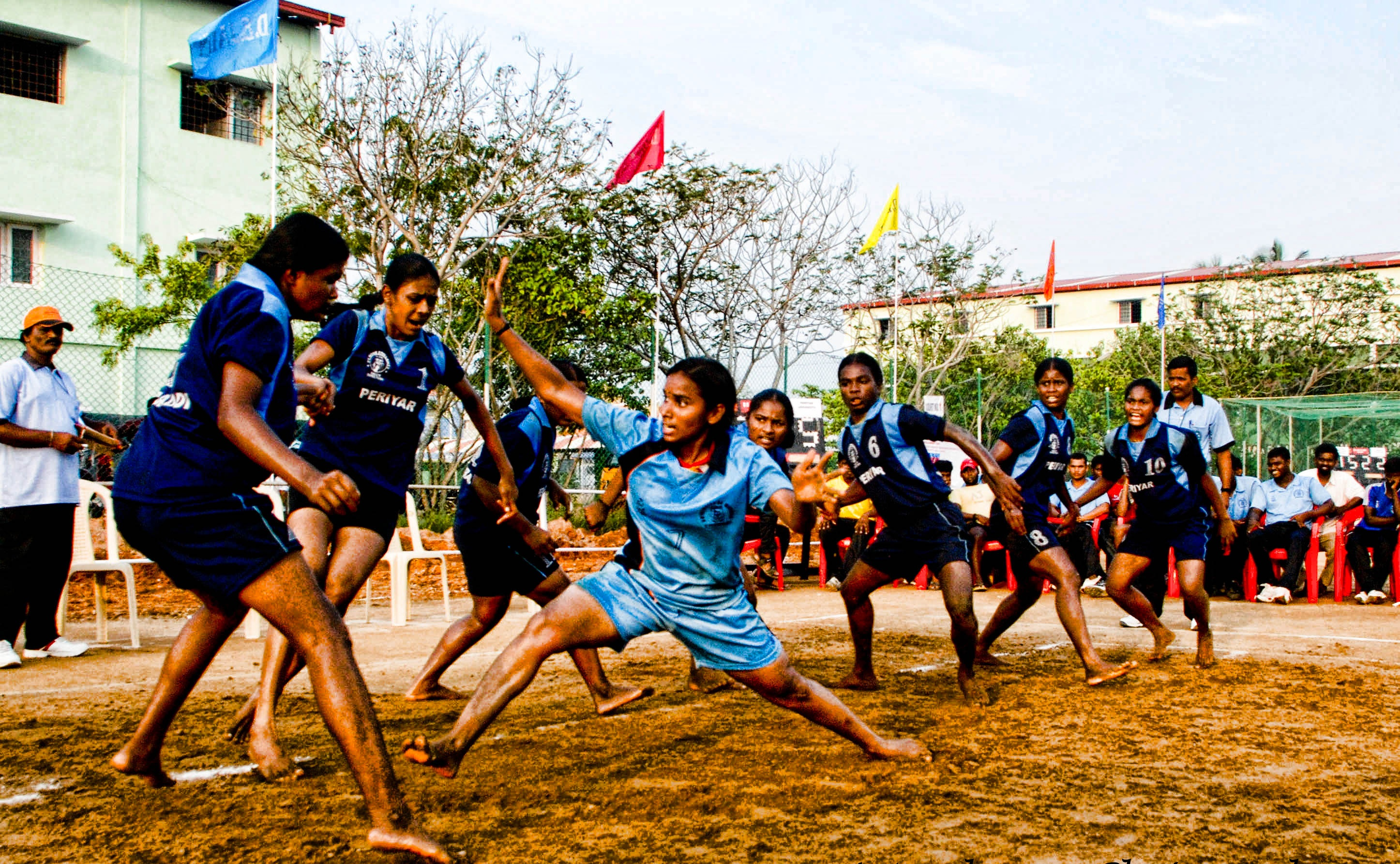
Women playing Kabaddi in Tamil Nadu

Kabaddi is the state sport of Tamil Nadu. The word "kabaddi" is derived from the Tamil word "kai-pudi"(கைபிடி) meaning "to hold hands". It is also known as sadu-gudu. The contact sport's origins can be traced back to about 4000 years ago during the Mahabharata period. Buddhist literature has also cited the Buddha playing kabaddi as a recreational sport. Kabaddi is also played as a warmup prior to the traditional sport Jallikattu.

It is known by different names in different places such as in the Maldives where it is known as "baibalaa", Punjab where is it called "kauddi", and Bengal where it is called "hadudu". Some other states like Punjab, Andhra Pradesh, and Telangana also recognize kabaddi as their state sport.

The essence of this game is for the defending team to hold onto the raiding team in their pitch. Though there are slight variations in the game played in different places, the basic rules are the same. India introduced this sport on a world platform during the 1936 Olympics in Berlin. It was popularized in Bangladesh in 1973, Japan in 1979 and Iran in 1996. It is the National Sport of Bangladesh and one of the national sports of Nepal.

Kabaddi is often called the 'game of the masses' as it holds a lot of public appeal due to its simplicity. India has won all of the international kabaddi tournaments including seven World Cup titles and numerous Asian Games gold medals.

Kabaddi requires open ground, multiple players, and the repeated muttering of 'kabaddi, kabaddi' as they maneuver through the opponent's team. Tamil Nadu has produced players who have been part of the winning national team.

=== Seval Sandai ===
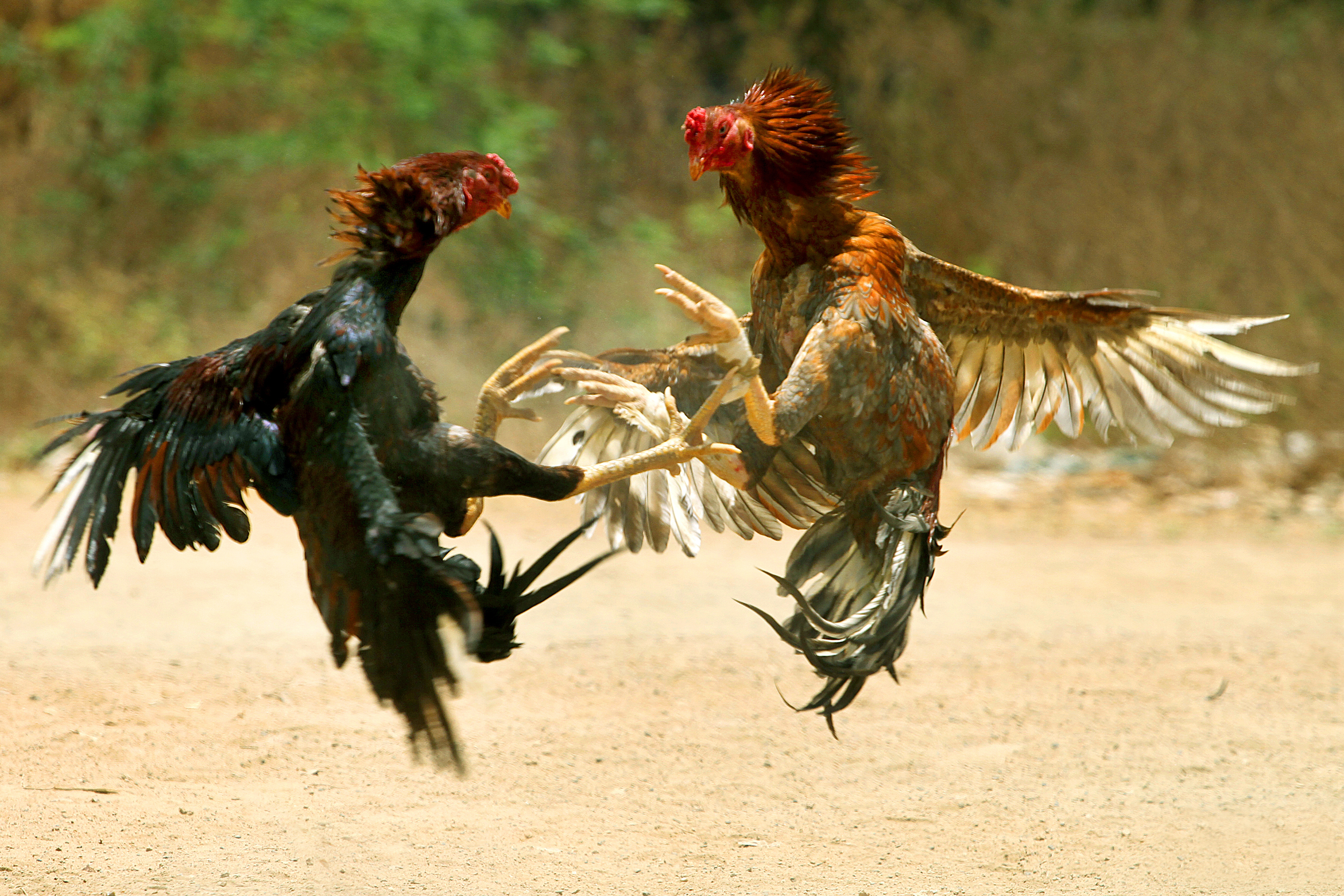
Seval sandai, traditional cock fight in Tamil Nadu

Seval Sandai or Seval Porr (cockfighting) is a popular rural sport in Tamil Nadu. Three or four-inch blades are attached to the cocks' feet, and the winner is decided after three or four rounds of no holds barred fighting. The sport involves major gambling in recent times. Cockfighting in Tamil Nadu is mentioned in ancient literature like Manu Needhi Sastiram, Kattu Seval Sastiram and other Sangam literature. It is referred to as the favorite pastime for the warriors of Tamil country and is acknowledged as one amongst the 64 great arts. It is now widely played in North America and Asia.

=== Jallikattu ===
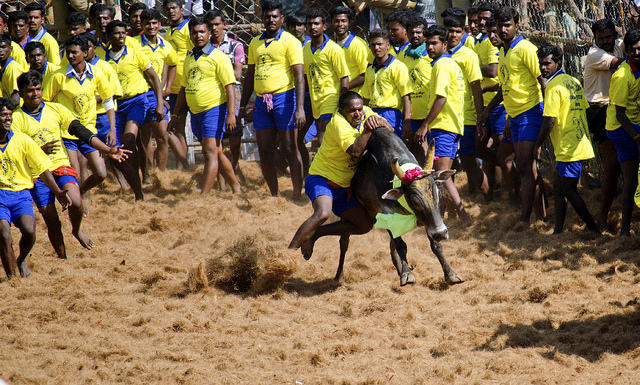
Jallikattu, taming the bull

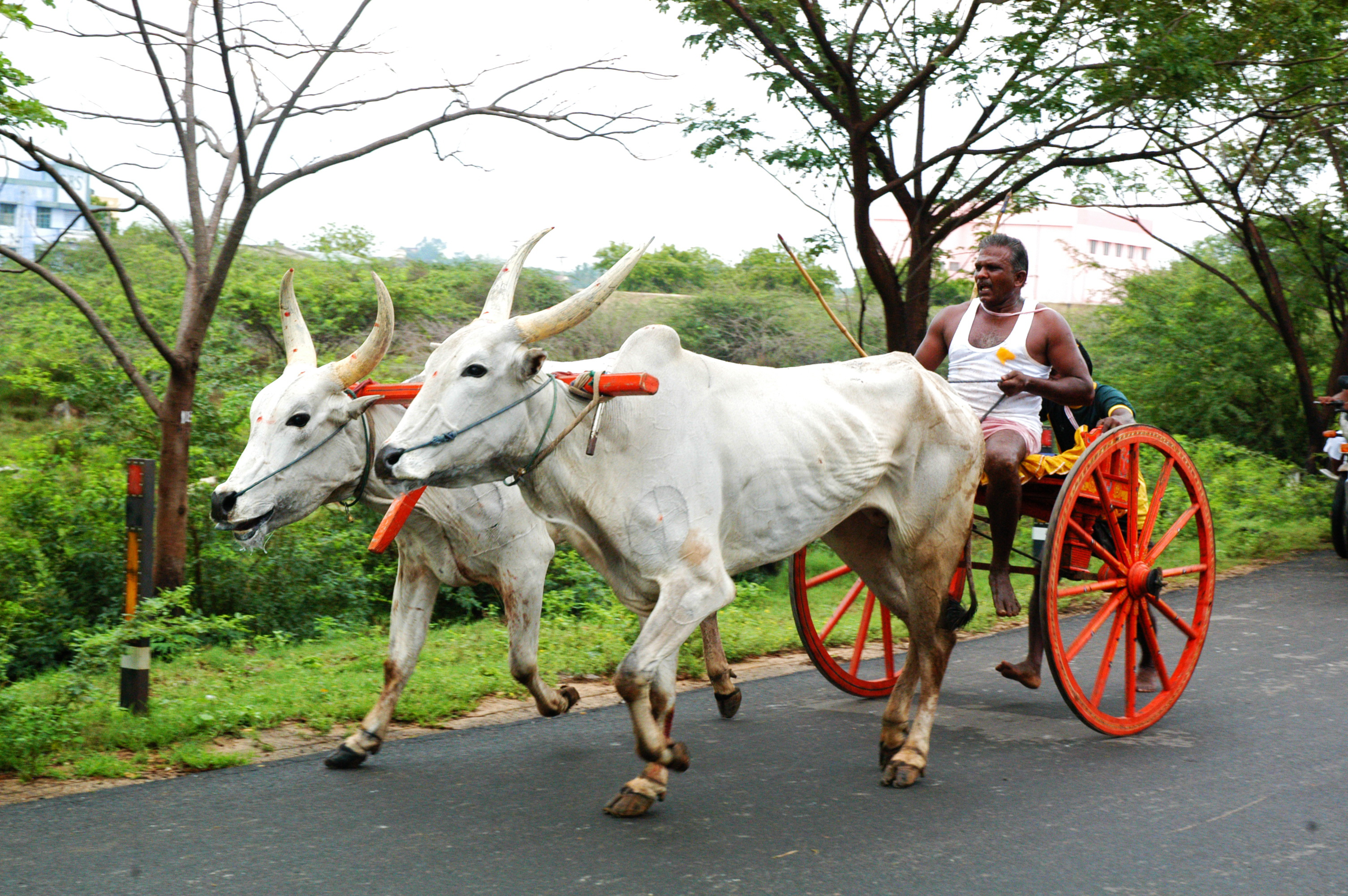
Rekla, bullock cart race

Jallikattu is a popular bull taming sport practiced particularly during the festival of Pongal. Jallikattu was a popular sport since the Sangam period and Tamil classical period. Also known as eru thazhuvuthal and manju virattu, it involves a bull, such as the Pulikulam or Kangayam breeds, that is released into a crowd of people, and participants attempt to grab the large hump on the bull's back with both arms and hang on to it while the bull attempts to escape. Participants must hold the hump for as long as possible, attempting to bring the bull to a stop. In some cases, participants must ride long enough to remove flags on the bull's horns.

=== Rekla ===
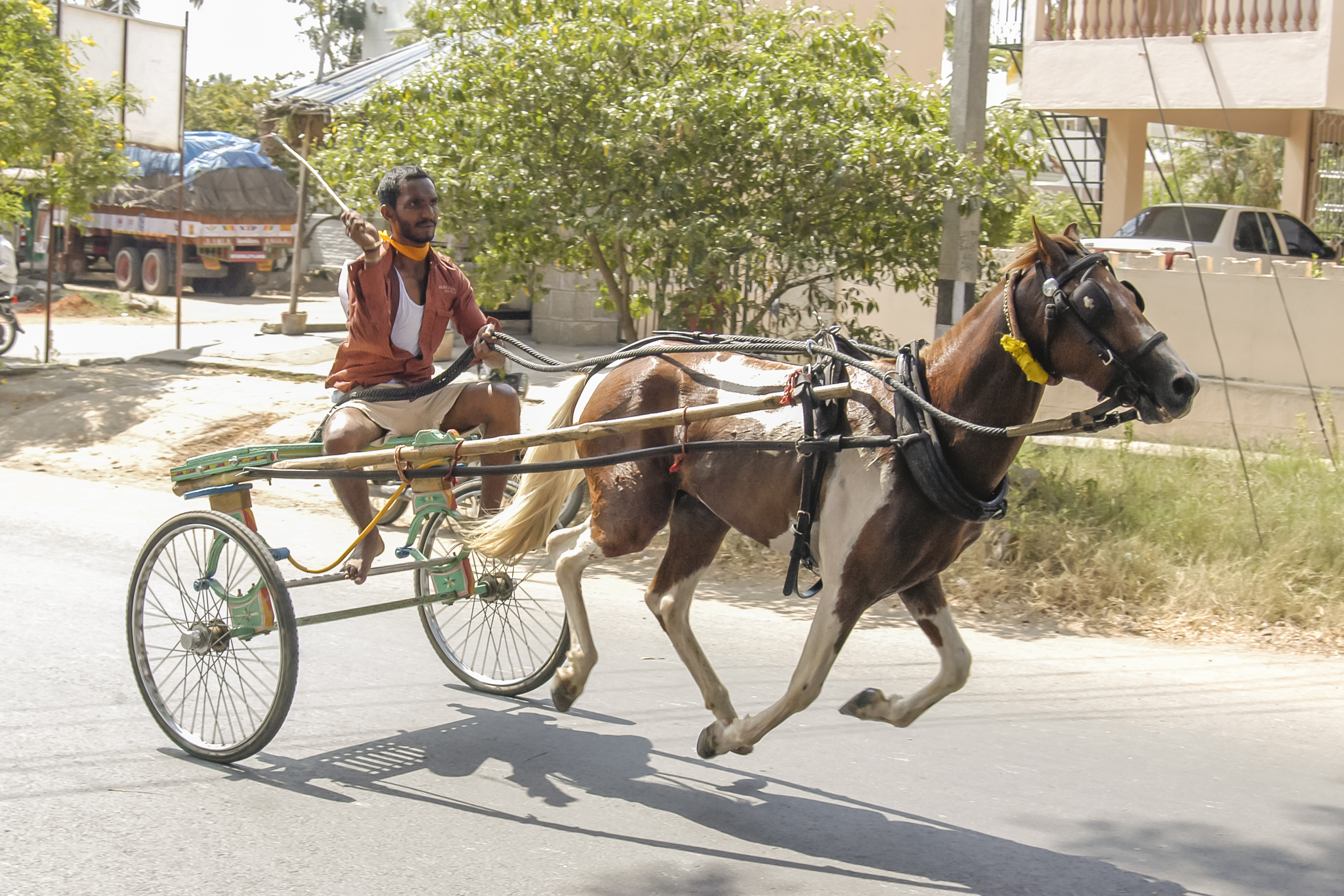
Rekla Racer in Namakkal, Tamil Nadu

The sport Rekla is a form of bullock cart racing.

=== Sathurangam ===
Chess is believed to have originated in India, c. 280 – 550 CE, where its early form in Tamil Nadu was known as Sathurangam literally four divisions [of the military] – infantry, cavalry, elephants, and chariots, represented by the pieces that would evolve into the modern pawn, knight, bishop, and rook, respectively. During the Sangam period chess was called Vallattam. Many chess pieces have been found during excavations in Tamil Nadu. Modern day chess is a widely popular game in the state and Tamil Nadu State Chess Association is the apex body for chess in Tamil Nadu. The state has produced many grandmasters including Viswanathan Anand, one of the greatest and most versatile players of the modern era having won the World Chess Championship five times from 2002 to 2013. Other notable players include R Praggnanandhaa, Gukesh D, S. Vijayalakshmi, P. V. Nandhidhaa, Aravindh Chithambaram, R Vaishali and Krishnan Sasikiran.

=== Malyutham ===
Malyutham is a traditional Indian martial art of full contact grappling that originated in Tamil Nadu. It was widely practiced in Tamil Nadu since ancient times as a sport. Malyutham is one of the 64 Arts mentioned in Ancient Literature. There is another art named Malla - Yuddha coming from North India. Although the names are similar, Malla-Yuddha and Malyutham are two different and very distinct arts. They are different in the nature of the techniques studied and in their external aspects as well.

=== Gusthi ===
Gusthi is a traditional sport, which has been historically practiced in Punjab. Gusthi is also known as Kai Kuthu Sandai. Gusthi is a form of traditional boxing, which is slightly deviated from wrestling. Gusthi of Tamil Nadu is a derivative of Malyutham of Tamil Nadu. Gusthi also includes grapplings as well. There is another art coming from North India named Kushti. Although the names are almost same, Gusthi and Kushti are two different and two distinct arts. Gusthi is an art of boxing, while kusthi is an art of wrestling. They are different in the nature of the techniques studied and in their external aspects as well.

=== Killithattu ===
Killithattu is a game that requires quick reflexes, tactical thinking and team effort. The sport is part of Tamil heritage and preserves Tamil identity. The 'kili' or last player must stand on the centre of the first lane when the game starts. The 'kili' player can move anywhere around the court or through the middle of the court but not horizontally. The team that is guarding the base and capturing it is chosen by a coin toss. The game is started by a whistle sound by the overseeing referee. When the game starts, each of the other members can only move sideways/horizontally. This accounts for the rest of the 5 members of the team for a total of 6 including the 'kili'.

=== Kho-kho ===
Kho kho is a tag sport played by teams of twelve players who try to avoid being touched by members of the opposing team, only 9 players of the team enter the field. It is one of the two most popular traditional tag games played in schools, the other being kabbadi.

=== Uriyadi ===
Uriyadi involves smashing a small earthen pot with a long stick usually with a cloth wrapped around the eyes to prevent the participants from seeing the pot.

=== Seven-Stones ===
Seven stones is a traditional game in India as well as in Tamil Nadu. It is an ancient game which is also called as Lagori. It has features similar to dodgeball but it has more aspects than dodgeball. It uses seven stones that can be piled on top of each other and has a minimum of 2-6 players in a team.

=== Other traditional sports ===
Other minor sports include Ilavatta kal where participants lift large spherical rocks, Gilli-danda played with two pieces of sticks, Nondi played by folding one leg and hopping squares. Some of the indoor games include Pallanguzhi involving beads, Bambaram involving spinning of top, Dhayakattai which is a modified dice game, Aadu puli attam, Nungu vandi and Seechangal.

== Modern sports ==
=== Cricket ===
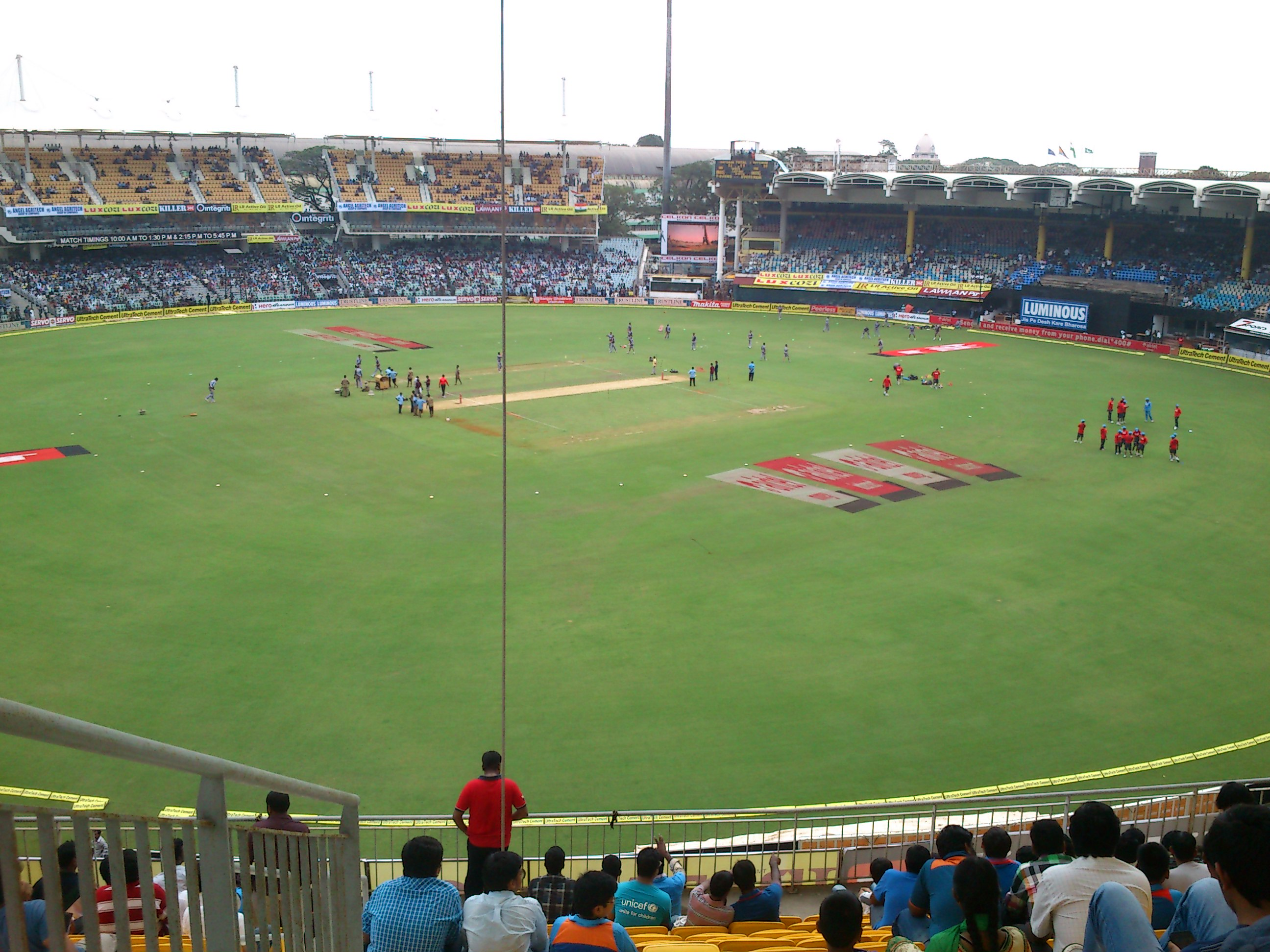
M. A. Chidambaram Stadium during an ODI match between India and Pakistan.

Cricket is the most popular sport in India. It is played by many people in open spaces throughout the state. Tamil Nadu Cricket Association is the governing body of cricket activities in the Tamil Nadu state of India and the Tamil Nadu cricket team, which has won the Ranji Trophy twice and has finished as runners-up 9 times. Chennai Super Kings, an Indian Premier League franchise based out of Chennai is the joint-most successful team in the competition. Notable international cricketers from Tamil Nadu include Srinivas Venkataraghavan, Kris Srikkanth, Laxman Sivaramakrishnan, Robin Singh, Murali Vijay, Ravichandran Ashwin, Dinesh Karthik, Sadagoppan Ramesh, Vijay Shankar, Washington Sundar, T. Natarajan, Murali Karthik, Subramaniam Badrinath and Lakshmipathy Balaji. Cricket administrators from the state include former International Cricket Council chairman N. Srinivasan, former BCCI presidents A. C. Muthiah and his father M. A. Chidambaram.

The M. A. Chidambaram Stadium in Chennai is one of the oldest cricketing venues and was the location of India's first test cricket victory. MRF Pace Foundation, a coaching clinic for training fast bowlers from all over the world is based in Chennai. It was created by MRF Limited with the help of former Australian pace spearhead Dennis Lillee.

=== Hockey ===
Hockey is one of the popular sports played in schools and colleges. Mayor Radhakrishnan Stadium is a field hockey stadium at Chennai named after M. Radhakrishna Pillai and was the venue for the 1996 Men's Champions Trophy as well as the 2005 tournament. It is also the venue for all division matches of the Chennai Hockey Association and the home ground of the World Series Hockey team Chennai Cheetahs. The Sports Development Authority of Tamil Nadu is planning to set up a hockey academy. Notable international players include Vasudevan Baskaran, Krishnamurthy Perumal, M. J. Gopalan, Dhanraj Pillay, Adam Sinclair and Mohammed Riaz.

=== Tennis ===
Chennai Open was an ATP World Tour 250 series tournament that used to be held annually in January at SDAT Tennis Stadium in Chennai. It was the only ATP tournament held in the country until 2017, after which the tournament moved to Pune. Notable players are Ramesh Krishnan, Ramanathan Krishnan, Vijay Amritraj, Mahesh Bhupathi, Ramkumar Ramanathan, Prajnesh Gunneswaran, Jeevan Nedunchezhiyan, Vijay Sundar Prashanth, N.Sriram Balaji and Nirupama Vaidyanathan.

=== Motor racing ===
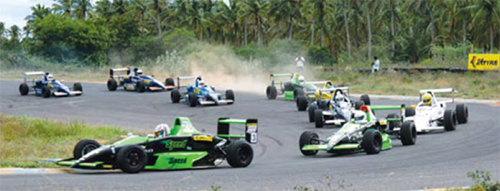
Kari Motor Speedway

Coimbatore is often referred to as the "Motor Sports Capital of India" and the "Backyard of Indian Motorsports". S.Karivardhan, spearheaded motor racing, making Coimbatore the country's motor racing hub when he designed and built entry level race cars. Before the Buddh International Circuit was constructed, the country's only two permanent race ways were the Kari Motor Speedway, Coimbatore and the Madras Motor Racing Track, Chennai. MRF built its first Formula 3 car in 1997. MRF in collaboration with Maruti established the Formula Maruti racing, a single-seater, open wheel class motorsport racing event for race cars made in India. MRF Challenge is a Formula 2000 open-wheel motorsport formula-based series organized by Madras Motor Sports Club in association with MRF. Narain Karthikeyan and Karun Chandhok, the only drivers from to represent India in Formula 1 hail from the state. Other prominent racers include Parthiva Sureshwaren, Ashwin Sundar, N. Leelakrishnan, Raj Bharath and Ajith Kumar.

=== Others ===
Other popular sports include athletics, Football, basketball, volleyball, softball and badminton. Jawaharlal Nehru Stadium, Chennai and Nehru Stadium, Coimbatore are popular multipurpose football and athletics stadiums in the state. Notable volleyball players include A. Palaniswamy, G. E. Sridharan. Tamil Nadu men's team won Gold in the national level competition held in 2011. Joshna Chinappa and Dipika Pallikal are the notable squash players who won gold at the Commonwealth Games. Kutraleeswaran is a notable swimmer, who was the first Indian to cross six channels in a single calendar year. Archery, boxing, carrom, shooting, weightlifting, martial arts, snooker, golf, bowling, and squash also feature among sports played. Srither won gold at Asian Archery Championship held at Indonesia in November 2009. A. Maria Irudayam and Ilavzhagi have won world carrom championships. Santhi Soundarajan is the first Tamil woman to win a medal at Asian Games. Sathish Sivalingam is a commonwealth gold medalist in weightlifting. Mariyappan Thangavelu has won the gold medal in the finals of 2016 Summer Paralympic games held in Rio de Janeiro.

== See also ==
- Tamil Nadu Cricket Association
- List of Tamil recipients of the Arjuna Award
- List of sportspeople from Tamil Nadu
- Sport in India
- Sport in Chennai
- Indian martial arts
