= List of sportspeople from Tamil Nadu =

List of sportspeople from the state of Tamil Nadu

The following is the list of International Sports Persons from the Indian State of Tamil Nadu:

== 2016 Summer Olympics - Rio 2016 ==
- Satish Sivalingam - Weightlifting,
- Arokia Rajiv - 4 × 400 m Relay,
- Ayyasamy Dharun - 4 × 400 m Relay,
- Sharath Kamal - Table Tennis,
- Krishnan Ganapathi - 20 km Walk,
- Mohan Kumar - Track and Field

== 2016 Summer Paralympics - Rio 2016 ==
Medal	Name	Sport	Event	Date
(gold) Gold	Mariyappan Thangavelu	Athletics	Men's High Jump	9 September

== Athletics ==
- Rajasekaran Pichaya
- Santhi Soundarajan
- Kumaravel Premkumar
- Nikhil Chittarasu

== Table Tennis ==
- Sathiyan Gnanasekaran
- Sharath Kamal

Achanta Sharath Kamal (born 12 July 1982) is a professional Table Tennis player from Tamil Nadu, India. Sathiyan Gnanasekaran is the highest ever ranked Indian in the world.

=== International Achievements ===
Medal	Sport	Event	Date
Gold	Table Tennis - Men's Singles	2006 Commonwealth Games - Melbourne	26 March
Gold	Table Tennis - Men's Team	2006 Commonwealth Games - Melbourne	27 March
Gold	Table Tennis - Men's Doubles	2010 Commonwealth Games - Delhi	13 October
Bronze	Table Tennis - Men's Team	2010 Commonwealth Games - Delhi	9 October
Bronze	Table Tennis - Men's Team	2018 Commonwealth Games - Gold Coast	9 April
Silver	Table Tennis - Men's Doubles	2018 Commonwealth Games - Gold Coast	14 April
Bronze	Table Tennis - Men's Singles	2018 Commonwealth Games - Gold Coast	15 April
Bronze	Table Tennis - Mixed Doubles	2018 Commonwealth Games - Gold Coast	15 April

== Tennis ==
All grand slam and highest singles ranking by an Indian are achieved by the players from Tamil Nadu. Ramanathan Krishnan reached semi finals of grand slam twice. His son Ramesh Krishnan reached grand slam quarters thrice and have beaten then World No 1 player Matts Wilander in the Australian open. Vijay Amritraj have reached quarter finals of grand slams fours times and have won 18 ATP singles career titles. Mahesh Bhupathi have won 12 grand slams titles for doubles and mixed doubles.

- Ramanathan Krishnan
- Ramesh Krishnan
- Vijay Amritraj
- Anand Amritraj
- Mahesh Bhupathi
- Prajnesh Gunneswaran
- Ramkumar Ramanathan
- Jeevan Nedunchezhiyan
- Vijay Sundar Prashanth
- N. Sriram Balaji
- Prakash Amritraj

== Chess ==
- Viswanathan Anand
- Gukesh D
- Pragganandha

== Carrom ==
- A. Maria Irudayam
- S. Ilavazhagi

== Hockey ==
- Vasudevan Baskaran

He captained the Indian team, which won the gold medal at the 1980 Summer Olympics in Moscow, Soviet Union.

Medal	Name	Sport	Event	Date
(gold) Gold	Vasudevan Baskaran	Field hockey	Field hockey at the 1980 Summer Olympics	29 July 1980

== Motor racing ==
- Narain Karthikeyan
- Sundaram Karivardhan
- Ajith Kumar
- Parthiva Sureshwaren
- Karun Chandhok

== Swimming ==
- Kutraleeswaran
- Niranjan

== Squash ==
- Joshna Chinappa
- Dipika Pallikal

=== International Achievements ===
Medal	Player name	Sport	Event	Date
Gold	Dipika Pallikal & Joshna Chinappa	Squash - Women's Doubles	2014 Commonwealth Games - Glasgow	2 August
Silver	Dipika Pallikal & Joshna Chinappa	Squash - Women's Doubles	2018 Commonwealth Games - Gold Coast	15 April
Silver	Dipika Pallikal & Saurav Ghosal(West Bengal)	Squash - Mixed Doubles	2018 Commonwealth Games - Gold Coast	14 April

== Skating ==
- Nethra

== Weightlifting ==
- Sathish Sivalingam

=== International Achievements ===
Commonwealth Games

Year	Venue	Event	Total	Result
2018	Gold Coast	77 kg	317	Gold
2014	Glasgow	77 kg	328	Gold

Commonwealth Championships

Year	Venue	Event	Total	Result
2017	Gold Coast	77 kg	320	Gold
2015	Glasgow	77 kg	325	Gold
2012	Tasmania	77 kg	297	Gold
