= Roshita Joseph =

Sri Lankan carrom player

Personal information
- Nationality: Sri Lankan
- Born: 29 May 1991 (age 35) Maradana, Colombo-10

Sport
- Country: Sri Lanka
- Sport: carrom
Medal record
Representing Sri Lanka
Women's carrom
Carrom World Cup
Silver medal – second place	2018 Chuncheon	team
Carrom World Championship
Gold medal – first place	2020 Online	singles
Silver medal – second place	2012 Colombo	team
Silver medal – second place	2016 Birmingham	team
Bronze medal – third place	2012 Colombo	doubles
Bronze medal – third place	2019 Pune	team

Roshita Joseph also spelt as Joseph Roshita (born 29 May 1991) is a Sri Lankan carrom player. She was also a former number 1 women’s carrom player in Sri Lanka and has won the national titles on six occasions. In 2020, she became a world champion in the women’s singles of the inaugural edition of the World Online Carrom Championship. She is currently attached to Sri Lankan Navy.

== Biography ==
She pursued carrom as a childhood hobby and she was attracted to carrom as her family had a carrom board. She was inspired to play carrom by both her parents and learnt the basic skills from them. She pursued her primary and secondary education at the All Saints’ Girls College in Borella. She also played netball, athletics and swimming at school level competitions. However, she stopped engaging in sports activities following her father’s death.

In 2020, she married fellow national carrom player Abishek Jayawardhana.

== Career ==
She later resumed her interest in the indoor game of carrom at her school when it was introduced in her school by her school principal in 2005. In the same year, she became runner-up in an U-19 school carrom championship at the age of 14. She was selected to the school carrom team in 2006. She was a key member of the school carrom team which won the 2006 Western Province Schools Carrom tournament. She was also part of school carrom team which became runners-up at the 2006 All Island Schools Championship. She won her first all-island title in 2007 during that year’s National Junior Carrom Championship. She was selected to the national team following her triumph at the 2007 National Junior Carrom Championship.

She won U-17 girls title as a schoolgirl at 2008 Skin Field International Carrom tournament which was held in India. She faced financial constraints prior to competing at the 2008 Skin Field Carrom tournament and her mother pawned her jewellery in order to finance er daughter’s tour. She captained the All Saints’ Convent carrom team which triumphed at the 2008 All Island School Carrom Championship. She won silver medal with the national team at the 2009 SAG Carrom Championship.

She won her first senior national title in women’s singles during the 2010 National Carrom Championship. She was crowned as the winner of both women’s singles and women’s doubles events at the 2010 Junior Carrom Championship. She could not defend her national title at the 2011 National Carrom Championship. She continued her dominance at national level by winning the women’s singles titles at the National Carrom Championships in 2012, 2014, 2015, 2016 and 2018. She was part of the Sri Lankan side which lost to India in the women's team final at the 2012 Carrom World Championship and she also teamed up Chalani Lakmali with to claim third place in women's doubles event in the same world championship.

She was a key member of the Sri Lankan team which claimed silver medal in women's team competition at the 2016 Carrom World Championship. She was named in the Sri Lankan women’s national carrom team for the 2018 Carrom World Cup. She was part of the Sri Lankan team which emerged as runners-up to India in the women's team competition of the 2018 Carrom World Cup. She finished at seventh place in the women's singles at the 2018 Carrom World Cup.

She was appointed as the captain of the Sri Lankan women’s team for the 8th Carrom ICF Cup 2019. Sri Lanka women’s team finished at third position in the team competition at the 2019 International Carrom Federation Cup. She won the women’s singles title at the 2020 World Online Carrom Championship which was organized by the UAE Carrom Federation. It was also her maiden carrom world title and became the third Sri Lankan to win a carrom world title after Nishantha Fernando and Chamil Cooray.
