= Punjab State Carrom Association =

- PSCA Logo
- Founded: 1997
- Location: Punjab, India
- Affiliations: All India Carrom Federation, International Carrom Federation

The Punjab State Carrom Association (PSCA) is the Punjab, India state sport federation for the indigenous game of carrom, and is a state affiliate of the All India Carrom Federation (AICF), India's national branch of the International Carrom Federation (ICF). The PSCA was formed during 1996–97 in Sirhind, Punjab, Northern India. There were ten district associations affiliated with PSCA of which the Tarn Taran and Amritsar associations are the largest. The PSCA's headquarters are in Mohali, Punjab. Till November 2022, The association has organized 5 State championships and 1 National championship.

== Officials ==
The PSCA has elected officers, including (as of 2018):

- President: Col. CS Bawa
- Executive President: Harjeet Singh
- Vice-president/Joint Secretary: Kamaljeet Grover
- Patron: Gurdeep Singh, Arvinderjit Singh
- General Secretary: Gurinder Singh (Mohali); also a Joint Secretary of the North Zone Carrom Association (NZCA), an officer of two of the district PSCA affiliates, and a well-known tournament player
- Treasurer: SK Viz

== Affiliated district associations ==
=== Amritsar District Carrom Association ===
ADCA affiliated with the PSCA on 14 February 2007. Because of the formation of new district called Tarn Taran, the officials of the ADCA shifted to the new Tarn Taran District Carrom Association, as the result of a meeting. ADCA was reformed subsequently, with new officers:

- Jaswant Singh – President
- Rajesh Thapa – General Secretary
- Simranjit Singh – Treasurer

=== Mohali District Carrom Association ===
The largest number of players in national tournaments to date were MDCA members. Officers include:

- Gurinder Singh – General Secretary (also General Secretary of PSCA, and officer of GTBSC)

MDCA players were champs at the state level and performed well in many nationals. It included Harpreet Singh, Amarpreet Singh Johal, Taranpreet Pahwa and Sukhpreet Kaur, among others.

=== Tarn Taran District Carrom Association ===
TTDCA(also Called TDCA) was formed in 2007 from ADCA, when Tarn Taran was declared as its own district that year, and the ADCA officers moved into the same positions in the TDCA. Its officials include:

- Balwinder Singh - General Secretary (also Vice-president of the PSCA)
- Rajinder Sharma - Committee Member
- Shanti Sharma - Committee Member

Longstanding TDCA player and coach Reeta Rani held 6th rank in the Youth National tournament held in at Alibag, Maharashtra. Other Notable players from TDCA includes Bholu Kapoor, Germanjeet Kaur, and Ramanpreet Kaur, among others.

=== Fatehgarh Sahib District Carrom Association (FSDCA) ===
FSDCA was formed in 1997. This association also conducted First Punjab State Carrom Championship. Notable players include Gurvinder Singh, Jatinder Pal Singh Batra, Harjatinder Singh, Vikrat Sharma.

=== Sangrur District Carrom Association (SDCA) ===
SDCA was formed in 2000. Heena Habib, Shahbaz Habib, Shamim Ahmed, Ammen Habib a.k.a. Payal Khan, Rubal Khan are notable players of the said association.

=== Patiala District Carrom Association (PDCA) ===
PDCA was made in year 2000. This association conducted seventh north zone carrom tournament. Harsimrat Singh is notable player of said association

=== Other associations ===
Following were other associations which remain inactive:

- Faridkot District Carrom Association (FDCA)
- Hoshiarpur District Carrom Association (HDCA)
- Jalandhar District Carrom Association (JDCA)
- Ropar District Carrom Association (RPCA)
- Bathinda District Carrom Association. President: Varinder Singh, Secratory: Sunil Kumar, Treasurar: Neeru Mittal

== Carrom Clubs under PSCA ==
=== Guru Tegh Bahadur Sports Club ===
The GTBSC was a Mohali District carrom club based at Mohali. This club was formed in 2006. This was first ever Carrom club in Mohali for said sport. The club was directly associated with the PSCA, rather than the Mohali District Carrom Association (MDCA), despite its location. The officers include:

- Mr. S.K. Viz - President
- Gurinder Singh (also General Secretary, PSCA and MHDC) - General Secretary and incoming President
- Mr. P. Singh Arora - Treasurer
- Mr. Sarabjit Singh - Committee Member

Carrom players of the GTBSC won top positions in state-level Carrom championships and performed well in several national tournaments. Apart from Carrom, the club was also active in table tennis, volleyball, and chess.

- This club is currently inactive.

== Work and achievements ==
- The PSCA had organised two open state championships, one with FSDCA at Sirhind in August 2000, and he other with ADCA at Khadoor Sahib in 2002. PSCA General Secretary Gurinder Singh played an important role in the tournaments as an organizer. The tournaments were successful and helped raise local public interest in carrom. PSCA Vice-president Balwinder Singh also played an important role as an organizer in the second state championship even though he was ill at the time.
- A senior national and inter state Carrom championship was organized jointly by the PSCA and the Chandigarh Carrom Association (CCA), at Jalandhar, Punjab, under the auspices of the AICF, on 2 September–7, 2000, with PSCA General Secretary Gurinder Singh acting as Deputy Championship Director. This was also a great success for the PSCA. Twenty-six states and thirteen institutions participated in the event. Krishnan K. Sharma (President, ICF), Sarabjit Singh (President, AICF), S.K. Sharma (General Secretary, AICF) and many others congratulated PSCA and CCA for jointly undertaking the prestigious event.
- The PSCA conducted the Seventh North Zone Carrom Championship, at Vir Hakikat Rai Public Cchool, Patiala from 26 January–28, 2007. Punjab champions Heena Habib and Sukhpreet Kaur were subsequently selected to participate in the All India Zonal Tournament.
- The PSCA has also helped with multi-sport tournaments featuring carrom, held in Punjab.

== Outstanding Players of PSCA ==
=== Men ===
==== Harpreet Singh ====
- Winner – Sub Junior - 1st Punjab state Carrom championship 2000.
- Stood 5th – Junior - 1st Punjab state Carrom championship 2000.
- Runner up – Junior – 2nd Punjab state Carrom championship 2002.
- Second Runner up – Senior – 2nd Punjab state Carrom championship 2002.
- Runner Up - Team Championship – 1st Punjab School State Carrom Championship.
- Winner – Individual Event - 1st Punjab School State Carrom Championship.
- Scholarship from NSI Patiala for winning in sub junior event in 1st Punjab state Carrom championship 2000.

==== Amarpreet Singh ====
- Second Runner Up – Sub Junior - 1st Punjab state Carrom championship 2000.
- Winner – Sub Junior – 2nd Punjab state Carrom championship 2002.
- Runner Up - Team Championship – 1st Punjab School State Carrom Championship.
- Second Runner Up – Individual Event - 1st Punjab School State Carrom Championship.
- Scholarship from NSI Patiala for winning in sub junior event in 2nd Punjab state Carrom championship 2002.

==== Shahbaz Habib ====
- Runner Up – Senior - 1st Punjab state Carrom championship 2000.
- Winner – Senior – 2nd Punjab state Carrom championship 2002.

==== Saurabh Sharma ====
- Winner – Junior – 1st Punjab state Carrom championship 2000.
- Winner – Senior – 1st Punjab state Carrom championship 2000.
- Left the PSCA and now playing from Haryana State Carrom Association.

==== Shamim Ahmed ====
- Second Runner up – senior – 1st Punjab state Carrom championship 2000.

==== Gurvinder Singh ====
- Runner up – Junior – 1st Punjab State Carrom Championship 2000
- Winner – Junior – 2nd Punjab state Carrom championship 2002.

=== Women ===
==== Heena Habib ====
- Runner Up – Senior - 1st Punjab state Carrom championship 2000.
- Winner – Senior – 2nd Punjab state Carrom championship 2002.
- Second Runner up in 1st north zone Carrom tournament.

==== Sukhpreet Kaur ====
- Winner – Sub Junior - 1st Punjab state Carrom championship 2000.
- Winner – Sub Junior – 2nd Punjab state Carrom championship 2002.
- Runner up – junior – 2nd Punjab state Carrom championship 2002.
- Runner up – Senior – 2nd Punjab state Carrom championship 2002.
- Winner – Individual Event - 1st Punjab School State Carrom Championship.
- 6th Rank in 1st North Zone carrom Championship
- 1st Scholarship from NSI Patiala for winning in sub junior event in 1st Punjab state Carrom championship 2000.
- 2nd Scholarship from NSI Patiala for winning in sub junior event in 2nd Punjab state Carrom championship 2002.

==== Bholu Kapoor ====
- Winner – Junior - 2nd Punjab state Carrom championship 2002.
- Scholarship from NSI Patiala for winning in junior event in 2nd Punjab state Carrom championship 2002.

==== Reeta Rani ====
- Second Runner up – Senior – 2nd Punjab state Carrom championship 2002.
- 6th in Youth National Championship at Alibagh.

==== Payal kha Aka Ammen ====
- Runner Up – Sub Junior – 1st Punjab state Carrom championship 2000.
- Runner Up – Sub Junior – 2nd Punjab state Carrom championship 2002.

==== Rubal Khan ====
- Second Runner Up – Senior - 1st Punjab state Carrom championship 2000.

==== Bhavneet Kaur ====
- Winner – Junior - 1st Punjab state Carrom championship 2000.
- Winner – Senior – 1st Punjab state Carrom championship 2000.

== See also ==
- All-India Carrom Federation
- Carrom
