= S. Ilavazhagi =

Indian carrom player (born 1984)

Personal information
- Nationality: Indian
- Born: 1984 (age 41–42) Vyasarpadi, North Chennai, India

Sport
- Country: India
- Sport: Carrom

S. Ilavazhagi also known as S. Ilavazhaki (born 1984) is an Indian who has twice won the carrom world cup. She is considered one of the finest carrom players to have represented India at international level from Tamil Nadu state after A. Maria Irudayam.

== Biography ==
S. Ilavazhagi was born in 1984 to a poor family at Vyasarpadi, Chennai. Her father A. Irudayaraj, a daily wage earning auto-rickshaw driver (motorished fish cart) and her mother, Selvi is a housewife. She is also the eldest of three sisters in her family.

== Career ==
Ilavazhagi is a member of the Thiruvallur District Carrom Association and also represented India at the Carrom World Championships, Asian Championships. She won the 2008 Indian National Carrom Championship which was held in Chennai beating a former world champion Rashmi Kumari in the final.

In the same year, she participated in the 2008 Carrom World Championships and became a world champion in the women's singles after beating P. Nirmala in the finals with 25–11, 25–11 victory. Ilavazhagi also defeated Rashmi Kumari in the semifinals to qualify for the final. Prior to the 2008 Carrom World Cup she got financial assistance from K. Vijayal, a retired Reserve Bank of India officer.

She also competed at the 2012 Carrom World Championships and emerged as runners-up to Rashmi Kumari in the women's singles final and also won the women's doubles title along with Rashmi Kumari.
