= AICF =

AICF may refer to:

- Acoustic Inertial Confinement Fusion, official term for bubble fusion
- All India Carrom Federation
- All India Chess Federation
- America Israel Cultural Foundation
- American Indian College Fund
- Angoulême International Comics Festival
