= Kajal Kumari =

Indian female carrom player (born 1999)

Personal information
- Nationality: Indian

Sport
- Country: India
- Sport: carrom
Medal record
Representing India
Women's carrom
Carrom World Cup
Gold medal – first place	2014 Male	team
Gold medal – first place	2018 Chuncheon	team
Bronze medal – third place	2014 Male	singles
Carrom World Championship
Gold medal – first place	2016 Birmingham	team
Gold medal – first place	2016 Birmingham	doubles

Kajal Kumari (born 1999) is an Indian female carrom player who represents India internationally and also works as an officer at the Indian Oil. During the 2018 Carrom World Cup, she created history by becoming the first ever woman to clinch the overall combined Swiss League title after defeating defending Swiss League champion Chamil Cooray of Sri Lanka in the combined Swiss League final.

== Career ==
She started playing carrom in 2005 and also went onto compete in state level carrom championships. Kajal Kumari later emerged as one of the finest carrom players in the state level competitions and went onto represent India at Carrom World Championships and in the Carrom World Cup tournaments.

Kajal was part of the Indian women's carrom squad which won the 2014 Carrom World Cup title defeating Sri Lanka in the final. She also secured bronze medal in the women's singles at the 2014 World Cup with gold medal eventually secured by fellow Indian Rashmi Kumari. She became champion at the 2015 ICF Cup defeating fellow Indian Tuba Sehar in the final. Kajal Kumari was also one of the key members of the Indian team which won the 2016 Carrom World Championship beating India in the final and also won the women's doubles with S Apoorva.

She also played a pivotal role in India's defense at the 2018 Carrom World Cup where India thrashed Sri Lanka 3–0 in the final.
