= Prashant More =

Indian carrom player

Personal information
- Nationality: Indian

Sport
- Country: India
- Sport: carrom
Medal record
Representing India
Men's carrom
Carrom World Cup
Gold medal – first place	2018 Chuncheon	singles
Silver medal – second place	2018 Chuncheon	team
Carrom World Championship
Gold medal – first place	2016 Birmingham	singles
Silver medal – second place	2016 Birmingham	team

Prashant More is an Indian carrom player. He is a two time carrom world champion in 2016 and 2018.

== Career ==
Prashant won his first world title in men's singles at the 2016 Carrom World Championship. He was also a member of the Indian team which emerged as runners-up to Sri Lanka in the men's tournament at the 2016 World Championships.

He defended his men's singles world title at the 2018 Carrom World Cup which was also his second individual World title. He was part of the Indian squad which lost to Sri Lanka in the finals of the 2018 Carrom World Cup.

He became runners-up to fellow Indian Irshad Ahmed Ansari in the men's singles final of the 8th Carrom ICF Cup 2019 despite having an early advantage in the final. He won the first set comfortably in the final 25-3 before going down 14-25 and 24-25 in the next two sets to his opponent. He was also a key member of the Indian team which won the world title in the men's tournament after defeating Sri Lanka in the final of the 2019 Carrom Mini World Cup.

In 2020, he also took part in an online carrom exhibition event conducted by the All India Carrom Federation via Facebook Live during the time when India was under lockdown due to the COVID-19 pandemic.
