= Irshad Ahmed Ansari =

Indian carrom player

Personal information
- Nationality: Indian

Sport
- Country: India
- Sport: carrom
Medal record
Representing India
Men's carrom
Carrom Mini World Cup
Gold medal – first place	2019 Pune	singles
Gold medal – first place	2019 Pune	team

Irshad Ahmed Ansari is an Indian carrom player.

== Career ==
Ansari won his first world title in men's singles after defeating fellow Indian Prashant More in the men's singles final of the 8th Carrom ICF Cup 2019. He lost the first set without a fight in the final 3–25 before coming back strongly to defeat More 25-14 and 25–24 in the next two sets. He was also a key member of the Indian team which won the world title in the men's tournament after defeating Sri Lanka in the final of the 2019 Carrom Mini World Cup.

In June 2020, he became an auto-rickshaw driver in order to cope up with the impact of the COVID-19 pandemic. Few carrom players such as Prashant More offered him financial assistance during the COVID-19 pandemic.
