= Pakistan Carrom Federation =

The Pakistan Carrom Federation (PCF) was incepted in Karachi, Pakistan by some long time Carrom lovers. The federation received an official approval of International Carrom Federation (ICF). Pakistan Carrom Federation is run by an organizing committee approved by the International Carrom Federation. The Constitution of the Federation has also been formulated on international sporting constitutional standards and approved by the International Carrom Federation. The main federation is working for the promotion of the game of Carrom in Pakistan since its inception.

Pakistan Carrom Federation
Founded	2004
Headquarter	Karachi
Chairman	Muhammad Aslam
Secretary General	Murtaza Khan Zulfee

== Executive committee ==
The structure of the Executive Committee is as following:

- Chairman – Muhammad Aslam
- Secretary General – Murtaza Khan Zulfee
- Joint Secretary – Khalid Rehman
- President – Sakhawat Ali
- Vice President – Estasham Saeed Qureshi
- Vice President – Aslam Pervez
- Vice President – Ismail Hassan
- Vice President – Muhammad Faisal Shaikh
- Treasurer – Ramzan Ali
- Director Media (Hon) Saad Bin Murtaza

== Activities ==
The federation has established Carrom clubs in different cities of Pakistan especially in Karachi and Quetta. A consortium of existing Carrom clubs was also formed to introduce international standards to replace the self-formed rules at each club. The federation in its ongoing campaign has been familiarizing international laws in of Carrom in different clubs of Pakistan.

PCF also distributed copies of International Carrom Laws translated and composed in Urdu language by the Secretary General of the Federation, Murtaza Khan Zulfee. These booklets are offered free of charge at the official PCF Club in Karachi. Tournaments arranged at different levels include college, zone, district, provincial and national level.
