= R. Arokiaraj =

Indian Carrom player

R. Arokiaraj is a Carrom champion from Chennai, Tamil Nadu, India. Arokiaraj was a city carrom champion.

He has won many international and national Carrom competitions.

== International Championships ==
- Champion, Doubles title with A. Maria Irudayam, First World Carrom Championship (1991) at New Delhi, India.
- Runner-up, Singles title, First World Carrom Championship (1991) at New Delhi, India.
- Member of the Indian team that won the Team Event at the First World Carrom Championship (1991) at New Delhi, India.
- Champion, Singles title, First International Triangular Invitation Carrom Tournament (1991) at Male, Maldives.
- Runner-up, Singles title, Second World Carrom Championship (1995) at Colombo, Sri Lanka.
- Runner-up, Doubles title with A. Maria Irudayam, Second World Carrom Championship (1995) at Colombo, Sri Lanka.
- Member of the Indian team that won the Team Event at the Second World Carrom Championship (1995) at Colombo, Sri Lanka.
- Champion, Singles title, First Malaysian Open International Carrom Tournament (1999) at Kuala Lumpur, Malaysia.
- Member of the Indian team that won the Team Event at the First Malaysian Open International Carrom Tournament (1999) at Kuala Lumpur, Malaysia.
- Champion, Mixed Doubles with G. Revathay, fourth SAARC Carrom Championship (2000) at Male, Maldives.
- Runner-up, Singles title, fourth SAARC Carrom Championship (2000) at Male, Maldives.
- Member of the Indian team that won the Team Event at the Fourth SAARC Carrom Championship (2000) at Male, Maldives.
