= 2016 Carrom World Championship =

Tournament information
- Dates: 7 November 2016–11 November 2016
- Administrator: International Carrom Federation
- Tournament format: Knockout
- Host: United Kingdom
- Venue(s): Badshah Palace, Clifton House, Walsall Road, Birmingham, United Kingdom
- Participants: 15
- Website: http://worldchampionship.ukcarromfed.com/

The 2016 Carrom World Championship, was the 7th edition of an international Carrom tournament governed by the International Carrom Federation, contested from 7 to 11 November 2016 in Birmingham, United Kingdom. Fifteen countries had competed in the tournament.

Indian and Sri Lankan players would be defending their titles in the Men's, Women's and Doubles categories.

This edition was considered to be the largest so far with over 15 countries participating in the elite event including the likes of USA, Germany, Canada, France and Italy.

== Participating teams ==
Each team can have a maximum of four men and four women, who can compete in the individual singles and doubles, apart from team event and Swiss league competition.

The entry fee for each player will be $250.

The host will take care of boarding, lodging and transport expenses of all the teams.

Total 15 countries participated in this event.

=== Men's ===
Team	Players
Canada	Anurag Chanda Derrick Silveira Louie Fernandes Shad Ahmed
Czech Republic	Jan Tesitel Zdenek Svitak Tomas Chmelar Ales Formanek
France	Pierre Dubois Fabian Pereira Benoit Lamy Jeremy Cieply
Germany	Peter Boecker Johannes Joerg Tobias Krueger Christian Russo
India	Sandeep Deorukhkar Prashant More Riaz Akbar Ali R. M. Shankara
Italy	Shriyantha Weerasinghe Nicolò Gallo Dineth Hapuarachchige Ayesh Vanderlan
Malaysia	Christopher Walter Mohd Suhaizan Mat Karri Mohd Azahar Zakaria S. Gopi
Maldives	Hussain Ali Ali Azim Mohamed Munthasir Ahmed Hamid
Pakistan	Murtaza Khan Zulfee Anus Bin Murtaza Muhammad Amil Ramzan Ali
Poland	Jakub Nowakowski Sylwester Pogorzelski Bartosz Sasinski Jakub Sasinski
South Korea	Dohhun Bae Soochang Kim Junoh Jung Eunseok Lee
Sri Lanka	Chamil Darshana Cooray Bulathsinghalage Nishantha Fernando Mohamed Sherifdeen Mohamed Halaldeen Mohamed Shaheed Mohomed Hilmy
Switzerland	Carlito Bollin Lorenzo Hurlimann Josef Meyer Anders Illi
United Kingdom	Mazharul Islam Munna Sunahar Ali Ish Kumar Aniket Shetye
United States	Vishal Karangutkar Neel Joshi Deep Joshi Murali Balasubramaniam

=== Women's ===
Team	Players
France	Ariane Garjah Athena Pantzos Clervie Le Corre Laetitia Pidial
Germany	Susanne Schackert Meike Weigel Rahim Kumala
India	Kajal Kumari S. Appoorwa M. Primala Devi Tuba Seher
Malaysia	Suzana Salim Jamilah Ibrahim Nor Zalina Mokhtar Roslina Mohd Nordin
Maldives	Aminath Vishama Aishath Fainaz Aminath Vidhaadh Aminath Suba
Poland	Paulina Nowakowska Magdalena Szczepaniak
Sri Lanka	Joseph Roshita Chalani Lakmali Liyanage Rahubaddha Kankanamalage Yasika Rahubaddha Senevirathna Yapage Arosha Koushali Wickramasinghe
United Kingdom	Tahmina Shawkat Ruhena Begum Sharmin Simpa
United States	Umamaheswari Munagala Sujatha Tella Saroj Deepika Kalahasthi

== Medals ==
Rank	Nation	Gold	Silver	Bronze	Total
1	India	5	5	2	12
2	Sri Lanka	1	1	2	4
3	Maldives	0	0	2	2
Totals (3 entries)		6	6	6	18

== Nations ==
1. United Kingdom (7) (Host)
2. United States (8)
3. Canada (4)
4. Switzerland (4)
5. Germany (7)
6. France (8)
7. Italy (4)
8. Poland (6)
9. South Korea (4)
10. India (8)
11. Sri Lanka (8)
12. Maldives (8)
13. Pakistan (4)
14. Malaysia (8)
15. Czech Republic (4)

== Results ==
=== Men's Singles ===
First Place: Prashant More India

Second Place: Riyaz Akbarali India

Third Place: Yogesh Pardesi India

Fourth Place: R.M. Shankara - India

Fifth PLACE : D.N. Fernando - Sri Lanka

Sixth Place : Louis Fernandes - Canada

Seventh Place : Chamil Cooray - Sri Lanka

Eighth Place : Sandeep Deoroukar - India

=== Men's Doubles ===
First Place: Sandeep Deorukhkar / Riyaz AkbarIndia

Second Place: R. M. Shankara / S.P. Aravinthan

=== Men's Team ===
First Place: Sri Lanka

Second Place: India

Third Place: Maldives

=== Women's Singles ===
First Place: S. Appoorwa India

Second Place: Parimala Devi India

Third Place: Rashmi Kumari India

=== Women's Doubles ===
First Place: Kajol Kumari and S. Appoorwa India

Second Place Parimala Devi and Tuba Sheher

=== Women's Team ===
First Place: India

Second Place: Sri Lanka

Third Place: Maldives
