= S. Apoorva =

Indian carrom player

Personal information
- Full name: Saikumar Apoorva/Saikumar Apporwa
- Nationality: Indian
- Born: 1981 (age 44–45) Hyderabad, Andhra Pradesh, India

Sport
- Country: India
- Sport: carrom
Medal record
Representing India
Women's carrom
Carrom World Cup
Gold medal – first place	2018 Chuncheon	singles
Gold medal – first place	2018 Chuncheon	team
Carrom World Championship
Gold medal – first place	2004 Colombo	singles
Gold medal – first place	2016 Birmingham	singles
Gold medal – first place	2016 Birmingham	doubles
Gold medal – first place	2016 Birmingham	team

Saikumar Apoorva (born 1981) also popularly known by her short name S. Apoorva also spelt as either S. Apoorwa or S. Appoorwa is an Indian carrom player and a defending carrom world champion in women's singles. She also currently works as a senior administrative officer in Life Insurance Corporation of India. She is also the first world champion in any sport to have emerged from the city of Hyderabad.

== Early life ==
She was born and raised in Hyderabad, Andhra Pradesh (now a part of it is called Telangana). Her ancestors hail from the state of Tamil Nadu. She took an interest in carrom as a child at the age of 10 after watching her father play the game with his friends. She pursued her career in the sport of carrom with her father's consultation.

== Career ==
She made her debut in 2003 at the International Carrom Federation Cup and won the women's singles title which was held in France. She won her maiden women's singles title at the 2004 Carrom World Championships which was held in Colombo.

S. Apoorva was also one of the key members of the Indian team which won the 2016 Carrom World Championship beating Sri Lanka in the final. She also won both women's singles and women's doubles with Kajal Kumari during the 2016 Carrom World Championship.

Appoorva was also part of the Indian team which thrashed Sri Lanka 3–0 in the final of the 2018 Carrom World Cup. In the 2018 Carrom World Cup, she also won the women's singles title defeating fellow Indian player Kajal Kumari in the final. She also emerged victorious in the women's singles at the 2019 Telangana State Ranking Tournament.
