= United States Carrom Association =

The US Carrom Association was formed in 1995 to promote the international sport of carrom in America. The goal of the USCA is to create a thriving carrom community in the US and to ensure US participation in the many international carrom tournaments and events organized by the International Carrom Federation or other National Carrom Associations around the world.

Current committee of USCA is:

- President: Bala Parthasarathy
- Vice President: Naveen Chandran
- Treasurer: Mandar Ashtekar
- Secretary: Mandar Ashtekar
- Technical Director: Nani Subbarao

== USCA past to present in a nutshell ==
- Founded by Billy Stevens in 1995.
- Organized international tournaments including a world cup in 1996, 2003, 2010 & 2015.
- Developed and donated carrom software to the carrom world in 2000. The software is widely used to conduct carrom tournaments all over the world.
- Adopted standard international carrom equipment in 2002.
- Re-Imagined carrom board design in 50 years and innovated GREEN carrom boards in 2015.
- Organized a US open international tournament exclusively played on Green Boards in 2015. Extended free invitation to players around the world.

== What USCA does ==
- Help organize tournaments and give people opportunity to play the game in a competitive match environment.
- Help recognize qualified players professionally and provide them with further opportunities in the international arena.
- Ensure tournaments are played with right formats & rules that are accepted internationally and recommended/practiced by ICF.
- Ensure necessary software & standard equipment is available for use in the tournaments.
- Help innovate carrom equipment to further game techniques, aesthetics and to improve digital coverage.
- Help provide information to players and people at large about the game & its activities through website and other communication channels.
- Help organize coaching through workshops at local level by partnering with local social organizations.
