= Bangladesh Carrom Federation =

National federation for carrom in Bangladesh

- Formation: 1990
- Headquarters: Dhaka, Bangladesh
- Region served: Bangladesh
- Official language: Bengali
- President: A.F.M Eheteshamul hoque (Tuhin)

Bangladesh Carrom Federation is the national federation for carrom and is responsible for governing the sport in Bangladesh.

== History ==
Bangladesh Carrom Federation was established in 1990. In 1998, Bangladesh Carrom Federation started receiving funding from the National Sports Council under the Ministry of Youth and Sports. It also received space for its headquarters at the government-owned Maulana Bhasani Hockey Stadium. It is a member of the Asian Carrom Confederation and International Carrom Federation.
