= Chamil Cooray =

Sri Lankan carrom player

Chamil Darshana Cooray Bulathsinghalage is a Sri Lankan carrom player. He has been playing for Sri Lanka from 2004 to date who was also the captain of the Sri Lanka Men's Carrom team that won the 2016 Carrom World Championship in Birmingham, England. He was also part of the Sri Lankan team in the 2012 Carrom World Championship where he finished 6th in the Men's Singles rankings

In the Swiss World League held during the 2016 Carrom World Cup, he won the title with 1000 points which was also his second Swiss League title after doing so in 2014. He thereby became the first Sri Lankan carrom player to win the Swiss World League title on two occasions, and the only player to win the title on two consecutive occasions, in 2014 and 2016.

Chamil Cooray along with Nishantha Fernando were placed third in the Men's Doubles held during the 2012 Carrom World Cup.

He was also part of the Sri Lankan carrom team which emerged as runners-up to India in the 2004 World Cup, where he finished in 5th place in Men’s Singles.

In the 2008 Carrom World Cup he along with Fernando were placed second for the Men's Doubles.

He is appointed as the captain of the Sri Lankan carrom contingent for the 2018 Carrom World Cup.

== See also ==
- List of Sri Lankan sportspeople
