= R. M. Shankara =

Indian Carrom player

Ramnagar Manikyam Shankara, best known as R. M. Shankara, is a two-time World Carrom Champion from Karnataka, India. He has been a several-time Indian national champion, beginning with this victory at Jalandhar in 2000.

== Achievements ==
- Winner : Karnataka State Carrom Championship 2000
- Winner : Senior National Championship 2000 (Jalandhar)
- Winner : World Championship 2000
- Winner : Malaysian Open International 2000
- Winner : 2nd U.S Open 2003
- Winner : International Carrom Federation Cup, Cannes 2003
- Winner : Senior National 2003 (Bangalore)
- Winner : SAARC Championship, Dhaka 2003
- Winner : Indo - Sri Lanka Test 2002 & 2004
- Runner Up: World Cup 2001, Lutton
