= A. Maria Irudayam =

Indian carrom player

Personal information
- Nationality: Indian
- Born: 1956 (age 69–70) Chennai, Tamil Nadu, India

Sport
- Country: India
- Sport: Carrom

Anthony Maria Irudayam (born 1956 in Chennai, India) is a two-time World Carrom Champion and nine-time national champion of India. He was awarded the prestigious Arjuna Award, a sporting honour presented by the Government of India, in 1996. As of 2007, he is the only person to have received the award for carrom. He is the current secretary of the Chennai District Carrom Association. He has rued over lack of sponsorship in carrom over the years.

== Career ==
After dropping out of school at the age of 14, he started playing carrom at the age of 17 representing local clubs. He won his first local carrom tournament in 1977. He was encouraged by his family and friends to play carrom against veterans.

Several times, he was member of the Indian team winning a team event in a tournament. This was the case with the International Carrom Federation Cup in 1989 and 1997, the World Carrom Championships in 1991, 1995 and 2000, the SAARC Carrom Championship between 1997 and 1999, the US Open International Carrom Tournament in 1996 as well as the French Open International Carrom Tournament in 1998.

In addition to this, Irudayam became champion (singles) at the World Carrom Championship in 1991 (where he also became doubles champion with R. Arokiaraj) and 1995, at the Champions Championship in 1998, at the French Open International Carrom Tournament in 1998 as well as at the SAARC Carrom Championship in 1998 (where he also became doubles champion with Jagan Bengle in 1999.

In 1995 Carrom World Cup which was held at Colombo, he won the men's singles title and he emerged as runners-up along with R. Arokiaraj to fellow Indian pair in the men's doubles final. Moreover, Irudayam made the top three in a lot of championships in the 1990s. In the 2000 Carrom World Cup, he finished at fourth position in the men's singles. He was later employed in the Railways. He currently runs and operates his own coaching club in Chennai.

He was announced as one of the judges by All-India Carrom Federation for the 2020 Online World Carrom Challenge.

== Personal life ==
In 2012, Irudayam's wife died after she was run over by a truck near Chennai.

== Legacy ==
Indian actor Dhanush partly played his role as a carrom player in the 2018 Tamil film Vada Chennai.

== Awards ==
- Best Student Sportsman Award by the Tamil Nadu Sports Journalist Association.
- Outstanding Sports Person of Tamil Nadu Award.
- Best International Sports and of his Community. (1996)
- Arjuna Award by the government of India. (1997)
- Best International Player Award by the German Carrom Federation. (1998)
