= Kutraleeshwaran =

Indian swimmer

- குற்றாலீஸ்வரன்
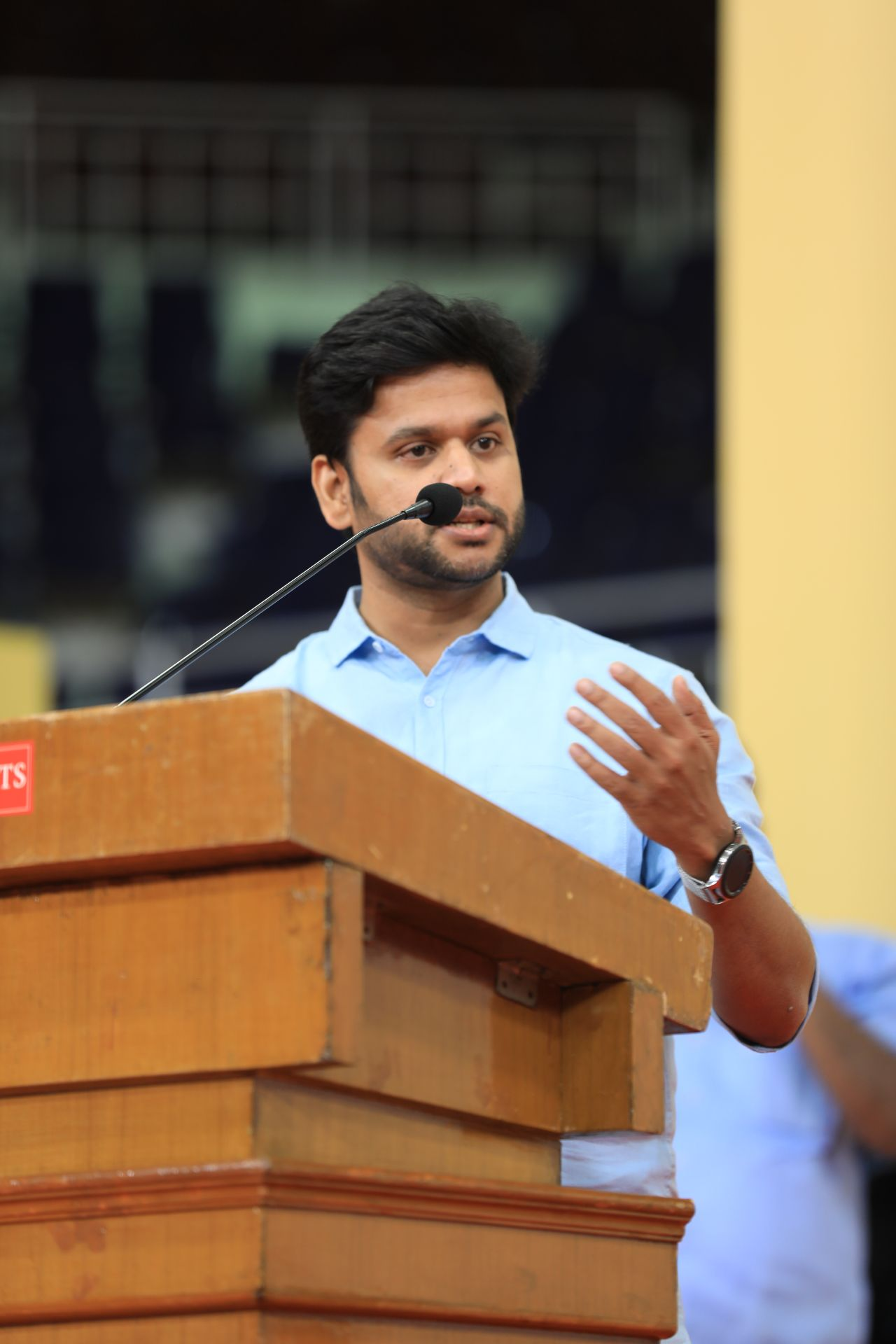
- Born: 8 November 1981 (age 44); Erode, Tamil Nadu, India
- Other names: Kutral
- Occupation(s): President and Managing Partner
- Organization: Heading venture capital arm of a multi asset investment fund
- Spouse: Brindha Ananthan
- Awards: Guinness World Record; Arjuna Award

Kutraleeshwaran Ramesh (born 8 November 1981), popularly known as Kutraleeshwaran or Kutral, is an Indian swimmer and the founder of Kutraleeshwaran Sports Foundation which aims to help Indian sportspersons who are suffering financially.

A winner of the prestigious Arjuna award for sportspersons from Indian government, he also entered the Guinness Book of World records when he was just 13 years old, by swimming across six channels in a single calendar year, a feat which was never achieved by anyone else till date.

Currently, he runs a foundation named Kutraleeshwaran Sports Foundation to help Indian sportspersons who are suffering financially to spend for their sporting activities.

== Personal life ==
Kutral was born in Erode, Tamil Nadu. He is the second born child to Ramesh, an advocate at the Madras High Court and his wife Sivakami, a homemaker. His family moved to Chennai when he was one month old. He married Brindha Ananthan.

== Swimming ==
He began to swim at the age of 4 to 5, when he was let to swim in a big well in his native village, aided by a dry bottle guard, which was used as a swimming ring. His enthusiasm and interest in swimming amazed his parents, who enrolled him for swimming classes during his summer vacation. Seeing Kutral learn all four strokes in around a week, his coach was impressed. He advised Kutral's parents to continue the coaching post the vacations, which his parents adhered to, seeding his swimming career much early in his life.

His first major participation in a swimming event was at the age of seven, in a district-level swimming contest known as the "Ribbon Meet" conducted in Chennai. It was called a ribbon meet, because the top six of the eight district-level finalists won ribbons as prizes. In that contest, he won sixth position and a ribbon. He took part in many district and state-level contests. At the age of ten (in 1991), he took part in 5 km swimming competition in the sea. Despite being the youngest participant, he placed fourth.

=== Crossing the Palk Strait ===
In 1994, his next swimming expedition was to surpass Mihir Sen's record of completing five channels in a calendar year, a record that was unbroken for over 30 years. He first swam across the Palk Strait (Ram Setu), which lies between Tamil Nadu, India and Sri Lanka in April 1994 at the age of 12.

=== Swimming across the English Channel ===
After completing Palk strait, he went on to cross the English Channel on 15 August 1994. Notably, 15 August is the Independence day of India and he started swimming at 6AM UK time on this day in UK and reached French shore on the same evening.

=== Four more channels to Guinness ===
He swam across the Rottnest Channel in Australia, the Straits of Messina at Italy, and the Zannone Circeo at Italy. Finally, he crossed the Ten Degree Channel on 30 December 1994. Thus, he swam across the six channels, all during the calendar year 1994, and his feat was included in the Guinness Book of World Records.

=== International competitions ===
After setting the stage and proving his mettle as a marathon swimmer by swimming across various straits, he started taking part in swimming competitions all over the world.

Between 1995 and 1998, he was the only participant from Asia of the 25 swimmers selected from across the world for the World Series in Swimming. He represented India in more than six competitions around the world and won medals for India, which includes a first prize in Switzerland.

== Financial support from the government ==
The Tamil Nadu State government sponsored and provided holistic support for his entire Guinness record contributing swims (1994). The Indian Government sponsored one of his International competitions (1995). Notably, he managed these feats in parallel with his elementary and higher secondary education.

== Arjuna Award ==
He was awarded the Arjuna Award by the Indian Government for bringing laurels to the country and for the Guinness record in 1996. Being recipient of this award at 14 years, he became (and is still) the youngest person to have received this award.

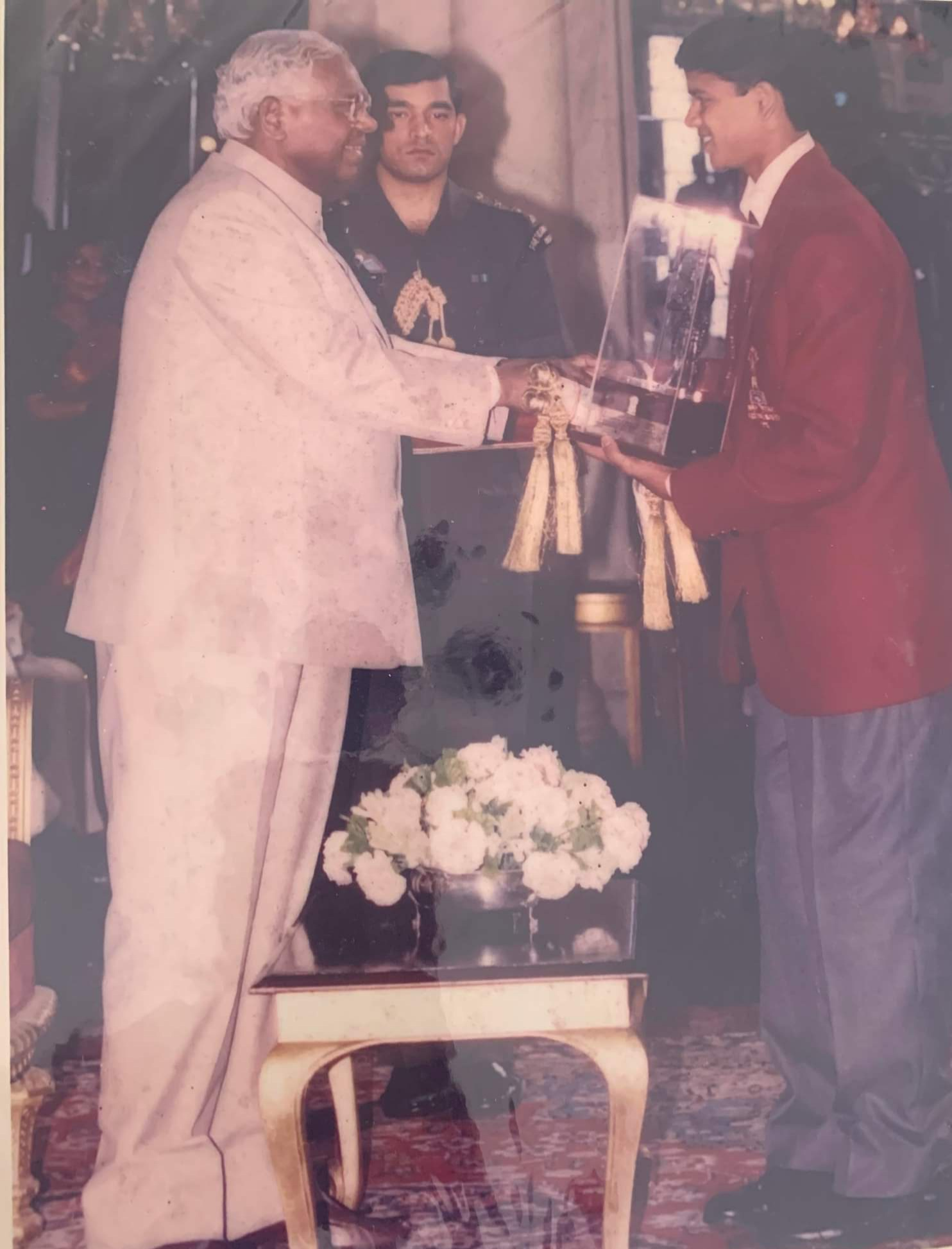
Kutraleeshwaran receiving Arjuna Award from the President of India

Among other recipients of the award in the same year was the famous cricketer Javagal Srinath.

== Early retirement from swimming ==
In the early and middle 1990s, when he was into full time swimming, private corporate sponsors for athletes were non-existent and managing the mounting expenses involved in participating in international events in individual capacity was challenging. Further, the situation in India for sportspersons (other than cricketers) was not as encouraging. It was very common to come across news on ex-athletes (including many champions) suffering in extreme poverty, doing daily wages for sustenance etc., which discouraged him to take up sports as the major career option. Therefore, he made a conscious decision to retire early from professional swimming in 1998 to take up education as his prime area of concentration.

== Education and career ==
Kutral did his schooling in DAV, Gopalapuram, Chennai. The school was supportive to him as he pursued his passion of swimming and conducted extra classes for him when he missed classes owing to his involvement in sports.

He obtained a bachelor's degree in engineering from the College of Engineering, Guindy. He then went on to pursue his masters MS (Microelectonics) from the University of Texas in Dallas, Texas, USA. He then took up a career with Intel as a design engineer, which he later resigned from.

He pursued MBA from IIM, Bangalore, which he again had to quit midway after around two months, as he was admitted for MBA from Sloan Institute of Management in Massachusetts, USA. He completed his MBA and moved in as an Investment Banker with Barclays and later switched to Citibank where he became Vice President, Corporate & Investment Bank. Despite his success, he left Citi abruptly to join the venture capital business at FlowCapital.

Currently, he lives in Texas, USA where he heads the Venture Capital arm of a multi asset investment fund.

== Sports foundation ==
Further, he launched a foundation named 'Kutraleeshwaran sports foundation' with the mission statement of "Establish sports as truly rewarding opportunity, for athletes, corporates, foundations, government, public and India". In his own words cited below, he expressed heartfelt ecstasy at establishing the foundation

"As a former athlete who had to give up sports owing to the lack of financial support, this small aspirational step towards changing the status quo, is extremely close to my heart."

The objective of the foundation is to provide financial support to aspiring sportspersons on one side and give some financial support to yesteryear sport champions from India who are needful of financial support. The ultimate objective is to encourage the number of people who take up sports as a career option, by providing them better assurance financially and better support morally.
