= International Carrom Federation =

Game governing body

- Founded: 15 October 1988
- Headquarters: Zürich, Switzerland / 17 Member Nations in May 2022
- President: Josef Meyer
- Website: www.icfcarrom.com

The International Carrom Federation (ICF) is the international governing body for the game of carrom. Such an organisation was first proposed in the 1950s, but the ICF was not formed until October 1988, when delegates from India, Sri Lanka, the Maldives, Malaysia, Germany and Switzerland met in Madras, India, for the first World Carrom Congress, at which the ICF was formed and an international set of rules was adopted.

== Management Board ==
The International Carrom Federation (ICF) is an association governed by Swiss law founded in 1988 in Chennai, India.

Currently the head office is based in Zurich, Switzerland.

- President: Josef Meyer Switzerland
- Secretary General: V.D. Narayan India
- Vice Presidents:
1. Elisa Martinelli Italy
2. Langley Mathiasz Sri Lanka
3. Mohammed Ali United Kingdom
4. Murtaza Khan Zulfi Pakistan
5. Mouraly Venou France
6. Dohun Bae South Korea
7. Zunaid Ahmed Palak Bangladesh
- Assistant Secretary:
1. Rohini Mathiasz Sri Lanka
2. Atul Behave United States
- Treasurer: Ashraf Ahmed Bangladesh

== Events ==
- World Carrom Championship
- Carrom World Cup
- ICF Cup

=== World Carrom Championship ===
- 1st World Carrom Championship 1991 - Official Results Here.
- 2nd World Carrom Championship 1995 - Official Results Here.
- 3rd World Carrom Championship 2000 - Official Results Here.
- 4th World Carrom Championship 2004 - Official Results Here.
- 5th World Carrom Championship 2008 - Official Results Here.
- 6th World Carrom Championship 2012 - Official Results Here.
- 7th World Carrom Championship 2016 - Official Results Here.
- 8th World Carrom Championship 2022 - Official Results Here.

=== Carrom World Cup ===
- 1st Carrom World Cup 2001 - Official results here.
- 2nd Carrom World Cup 2006 - Official results here.
- 3rd Carrom World Cup 2010 - Not held.
- 4th Carrom World Cup 2014 - Official results here.
- 5th Carrom World Cup 2018 - Official results here.

=== ICF Cup ===
- 1st ICF Cup 1989 - Official results here.
- 2nd ICF Cup 1993 - Official results here.
- 3rd ICF Cup 1998 - Official results here.
- 4th ICF Cup 2003 - Official results here.
- 5th ICF Cup 2008 - Official results here.
- 6th ICF Cup 2011 - Official results here.
- 7th ICF Cup 2015 - Official results here.
- 8th ICF Cup 2019 - Official results here.

== Members of ICF ==
=== Regions ===
As of November 2024, the Federation had 19 member associations. In addition, some continental confederations of national associations have been formed, including the Asian Carrom Confederation. The ICF has authorized the formation of continental confederations for Africa, Asia, Europe, Oceania and the Americas, although not all of these continents have member associations.

Americas (2):

1. Canada Carrom Canada CC http://www.carromcanada.com
2. United States US Carrom Association USCA http://www.uscarrom.org

Asia (8):

1. Bangladesh Bangladesh Carrom Federation BCF www.facebook.com/CarromFederation.bd
2. India All-India Carrom Federation AICF http://www.indiancarrom.co.in
3. Japan Japan Carrom Federation JCF http://www.carromjapan.com
4. South Korea Korea Carrom Federation KCF http://carrom.co.kr
5. Malaysia Malaysia
6. Maldives Carrom Association of Maldives CAM http://www.carrom.mv
7. Pakistan Pakistan Carrom Federation PCF http://www.pakcarrom.org
8. Sri Lanka Srilankan Carrom Federation http://www.carrom4u.com

Europe (7):

1. Czech Republic Czech Carrom Association CCA http://www.carrom.cz
2. Germany Deutscher Carrom Verband DCV http://www.carrom.de
3. France Carrom Federation Francais CFF http://www.carrom.net
4. Italy Federatione Italiana Carrom FIC http://www.carromitaly.com
5. Poland Polish Carrom Association PCA http://www.carrom.pl
6. Switzerland Swiss Carrom Association SCA http://www.carrom.ch
7. United Kingdom United Kingdom Carrom Federation UKCF http://www.ukcarromfed.com

=== National Federations ===
- All India Carrom Federation
- Carrom Association of Maldives
- Carrom Federation of Sri Lanka
- Pakistan Carrom Federation
- Japan Carrom Federation
- Korea Carrom Federation http://www.carrom.co.kr
- Bangladesh Carrom Federation
- Malaysian Carrom Association
- Swiss Carrom Association http://www.carrom.ch
- German Carrom Federation http://www.carrom.de
- Canadian Carrom Association
- United States Carrom Association
- United Kingdom Carrom Federation
- United Arab Emirates Carrom Federation
- Federazione Italiana Carrom http://www.carromitaly.com
- French Carrom Federation
- Belgian Carrom Federation
- Polish Carrom Association http://www.carrom.pl
- Czech Carrom Association http://www.carrom.cz

=== Other associated organisations ===
These organizations are not official affiliates of the ICF, but use ICF rules.

- Carrom Ass. of New Zealand
- Saudi Arabia Carrom Federation
- Bahrain Carrom Association
- Myanmar Carrom Representative
- Swedish Carrom Association
- UK Carrom Club
- Spanish Carrom Contact
- Qatar - QICA Qatar Indian Carrom Association

== See also ==
- 2016 Carrom World Championship
- 2018 Carrom World Cup
