= All India Carrom Federation =

All India Carrom Federation or Carrom Federation
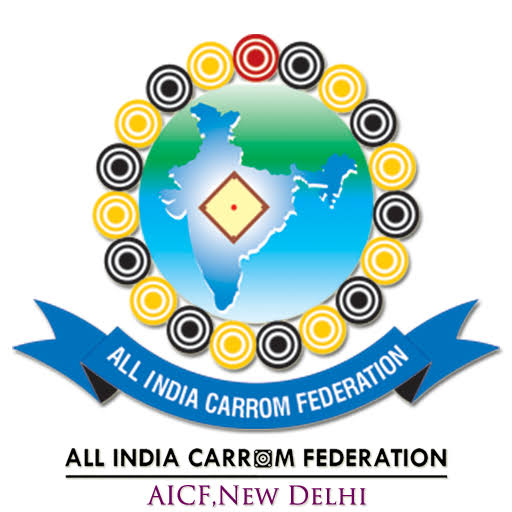
- Sport: Carrom
- Jurisdiction: India
- Abbreviation: AICF
- Founded: 19th century
- Affiliation: International Carrom Federation
- Regional affiliation: Asian Carrom Federation
- Headquarters: New Delhi, India
- President: Rakibul Hussain
- Vice president(s): PS Bacher, Gurinder Singh, Vijay Kumar
- Secretary: Mrs Bharti Narayan
- (India)

The All India Carrom Federation, aka AICF aka Carrom Federation, is India's national sport federation for the indigenous game of carrom, sanctioning six to seven national-level tournaments per year. It is India's representative body in the International Carrom Federation. The AICF has 15 regional and 28 state subnational affiliate institutions, the largest of which is the Maharashtra Carrom Association, further subdivided into local organisations.

As of 2007, the federation's president is Rakibul Hussain and its general secretary is Bharti Narayan. Recent national champions include R. M. Shankra, Ravinder Goud and A. Maria Irudayam.

== History ==
The state associations as its member. Shri C. Cunnaiah of Tamil Nadu was the General Secretary and Shri Hedvekar of Maharashtra was elected as its President. It got itself registered under the Societies Registration Act XXI of 1860 at Madras on 7 July 1977. The Federation was recognized by the Sports Council of India on 26 October 1970. It became the member of the International Carrom Federation on 15 October 1988 and played a pivotal role in the formation of the International Federation. In 1991, the Government of India included the game of carrom in its list for the purpose of recruitment under sports quota in Government offices/ organizations. The Asian Carrom Confederation became affiliated with the AICF in September 1995.

The All-India Carrom Federation was granted formal recognition by the Indian Olympic Association in October 1997, conferring upon it the status of a recognized national sports federation. The game of carrom was also recognized by the School Games Federation of India in 1996.

The organisation at present has 30 Indian state level bodies associations and 18 Institutions as its affiliates. The Working Committee of the Federation is elected for a term of four years. The last elections to the Federation were held in August 2003 at Goa. AICF regularly conducts national championships for sub-junior, junior, and senior (older adult) divisions. Inter Institutional National Carrom Championship is also conducted among various national institutions including Banks, Railways and Public Sector Units which are affiliated to the AICF, the All-India Federation Cup, and various other all-India ranking and prize-money tournaments every year. From 1956 to 31 st March 2012 the Federation has conducted 120 national championships (senior, junior and sub-junior levels), Zonal championships, Inter zonal championships, All India Federation Cup Ranking Tournament, Inter Institution National Championship and several Prize Money and invited tournaments thereby providing due recognition to carom players at national level.

The Federation has also made bilateral arrangements with various countries for organizing "Test Series" in which national teams compete in a series of matches alternately hosted by each country. India and Sri Lanka hold Test Series on a regular basis; similar arrangements exist with Germany and the United Kingdom. competitions. India and Sri Lanka are playing Test Series on a regular basis. The Federation organised 10 major international tournaments in India.

=== List of National Sports award recipients in Carrom, showing the year, award, and gender ===
Year	Recipient	Award	Gender
1996	A. Maria Irudayam	Arjuna Award	Male

== Officials ==
- President: Rakibul Hussain, Member of Parliament, Dhubri Lok Sabha constituency
- Sr Vice President: Neeraj Kumar Sampathy (Andhra)
- Vice Presidents: PS Bacher (Maharashtra), Gurinder Singh (Punjab), Vijay Kumar (Chhattisgarh)
- General Secretary: Bharti Narayan (Delhi)
- Treasurer: Madan Raj (Telangana State Carrom Association)
- Joint Secretaries: North Zone – Adil Rashid Shah(Jammu & Kashmir); South Zone – Md Asadullah Ansari (Karnataka); West Zone – Vrajesh Jindal (Gujarat); North East – Fardi Nand Nongkynrih(Meghalaya), East Zone – Dibendu Simlai (Weat Bengal)

== All India Panel umpires ==
1. S. K. Abdul Jaleel, Andhra
2. S.K. Ajmatullah, Andhra
3. K. Ramesh, Andhra
4. T. Srinivasa Rao, Andhra
5. D.S.R. Murthy, Andhra
6. S.Madhusudanarao, Andhra
7. Rana Sharma, Assam
8. Prasanta Neog, Assam
9. Pinto Mukherjee, Bengal
10. Debabrata Ghoshal, Bengal
11. Hussain Irshad, Bihar
12. Rajneesh Sinha, Bihar
13. Sanmir Verenkar, Goa
14. Dinanath, Goa
15. Ms. Nirmala Mahant, Gujarat
16. Ms Kamna Yadav, Haryana
17. J.S. Saroha, Haryana
18. Shashwat, Haryana
19. Zaheeruddin Khan, Hyderabad
20. Srinivasa Rao, Hyderabad
21. S. Shobhanraj, Hyderabad
22. Karoda Singh, Hyderabad
23. Kumar Ajay, Jharkhand
24. H. Shivaji Rao, Karnataka
25. G. Jayakumar, Karnataka
26. B. Rama, Karnataka
27. B.C. Krishna Swamy, Karnataka
28. Dutta Salagare, Maharashtra
29. Shekhar S Chavan, Maharashtra
30. Ramesh S Chavan, Maharashtra
31. Ketan Chikale, Maharashtra
32. Suhas Karbhari, Maharashtra
33. Ashish Bagkar, Maharashtra
34. S K Abdula, Orissa
35. Probodh Patnaik, Orissa
36. R. Srinivasan, Tamil Nadu
37. G. Jayakumar, Tamil Nadu
38. A.K. Asthana, U.P
39. Ajay Kumar Sharma, U.P
40. Mukund Nagpurkar, Maharashtra
41. Ramteke, Maharashtra
42. C. Senthamizh Kumaran, Puducherry
43. I. Ilansezhiyan, Puducherry
44. Arjun Kumar Yadav, Chandigarh

== State/regional associations ==
=== North ===
- Punjab State Carrom Association
- Haryana Carrom Association
- Delhi Carrom Association
- Jammu & Kashmir Carrom Association
- Chandigarh Carrom Association
- Himachal Pradesh Carrom Association
- Uttarakhand Carrom Association

=== South ===
- Tamil Nadu Carrom Association
- Hyderabad Carrom Association
- Andhra Pradesh Carrom Association
- Karnataka Carrom Association
- Kerala Carrom Association
- Puducherry Carrom Association

=== West ===
- Rajasthan Carrom Association
- Maharashtra Carrom Association
- Vidharba Carrom Association
- Gujarat Carrom Association
- Goa Carrom Association

=== East & North East ===
- Carrom Association of Assam
- Odisha State Carrom Association
- Sikkim Carrom Association
- West Bengal Carrom Association
- Manipur Carrom Association
- Tripura Carrom Association
- Mizoram Carrom Association
- Meghalaya Carrom Association
- Arunanchal Carrom Association

=== Center ===
- Uttar Pradesh Carrom Association
- Bihar Carrom Association
- Chhattisgarh Carrom Association
- Jharkhand Carrom Association
- Madhya Pradesh Carrom Association

== Institutional members ==
- Banks Sports Board
- Life Insurance Corporation of India Sports Board
- Reserve Bank of India sports board
- Petroleum Sports Promotion Board
- All India Electricity Sports Board
- BSNL Sports board & Cultural Board
- Central Civil Services Cultural & Sports Control Board
- Defense Accounts Sports Control Board
- Indian Accounts & Audit Dept. Sports Board
- Indian Medical Association Sports Board
- ISRO sports & Recreation Club
- Major Ports Sports Control Board
- Postal Sports Control Board
- United India Sports & Cultural Council
