= Nishantha Fernando (carrom player) =

Sri Lankan carrom player

Wannakuwatte Waduge Dinesh Nishantha Fernando is a Sri Lankan carrom player and a former world number one carrom player. Fernanado was a National Carrom champion in Sri Lanka, who became a Carrom World champion in Men's singles event in 2012 by defeating C. Bharathi Dhasan of India 25–4, 25–10 in the finals. Fernando also became the first Sri Lankan to win Carrom World Championship title and a player to win the title from country except India and the second Sri Lankan to win an individual World Championship title, following Mohammad Lafir, who won the Snooker World Championship title in 1973. Fernando was also the key member of the Sri Lankan carrom team which won the 2016 Carrom World Championship in England, the largest Carrom World Championship, with fifteen countries participating.

== See also ==
List of Sri Lankans by sport
