= Rashmi Kumari =

Indian international carrom player

Personal information
- Nationality: Indian

Sport
- Country: India
- Sport: carrom
Medal record
Representing India
Women's carrom
Carrom World Championship
Gold medal – first place	2000 Delhi, India	singles
Gold medal – first place	2012 Colombo, Srilanka	singles
Gold medal – first place	2022 Langkawi, Malaysia	singles
Carrom World Cup
Gold medal – first place	2001 Luton, UK	singles
Gold medal – first place	2014 Sun Island, Maldives	singles
Silver medal – second place	2024 California, USA	singles
ICF CUP
Gold medal – first place	2008 Colombo, Srilanka	singles
Gold medal – first place	2012 Kuala Lumpur, Malaysia	singles
Bronze medal – third place	2015 Delhi, India	singles
Bronze medal – third place	2019 Pune, India	singles
Asian Carrom Championship
Bronze medal – third place	2005 Male, Maldives	singles
Gold medal – first place	2007 Pune, India	singles
Gold medal – first place	2009 Raipur, India	singles
Silver medal – second place	2011 Male', Maldives	singles
Gold medal – first place	2013 Kolkata, India	singles
Gold medal – first place	2024 Male', Maldives	singles
SAARC Carrom Championship
Gold medal – first place	2006 Rathnapura, Sri Lanka	singles
Silver medal – second place	2007 Raipur, India	singles
Silver medal – second place	2008 Colombo, Sri Lanka	singles
Silver medal – second place	2009 Mumbai, India	singles
Gold medal – first place	2011 Male', Maldives	singles
Silver medal – second place	2013 Kolkata, India	singles

Rashmi Kumari is an international carrom player from Bihar, India, playing since 1992. She is the current world champion and has two more world titles under her name. She has won record-breaking world titles (3) and a record number of national titles (12).She has won numerous titiles in the last 20 years, including countless state ranking tournaments and other open national level tournaments. Rashmi Kumari is the most decorated carrom player in the world in both the men's and women's categories. She is regarded as the Queen of carrom for her consistent performances and unreachable achievements. She is employed at ONGC as Chief Manager (HR).

== Achievements ==
=== National ===
Women's singles

Details	Year	Achievements
Sub Junior National Champion	1997	Champion
Junior National Championship	2000	Champion
Senior National Championship	2004, 2005, 2007, 2010, 2011, 2012, 2013, 2014, 2015, 2017, 2019 and 2022	Champion
Sub Junior National Championship	1993, 1994 and 1995	Runner-up
Junior National Championship	1995 and 1998	Runner-up
Senior National Championship	2000 and 2002	Runner-up

=== International ===
Women's singles

==== Carrom World championship ====
Details	Year	Achievements	Venue
3rd Carrom World Championship	2000	Champion	Delhi, India
6th Carrom World Championship	2012	Champion	Colombo, Sri Lanka
8th Carrom World Championship	2022	Champion	Langkawi, Malaysia

==== Carrom World Cup ====
Details	Year	Achievements	Venue
1st Carrom World Cup	2001	Champion	Luton, UK
4th Carrom World Cup	2014	Champion	Sun Island Resort and Spa, Maldives
6th Carrom World Cup	2024	Runner-up	California, USA

==== International Carrom Federation (ICF) Cup ====
Details	Year	Achievements	Venue
5th ICF Cup	2008	Champion	Colombo, Sri Lanka
6th ICF Cup	2012	Champion	Kuala Lumpur, Malaysia
7th ICF Cup	2015	2nd Runner-up	Delhi, India
8th ICF Cup	2019	2nd Runner-up	Pune, India

==== Asian Carrom Championship ====
Details	Year	Achievements	Venue
1st Asian Carrom Championship	2005	2nd Runner-up	Male', Maldives
2nd Asian Carrom Championship	2007	Champion	Pune, India
3rd Asian Carrom Championship	2009	Champion	Raipur, India
4th Asian Carrom Championship	2011	Runner-up	Male', Maldives
5th Asian Carrom Championship	2013	Champion	Kolkata, India
6th Asian Carrom Championship	2024	Champion	Male', Maldives

==== SAARC Carrom Championship ====
Details	Year	Achievements	Venue				
10th SAARC Carrom Championship	2006	Champion	Ratnapura, Sri Lanka				
11th SAARC Carrom Championship	2007	Runner-up	Raipur, India				
12th SAARC Carrom Championship	2008	Runner-up	Colombo, Srilanka	14th SAARC Carrom Championship	2009	Runner-up	Mumbai, India
15th SAARC Carrom Championship	2011	Champion	Male', Maldives				
17th SAARC Carrom Championship	2013	Champion	Kolkata, India				

==== Open Championship ====
Details	Year	Achievements	Venue
1st Malaysian Open Carrom Championship	1999	Champion	Kuala Lumpur, Malaysia

=== Awards and honours ===
- Ambedkar Sports and Cultural Award in the Years 1995, 1996 and 1997.
- Swami Vivekanand Youth Award in the Year 1999.
- B. P. Sinha Foundation Sukhdev Narayan Award in the Years 1998 and 2000.
- Honour and Award by the State Youth and Cultural Department of Bihar in the years 1996, 2001, 2003, 2004, 2005, 2006, 2007, 2008, 2009, 2010 – conferred by Chief Minister of Bihar on National Sports Day every year.
- Best Sportsperson Award by Banks’ Sports Board in the Year 2004.
- Vishisth Khiladi (Outstanding Sportsperson) Award by the State Government in the Year 2009
